= List of members of the European Parliament for Ireland, 2024–2029 =

This is a list of the 14 members of the European Parliament for Ireland elected at the 2024 European Parliament election. They serve in the 2024 to 2029 session.

== List ==
Name	Constituency	National party	EP group
Barry Andrews	Dublin	Fianna Fáil	RE
Regina Doherty	Dublin	Fine Gael	EPP
Lynn Boylan	Dublin	Sinn Féin	The Left
Aodhán Ó Ríordáin	Dublin	Labour	S&D
Luke 'Ming' Flanagan	Midlands–North-West	Independent	The Left
Barry Cowen	Midlands–North-West	Fianna Fáil	RE
Nina Carberry	Midlands–North-West	Fine Gael	EPP
Maria Walsh	Midlands–North-West	Fine Gael	EPP
Ciaran Mullooly	Midlands–North-West	Independent Ireland	RE
Seán Kelly	South	Fine Gael	EPP
Billy Kelleher	South	Fianna Fáil	RE
Michael McNamara	South	Independent	RE
Cynthia Ní Mhurchú	South	Fianna Fáil	RE
Kathleen Funchion	South	Sinn Féin	The Left

== See also ==
- Members of the European Parliament (2024–2029) – List by country
- List of members of the European Parliament (2024–2029) – Full alphabetical list
