= Rory Hearne =

Irish politician and academic

Rory Hearne TD
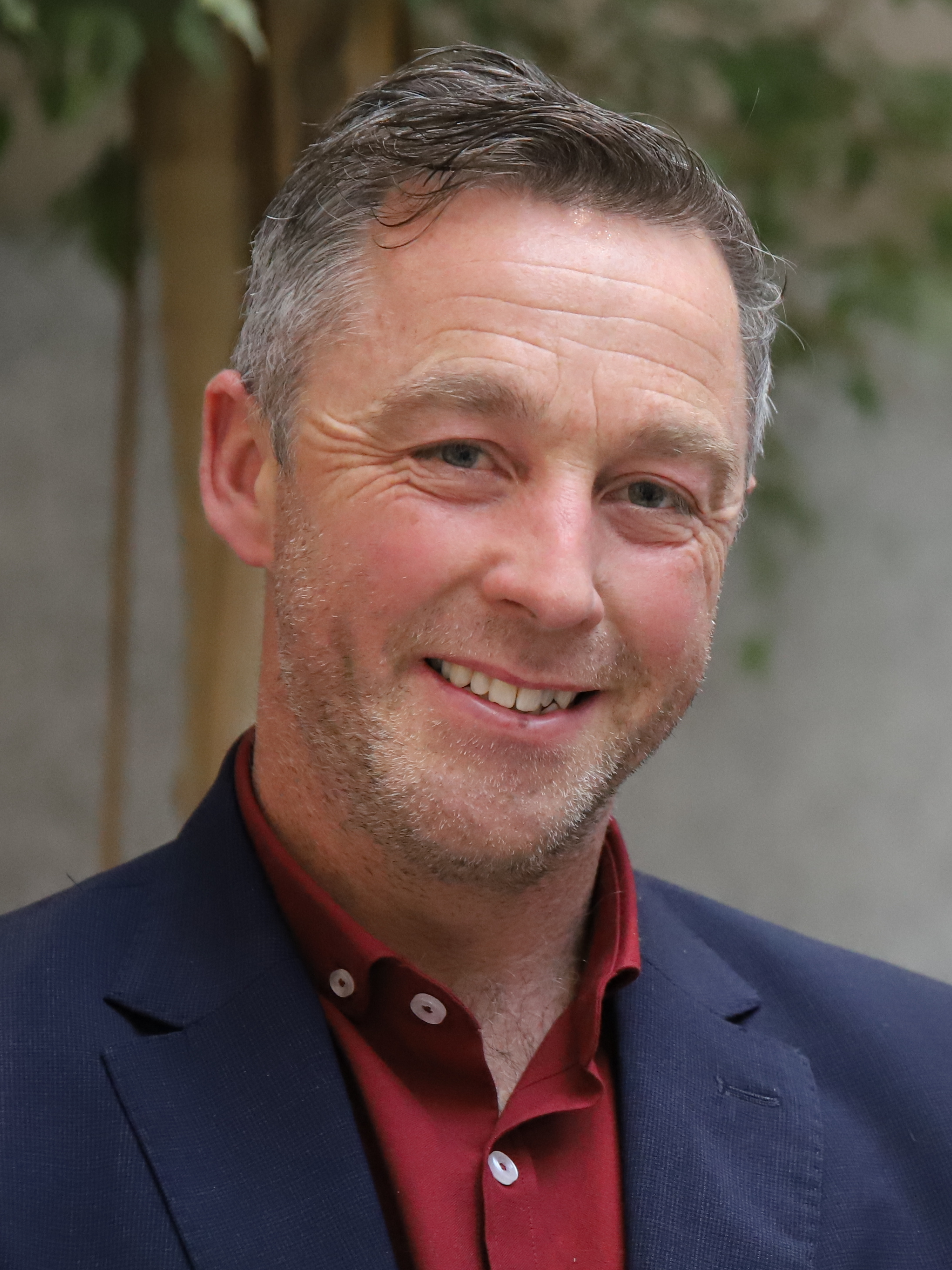
- Hearne in 2026

Teachta Dála
- Incumbent
- Assumed office November 2024
- Constituency: Dublin North-West

Personal details
- Born: 1978/1979 (age 46–47)
- Party: Social Democrats
- Other political affiliations: Labour Party (2011); People Before Profit (c. 2005)
- Children: 4
- Education: Trinity College Dublin

Rory Hearne (born 1978/1979) is an Irish Social Democrats politician who has been a Teachta Dála (TD) for the Dublin North-West constituency since the 2024 general election. He was previously an academic known for his work on the Irish housing crisis.

== Education and career ==
He attended Trinity College Dublin where he earned a first class honours degree in Geography in 2000 and subsequently a Ph.D. in 2009. While at Trinity he was elected president of Trinity College Dublin Students' Union. He also served as the vice-president of the Union of Students in Ireland. As of 2024 he worked as associate professor in social policy at Maynooth University.

He has commentated on social and economic issues in media outlets such as the Tonight with Vincent Browne television programme and in op-eds for the Irish Examiner, The Irish Times and The Guardian newspapers.

Hearne has publicly criticised the Fine Gael and Fianna Fáil parties who led every government during his career. Hearne has been cited as an authority on the housing crisis by The New York Times. His book on the housing crisis, Gaffs was released in 2022 and became a bestseller.

== Political campaigns ==
Hearne was a founding member of the People Before Profit Alliance in 2005, and ran unsuccessfully as their candidate in the Dublin South-East constituency in 2007. He spent three months as a member of the Labour Party before resigning in 2011 in protest at their decision to form a governing coalition with Fine Gael as the Government of the 31st Dáil. He ran unsuccessfully for the Seanad as an independent for the National University of Ireland constituency in 2016 (finishing 11th), and again in 2020 (finishing 7th).

Hearne joined the Social Democrats in 2024, and was their candidate at the 2024 European Parliament election for the Midlands–North-West constituency, where he secured 15,023 (2.2%) first preference votes and was eliminated after the 12th count. Hearne received media attention during the campaign for his criticism of Ciaran Mullooly of Independent Ireland (who went on to win a seat) for what Hearne saw as Mullooly's scapegoating of migrants rather than focusing on the causes of the housing crisis. At the 2024 general election, Hearne was elected for the Dublin North-West constituency, where retiring party leader party leader Róisín Shortall had held a seat since 1992.

Elections to the Dáil
Party	Election		FPv	FPv%	Result
People Before Profit	Dublin South-East	2007	591	1.8	Eliminated on count 1/5
Social Democrats	Dublin North-West	2024	4,631	14.1	Elected on count 9/9

== Political views ==
Hearne has cited Peter McVerry, Mary Robinson, Christy Moore, Dublin housing activists Rita Fagan and John Bissett, Róisín Shortall, Catherine Connolly, Greta Thunberg, Bernie Sanders, and Noel Browne as influencing his political views.

Hearne is a critic of Fine Gael and Fianna Fáil's housing policies, which he describes as a form of "social vandalism". Hearne advocates for housing policy that prioritises the needs of vulnerable groups, including young people, renters, and those facing homelessness. He has been particularly critical of investor funds and property developers, whom he believes have exacerbated the housing shortage. Hearne advocates for a state-led approach to housing development, proposing the establishment of a state developer to build homes rather than relying on the Land Development Agency, which he criticises as being "NAMA 2.0".

In addition to housing, Hearne is concerned with broader social issues, such as climate change, workers' rights, and the rise of the far right. He opposes anti-immigrant rhetoric and believes the Irish government, alongside other political parties, has failed to adequately address these concerns.

On European issues, Hearne supports the European Union's stance against the Russian invasion of Ukraine and has condemned Putin's Russia as "Imperialist". Hearne is a supporter of Palestinian rights and has condemned Israel's actions in Gaza, as well as the perceived inaction of the US government under Joe Biden.

== Personal life ==
Hearne is married with four children, and has lived in North Dublin for over 20 years. Hearne disclosed on an episode of podcast The Two Norries published in November 2022 that he had been the victim of sexual abuse as a teenager by a perpetrator in his community who was later convicted and imprisoned.

== Bibliography ==
- Gaffs: Why no one can get a house, and what we can do about it (2022)

Dáil	Election	Deputy (Party)	Deputy (Party)	Deputy (Party)	Deputy (Party)
2nd	1921	Philip Cosgrave (SF)	Joseph McGrath (SF)	Richard Mulcahy (SF)	Michael Staines (SF)
3rd	1922	Philip Cosgrave (PT-SF)	Joseph McGrath (PT-SF)	Richard Mulcahy (PT-SF)	Michael Staines (PT-SF)
4th	1923	Constituency abolished. See Dublin North			

Dáil	Election	Deputy (Party)	Deputy (Party)	Deputy (Party)	Deputy (Party)	Deputy (Party)
9th	1937	Seán T. O'Kelly (FF)	A. P. Byrne (Ind.)	Cormac Breathnach (FF)	Patrick McGilligan (FG)	Archie Heron (Lab)
10th	1938	Seán T. O'Kelly (FF)	A. P. Byrne (Ind.)	Cormac Breathnach (FF)	Patrick McGilligan (FG)	Eamonn Cooney (FF)
11th	1943	Seán T. O'Kelly (FF)	A. P. Byrne (Ind.)	Cormac Breathnach (FF)	Patrick McGilligan (FG)	Martin O'Sullivan (Lab)
12th	1944	Seán T. O'Kelly (FF)	John S. O'Connor (FF)	Cormac Breathnach (FF)	Patrick McGilligan (FG)	Martin O'Sullivan (Lab)
12th	1945 by-election	Vivion de Valera (FF)	John S. O'Connor (FF)	Cormac Breathnach (FF)	Patrick McGilligan (FG)	Martin O'Sullivan (Lab)
13th	1948	Mick Fitzpatrick (CnaP)	A. P. Byrne (Ind.)	Cormac Breathnach (FF)	3 seats from 1948 to 1969	
14th	1951	Declan Costello (FG)	A. P. Byrne (Ind.)	Cormac Breathnach (FF)	3 seats from 1948 to 1969	
14th	1952 by-election	Declan Costello (FG)	Thomas Byrne (Ind.)	Cormac Breathnach (FF)	3 seats from 1948 to 1969	
15th	1954	Declan Costello (FG)	Thomas Byrne (Ind.)	Richard Gogan (FF)	3 seats from 1948 to 1969	
16th	1957	Declan Costello (FG)	Thomas Byrne (Ind.)	Richard Gogan (FF)	3 seats from 1948 to 1969	
17th	1961	Declan Costello (FG)	Michael Mullen (Lab)	Richard Gogan (FF)	3 seats from 1948 to 1969	
18th	1965	Declan Costello (FG)	Michael Mullen (Lab)	Richard Gogan (FF)	3 seats from 1948 to 1969	
19th	1969	Hugh Byrne (FG)	Jim Tunney (FF)	Richard Gogan (FF)	David Thornley (Lab)	4 seats from 1969 to 1977
20th	1973	Hugh Byrne (FG)	Jim Tunney (FF)	Richard Gogan (FF)	David Thornley (Lab)	4 seats from 1969 to 1977
21st	1977	Constituency abolished. See Dublin Finglas and Dublin Cabra				

Dáil	Election	Deputy (Party)	Deputy (Party)	Deputy (Party)	Deputy (Party)
22nd	1981	Jim Tunney (FF)	Michael Barrett (FF)	Mary Flaherty (FG)	Hugh Byrne (FG)
23rd	1982 (Feb)	Jim Tunney (FF)	Michael Barrett (FF)	Mary Flaherty (FG)	Proinsias De Rossa (WP)
24th	1982 (Nov)	Jim Tunney (FF)	Michael Barrett (FF)	Mary Flaherty (FG)	Proinsias De Rossa (WP)
25th	1987	Jim Tunney (FF)	Michael Barrett (FF)	Mary Flaherty (FG)	Proinsias De Rossa (WP)
26th	1989	Jim Tunney (FF)	Michael Barrett (FF)	Mary Flaherty (FG)	Proinsias De Rossa (WP)
27th	1992	Noel Ahern (FF)	Róisín Shortall (Lab)	Mary Flaherty (FG)	Proinsias De Rossa (DL)
28th	1997	Noel Ahern (FF)	Róisín Shortall (Lab)	Pat Carey (FF)	Proinsias De Rossa (DL)
29th	2002	Noel Ahern (FF)	Róisín Shortall (Lab)	Pat Carey (FF)	3 seats from 2002
30th	2007	Noel Ahern (FF)	Róisín Shortall (Lab)	Pat Carey (FF)	3 seats from 2002
31st	2011	Dessie Ellis (SF)	Róisín Shortall (Lab)	John Lyons (Lab)	3 seats from 2002
32nd	2016	Dessie Ellis (SF)	Róisín Shortall (SD)	Noel Rock (FG)	3 seats from 2002
33rd	2020	Dessie Ellis (SF)	Róisín Shortall (SD)	Paul McAuliffe (FF)	3 seats from 2002
34th	2024	Dessie Ellis (SF)	Rory Hearne (SD)	Paul McAuliffe (FF)	3 seats from 2002
