= Ciaran Mullooly =

Irish politician (born 1966)

Ciaran Mullooly MEP
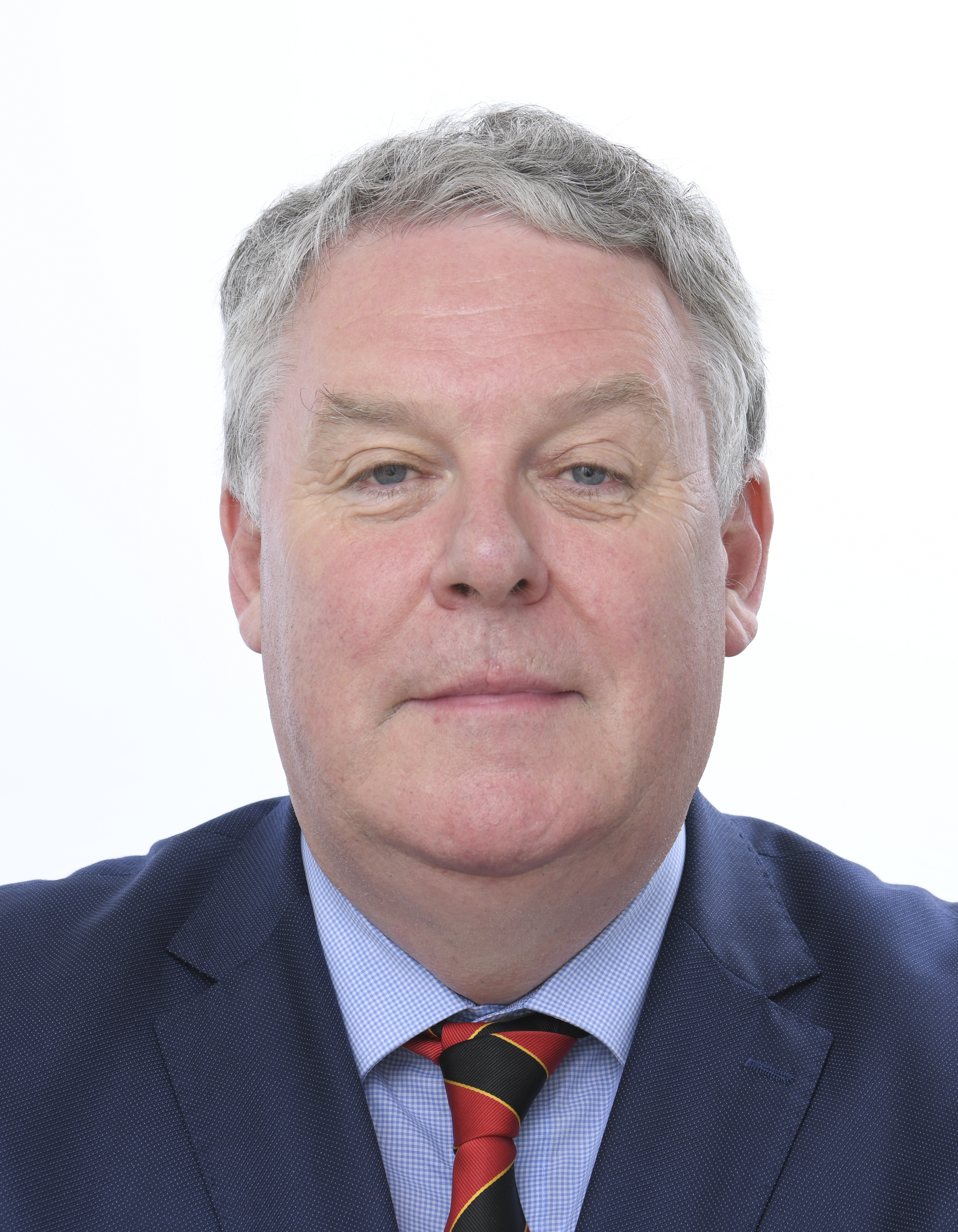
- Mullooly in 2024

Member of the European Parliament
- Incumbent
- Assumed office 17 July 2024
- Constituency: Midlands–North-West

Personal details
- Born: 4 September 1966 (age 60) County Longford, Ireland
- Party: Ireland: Independent Ireland; EU: Renew Europe
- Other political affiliations: European Democratic Party
- Children: 2
- Website: ciaranmullooly.com

Ciaran Mullooly (born 4 September 1966) is an Irish Independent Ireland politician who has served as a Member of the European Parliament (MEP) for the Midlands–North-West constituency since July 2024. A former journalist, he worked for RTÉ from 1993 to 2021, where he was the RTÉ News Midlands correspondent for 26 years.

== Personal life ==
Mullooly lives in Ballyleague, County Roscommon with his wife and two children. He was born in County Longford.

== Media career ==
Mullooly started his career with the Longford Leader in 1985, before moving to the Cavan Leader newspaper aged 20. He joined RTÉ in 1993, where he worked on Ear to the Ground, and was the RTÉ News Midlands correspondent from 1995 until 2021.

After retiring from RTÉ in June 2021, he worked as a tourism activator for Longford County Council. Mullooly is a published author and has written three books.

Mullooly had been courted by Ireland's establishment parties "for decades" to run for office, however, he always refused to run.

== Political career ==
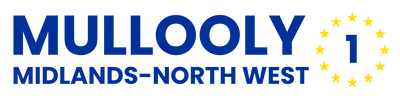
Mullooly's logo during the 2024 European Parliament elections

In April 2024, Mullooly announced his intention to run for Independent Ireland at the 2024 European Parliament election for the Midlands–North-West constituency. In his announcement Mullooly stated that "Common sense must prevail. The political system has failed this community" (the Midlands) specifically citing the environmentalist group, Friends of the Irish Environment, successfully blocking a flood relief pipeline and the damage this has caused the Midlands, as a fundamental draconian failure of European policy and guidelines. Mullooly stated that "I would have said that I was a centrist" and took soft positions on energy, SMEs, and migration.

Mullooly was heavily criticised by his Social Democrats opponent, Rory Hearne, as a "hypocrite" for supporting community values while also running for a party that opposes immigration. Hearne also claimed Mullooly had "no solutions" and further criticised Mullooly for not opposing landlords. Mullooly "utterly reject[ed]" Hearne's claims, stating that "I support the right of those fleeing conflict and oppression to seek asylum here but feel our present system is not fit for purpose". Mullooly ran a grassroots campaign, with a staff of just 20, answering phone calls himself and running his staff like an RTÉ newsroom. Mullooly centered his criticism on the Green Party stating that "We all agree with the transition" (to renewable energy) but "that the transition hasn't worked out". Mullooly also focused on agricultural issues, such as supporting the use of nitrogen fertilisers. Mullooly was not included in RTÉ's European election TV debate, after which he heavily criticised RTÉ, claiming it willfully ignored opinion polls that qualified him and that his exclusion was politically based.

Mullooly was elected as an MEP, taking the fifth seat in Midlands–North-West. Mullooly performed particularly well in County Offaly.

He took office on 17 July 2024, joining the European Democratic Party and sitting with the Renew Europe parliamentary group. Mullooly's decision to join Renew attracted significant criticism, with fellow candidate Niall Boylan stating he would have joined the European Conservatives and Reformists if elected. Independent Ireland chair Elaine Mullally, who resigned her position shortly after Mullooly joined Renew, later said that it had been the "catalyst" for her to leave.

In July 2025, Mullooly provided the lone vote from the Renew group in favour of the censure motion against the von der Leyen Commission II over Pfizergate.
