= Niall Boylan =

Irish radio presenter (born 1963)

- Born: 21 September 1963 (age 62); Dublin, Ireland
- Education: Ardscoil La Salle
- Occupation: Radio broadcaster
- Years active: 1996–present
- Political party: Independent Ireland (April–July 2024)
- Spouse: Karen Boylan (m. 2022)
- Children: 3
- Website: niallboylan.com

Niall Boylan (born 21 September 1963) is an Irish radio presenter, podcaster, and political candidate. He was the presenter of The Niall Boylan Show on Classic Hits 4FM, broadcasting Monday to Friday from 12 to 2 pm and again from 9 pm to 1 am. He also hosts The Niall Boylan Podcast. He previously worked for 98FM and FM104. He has been described as a "shock jock" radio host.

Boylan was an Independent Ireland party candidate for the Dublin constituency in the 2024 European Parliament elections, but was eliminated on the final count.

== Early life ==
Boylan was born at St Patrick's Mother and Baby Home, and adopted after 16 months by Frank and Elizabeth Boylan. As a child, he was diagnosed with alopecia, receiving hair restoration treatment for it. He was raised in Raheny, and prior to entering radio worked as a shoe salesman.

== Media career ==
Boylan has previously worked for 98FM, where he was the street reporter for the Chris Barry Show, and FM104. In 2000, while on a live broadcast for the Chris Barry Show, Boylan was attacked in an attempted car robbery; his attacker received 12 months in prison for this.

In 2009, he launched the radio station Real Radio, broadcast in Dublin. Boylan was the presenter of The Niall Boylan Show on Classic Hits 4FM. His show has won nine awards, including one for Best Scheduled Talk Show at the 2017 New York Festivals International Radio Program Awards, as well as several IMRO Radio Awards. Boylan has been described as a "shock jock" radio host.

In September 2015, Boylan faced calls for a boycott following his interview with Molly Martens, who was convicted of manslaughter in 2015. Sarah Lynch-Corbett, the daughter of Limerick businessman Jason Corbett, said on X (formerly Twitter): "Niall Boylan provided a platform to #MollyMartens after she killed my father, subsequently causing ongoing harm to my life. I am the daughter of #JasonCorbett, who was abused by Molly Martens."

Boylan departed his position as presenter of The Niall Boylan Show in 2024, due to his candidacy for the European Parliament legally disallowing him from broadcasting on commercial radio.

== Political career ==
In April 2024, Boylan announced that he would stand for the Independent Ireland party in the Dublin constituency in the 2024 European Parliament elections. That same month Boylan argued that criticism levelled at his party leader, Michael Collins TD, was unfair as Collins had apologised several times for the fact that in 2001 he had written a supportive character statement for a man who was subsequently convicted of underage sex. Boylan argued that people were making "too much" of Collins' actions and that "I think the man [Collins] said he regrets it, we all make mistakes in our lives, do things that we regret."

Following Boylan's declaration of his candidacy, he received criticism for interviewing a man who had engaged in sexual intercourse with dogs. Boylan said that he had "challenged" the man on air and hit out at what he called a "poorly executed smear campaign".

Boylan was not elected: he was the final candidate eliminated, on the 19th count, coming fifth in the four-seat constituency. In July 2024, Boylan confirmed on his X account that he had left Independent Ireland three months after joining the party.

=== Political views ===
In a 2018 interview, Boylan suggested that left-wing politicians in Ireland encourage voters to live on welfare and feel entitled to "free homes", and that left-wing politicians unfairly criticise multinational companies based in Ireland such as Apple. In the same interview, Boylan stated that he believes that prostitution should be legalised.

== Personal life ==
Boylan lives in Swords. In 2022, Boylan married his second wife, Karen. He has three adult children from a previous marriage. In 2024, Boylan revealed that he had been homeless for two years, and had slept in his car for many nights following a divorce.

He has publicly discussed his struggles with depression, and in a 2018 interview revealed that he had contemplated suicide.
