= Midlands–North-West =

Constituency of the European Parliament in Ireland

- European Parliament constituency
- Location among the current constituencies

- Midlands–North-West shown within Ireland (2014–2019, 2024– boundaries)
- Member state: Ireland
- Electorate: 1,224,888
- Created: 2014
- MEPs: 4 (2014–2024); 5 (2024–)

Midlands–North-West is a European Parliament constituency in Ireland. It elects five Members of the European Parliament (MEPs) on the electoral system of proportional representation by means of the single transferable vote.

== History and boundaries ==
Midlands–North-West was created for the 2014 European Parliament election when Ireland's allocation of seats was reduced from 12 to 11 due to the accession of Croatia to the European Union. It followed a recommendation of a 2013 Constituency Commission report on European Parliament constituencies in Ireland. It consisted of the old North-West constituency, except for County Clare which was moved to the South constituency; as well the northern and central Leinster part of the East constituency. The Irish Times criticised the wide geographic spread of the constituency, calling it "a heterogeneous mish-mash of counties with little historic or cultural connection to each other". It was nicknamed "Malin M50" for its wide spread, from the suburbs of Dublin to the Atlantic seaboard.

For the 2019 European Parliament election, a reapportionment following Brexit and the loss of 73 MEPs from the United Kingdom gave two additional seats to Ireland. Following a recommendation of the Constituency Commission, counties Laois and Offaly were moved to the South constituency, with Midlands–North-West maintaining its 4 seats.

At the 2024 European Parliament election, Midlands–North-West increased to 5 seats, with the transfer of County Laois and County Offaly from South. This followed a recommendation of the Electoral Commission, where Ireland had been allocated one additional MEP. This gives the new constituency a population of 1,831,741, as of the 2022 census

The constituency comprises the counties of Cavan, Donegal, Galway, Kildare, Laois, Leitrim, Longford, Louth, Mayo, Meath, Monaghan, Offaly, Roscommon, Sligo and Westmeath; and the city of Galway.

The main urban areas of Midlands–North-West (by population size) are Galway, Drogheda, Dundalk, Navan, Newbridge, Naas, Portlaoise, Athlone, Mullingar, Letterkenny, Celbridge, Sligo, Maynooth, Leixlip, Ashbourne and Tullamore.

| Election | Area | Seats |
|---|---|---|
| 2014 | Counties of Cavan, Donegal, Galway, Kildare, Laois, Leitrim, Longford, Louth, Mayo, Meath, Monaghan, Offaly, Roscommon, Sligo and Westmeath; and the city of Galway. | 4 |
| 2019 | Loss of Laois and Offaly to South | 4 |
| 2024 | Transfer of Laois and Offaly from South | 5 |

== MEPs ==
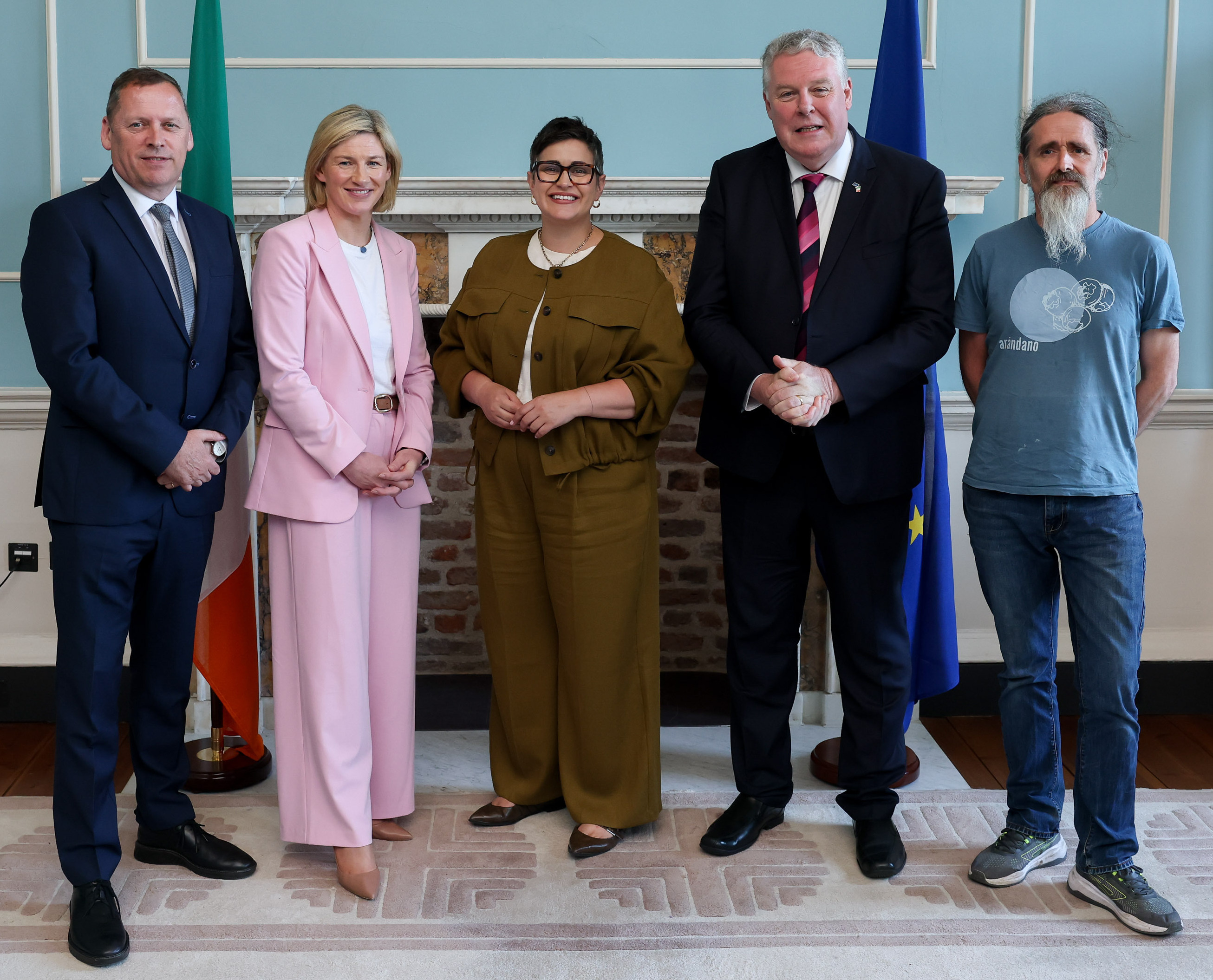
The 2024–29 Midlands–North-West MEPs in 2026: (L–R) Cowen, Carberry, Walsh, Mullooly, Flanagan.

Members of the European Parliament (MEPs) for Midlands–North-West 2014–
Key to parties: FF = Fianna Fáil; FG = Fine Gael; II = Independent Ireland; SF = Sinn Féin; Ind. = Independent
| Parl. | Election | Member (Party) | Member (Party) | Member (Party) | Member (Party) | Member (Party) |
| 8th | 2014 | Matt Carthy (SF) | Luke 'Ming' Flanagan (Ind.) | Marian Harkin (Ind.) | Mairead McGuinness (FG) | 4 seats 2014–2024 |
| 9th | 2019 | Matt Carthy (SF) | Luke 'Ming' Flanagan (Ind.) | Maria Walsh (FG) | Mairead McGuinness (FG) | 4 seats 2014–2024 |
| 9th | 2020 (Note: Carthy was elected to the 33rd Dáil and was substituted by Chris MacManus (SF/GUE/NGL) in February 2020.) | Chris MacManus (SF) | Luke 'Ming' Flanagan (Ind.) | Maria Walsh (FG) | Mairead McGuinness (FG) | 4 seats 2014–2024 |
| 9th | 2020 (Note: McGuinness was appointed as European Commissioner and was substituted by Colm Markey (FG / EPP) in September 2020.) | Chris MacManus (SF) | Luke 'Ming' Flanagan (Ind.) | Maria Walsh (FG) | Colm Markey (FG) | 4 seats 2014–2024 |
| 10th | 2024 | Barry Cowen (FF) | Luke 'Ming' Flanagan (Ind.) | Maria Walsh (FG) | Nina Carberry (FG) | Ciaran Mullooly (II) |

Note: The columns in this table are used only for presentational purposes, and no significance should be attached to the order of columns. For details of the order in which seats were won at each election, see the detailed results of that election.

== Elections ==
*: Outgoing MEP elected at the previous election.
†: Outgoing MEP co-opted subsequent to the previous election.

=== 2024 election ===
2024 European Parliament election: Midlands–North-West (5 seats)
| Party | Candidate | FPv% | Count | | | | | | | | | | | | | | | | | | | | |
| Party | Candidate | FPv% | 1 | 2 | 3 | 4 | 5 | 6 | 7 | 8 | 9 | 10 | 11 | 12 | 13 | 14 | 15 | 16 | 17 | 18 | 19 | 20 | 21 |
|---|---|---|---|---|---|---|---|---|---|---|---|---|---|---|---|---|---|---|---|---|---|---|---|
| Independent | Luke 'Ming' Flanagan | 11.50 | 78,214 | 78,551 | 78,700 | 78,855 | 79,019 | 79,582 | 79,842 | 80,484 | 81,122 | 81,663 | 82,856 | 84,665 | 88,033 | 89,660 | 95,314 | 103,653 | 106,461 | 110,533 | 118,754 | | |
| Fianna Fáil | Barry Cowen | 10.87 | 73,908 | 73,995 | 74,041 | 74,110 | 74,204 | 74,237 | 74,326 | 74,488 | 74,603 | 74,830 | 75,328 | 75,594 | 76,326 | 76,545 | 78,208 | 78,841 | 84,965 | 85,592 | 89,449 | 115,977 | |
| Fine Gael | Nina Carberry | 10.87 | 73,888 | 74,000 | 74,110 | 74,193 | 74,286 | 74,349 | 74,592 | 74,955 | 75,090 | 75,672 | 76,946 | 77,205 | 78,474 | 78,717 | 80,364 | 82,086 | 86,268 | 86,865 | 90,842 | 98,118 | 98,872 |
| Fine Gael | Maria Walsh | 10.51 | 71,476 | 71,580 | 71,693 | 71,780 | 71,879 | 72,027 | 72,067 | 72,174 | 72,415 | 73,096 | 75,834 | 76,491 | 78,048 | 78,204 | 79,310 | 83,060 | 84,935 | 86,401 | 90,015 | 100,454 | 100,781 |
| Independent Ireland | Ciaran Mullooly | 8.42 | 57,297 | 57,419 | 57,530 | 57,809 | 58,260 | 58,396 | 58,513 | 58,802 | 59,606 | 59,931 | 60,409 | 61,888 | 62,598 | 65,619 | 68,663 | 71,107 | 71,933 | 73,101 | 83,194 | 86,689 | 88,177 |
| Sinn Féin | Michelle Gildernew | 6.74 | 45,807 | 45,917 | 45,957 | 46,050 | 46,093 | 46,383 | 46,485 | 46,826 | 47,032 | 47,345 | 47,833 | 48,074 | 49,584 | 50,151 | 51,254 | 53,129 | 54,103 | 74,795 | 79,398 | 81,639 | 82,723 |
| Fianna Fáil | Lisa Chambers | 6.48 | 44,069 | 44,135 | 44,183 | 44,242 | 44,297 | 44,355 | 44,474 | 44,753 | 44,900 | 45,212 | 46,200 | 46,424 | 47,296 | 47,416 | 48,578 | 50,648 | 59,664 | 60,537 | 62,818 | | |
| Aontú | Peadar Tóibín | 5.99 | 40,742 | 40,814 | 41,018 | 41,223 | 41,564 | 41,696 | 41,878 | 42,089 | 42,839 | 43,046 | 43,641 | 46,447 | 47,057 | 50,735 | 53,222 | 54,531 | 55,399 | 56,633 | | | |
| Fianna Fáil | Niall Blaney | 4.47 | 30,387 | 30,418 | 30,439 | 30,465 | 30,492 | 30,523 | 31,118 | 31,281 | 31,356 | 31,484 | 31,696 | 31,850 | 32,085 | 32,205 | 33,598 | 34,074 | | | | | |
| Sinn Féin | Chris MacManus | 4.33 | 29,427 | 29,491 | 29,527 | 29,606 | 29,667 | 30,053 | 30,107 | 30,212 | 30,408 | 30,663 | 31,045 | 31,387 | 32,333 | 32,889 | 33,616 | 35,235 | 36,157 | | | | |
| Independent | Peter Casey | 3.10 | 21,102 | 21,219 | 21,309 | 21,433 | 21,586 | 21,654 | 22,014 | 22,994 | 23,437 | 23,535 | 23,643 | 25,054 | 25,275 | 28,497 | | | | | | | |
| Independent | Saoirse McHugh | 2.79 | 18,976 | 19,343 | 19,464 | 19,744 | 19,802 | 20,360 | 20,414 | 20,546 | 21,049 | 21,547 | 23,848 | 24,801 | 29,234 | 29,928 | 31,519 | | | | | | |
| Social Democrats | Rory Hearne | 2.21 | 15,023 | 15,102 | 15,172 | 15,201 | 15,210 | 15,825 | 15,852 | 15,942 | 15,977 | 16,926 | 19,202 | 19,279 | | | | | | | | | |
| Irish Freedom | Hermann Kelly | 2.04 | 13,904 | 13,967 | 14,084 | 14,562 | 14,950 | 15,003 | 15,550 | 16,543 | 17,210 | 17,273 | 17,313 | 20,885 | 21,029 | | | | | | | | |
| Green | Pauline O'Reilly | 2.02 | 13,710 | 13,777 | 13,816 | 13,889 | 13,917 | 14,157 | 14,170 | 14,220 | 14,253 | 15,283 | | | | | | | | | | | |
| Independent | John Waters | 2.01 | 13,692 | 13,746 | 14,806 | 15,033 | 15,384 | 15,498 | 15,768 | 16,009 | 17,019 | 17,088 | 17,206 | | | | | | | | | | |
| Labour | Fergal Landy | 1.03 | 6,970 | 7,024 | 7,041 | 7,070 | 7,078 | 7,238 | 7,246 | 7,321 | 7,350 | | | | | | | | | | | | |
| Independent | Michelle Smith | 0.99 | 6,713 | 6,784 | 6,889 | 6,938 | 7,000 | 7,032 | 7,050 | 7,102 | | | | | | | | | | | | | |
| The Irish People | Anthony Cahill | 0.67 | 4,535 | 4,574 | 4,623 | 4,802 | 4,910 | 4,978 | 6,124 | | | | | | | | | | | | | | |
| National Party | Justin Barrett | 0.60 | 4,086 | 4,132 | 4,164 | 4,267 | 4,769 | 4,791 | | | | | | | | | | | | | | | |
| PBP–Solidarity | Brian O'Boyle | 0.59 | 3,982 | 4,037 | 4,083 | 4,138 | 4,170 | | | | | | | | | | | | | | | | |
| National Party | James Reynolds | 0.47 | 3,201 | 3,234 | 3,294 | 3,479 | | | | | | | | | | | | | | | | | |
| Ireland First | Margaret Maguire | 0.46 | 3,117 | 3,231 | 3,284 | | | | | | | | | | | | | | | | | | |
| Independent | Gerry Waters | 0.44 | 3,015 | 3,056 | | | | | | | | | | | | | | | | | | | |
| Independent | Charlotte Keenan | 0.16 | 1,102 | | | | | | | | | | | | | | | | | | | | |
| Independent | Stephen Garland | 0.16 | 1,079 | | | | | | | | | | | | | | | | | | | | |
| Independent | Daniel Pocock | 0.08 | 524 | | | | | | | | | | | | | | | | | | | | |
Electorate: 1,318,190 Valid: 679,946 Spoilt: 20,754 Quota: 113,325 Turnout: 700,700 (53.10%)

2019–2024 boundaries

=== 2019 election ===
2019 European Parliament election: Midlands–North-West (4 seats)
| Party | Candidate | FPv% | Count | | | | | | | | | | | | |
| Party | Candidate | FPv% | 1 | 2 | 3 | 4 | 5 | 6 | 7 | 8 | 9 | 10 | 11 | 12 | 13 |
|---|---|---|---|---|---|---|---|---|---|---|---|---|---|---|---|
| Fine Gael | Mairead McGuinness | 22.6% | 134,630 | | | | | | | | | | | | |
| Independent | Luke 'Ming' Flanagan | 14.3% | 85,034 | 86,906 | 87,008 | 87,188 | 87,333 | 87,964 | 88,543 | 90,187 | 91,747 | 94,353 | 97,319 | 112,760 | 121,824 |
| Sinn Féin | Matt Carthy | 13.0% | 77,619 | 78,487 | 78,513 | 78,612 | 78,653 | 79,028 | 79,437 | 81,544 | 82,921 | 83,851 | 84,825 | 91,396 | 98,732 |
| Fine Gael | Maria Walsh | 10.8% | 64,500 | 70,536 | 70,619 | 70,660 | 70,731 | 71,425 | 71,793 | 72,265 | 74,116 | 76,056 | 80,338 | 96,163 | 107,192 |
| Independent | Peter Casey | 9.5% | 56,650 | 57,848 | 57,892 | 58,034 | 58,212 | 58,602 | 59,635 | 60,769 | 61,616 | 64,690 | 66,565 | 69,923 | 78,362 |
| Green | Saoirse McHugh | 8.6% | 51,019 | 52,731 | 52,821 | 52,976 | 53,068 | 53,966 | 54,548 | 55,455 | 58,642 | 60,778 | 61,957 | | |
| Fianna Fáil | Brendan Smith | 7.2% | 42,814 | 44,040 | 44,059 | 44,076 | 44,130 | 44,255 | 44,692 | 44,836 | 45,235 | 46,820 | 64,532 | 68,677 | |
| Fianna Fáil | Anne Rabbitte | 5.1% | 30,220 | 31,084 | 31,122 | 31,143 | 31,198 | 31,471 | 31,893 | 32,041 | 32,714 | 34,610 | | | |
| Independent | Fidelma Healy Eames | 2.7% | 15,991 | 16,468 | 16,515 | 16,621 | 16,764 | 17,590 | 19,312 | 19,694 | 20,410 | | | | |
| Labour | Dominic Hannigan | 2.1% | 12,378 | 13,031 | 13,065 | 13,150 | 13,197 | 13,408 | 13,723 | 14,089 | | | | | |
| Solidarity–PBP | Cyril Brennan | 1.4% | 8,130 | 8,226 | 8,246 | 8,337 | 8,365 | 8,553 | 8,699 | | | | | | |
| Renua | Michael O'Dowd | 1.2% | 6,897 | 7,200 | 7,220 | 7,304 | 7,445 | 7,677 | | | | | | | |
| Independent | Olive O'Connor | 0.5% | 3,132 | 3,236 | 3,313 | 3,326 | 3,477 | | | | | | | | |
| Independent | Dilip Mahapatra | 0.4% | 2,450 | 2,562 | 2,577 | 2,654 | 2,694 | | | | | | | | |
| Direct Democracy | Patrick Greene | 0.2% | 1,352 | 1,400 | 1,412 | | | | | | | | | | |
| Independent | James Miller | 0.2% | 1,322 | 1,375 | 1,446 | 1,490 | | | | | | | | | |
| Independent | Diarmuid Mulcahy | 0.1% | 789 | 811 | | | | | | | | | | | |
Electorate: 1,224,888 Valid: 594,927 Spoilt: 21,628 (3.5%) Quota: 118,986 Turnout: 616,555 (50.3%)

=== 2014 election ===
2014 European Parliament election: Midlands–North-West (4 seats)
| Party | Candidate | FPv% | Count | | | | | | | |
| Party | Candidate | FPv% | 1 | 2 | 3 | 4 | 5 | 6 | 7 | 8 |
|---|---|---|---|---|---|---|---|---|---|---|
| Independent | Luke 'Ming' Flanagan | 19.2 | 124,063 | 129,561 | | | | | | |
| Sinn Féin | Matt Carthy | 17.7 | 114,727 | 117,670 | 120,723 | 124,976 | 126,492 | 127,135 | 135,046 | |
| Fine Gael | Mairead McGuinness | 14.2 | 92,080 | 94,019 | 102,025 | 107,689 | 135,698 | | | |
| Independent | Marian Harkin | 10.7 | 68,986 | 72,045 | 77,798 | 89,611 | 95,577 | 99,843 | 105,501 | 106,520 |
| Fianna Fáil | Pat "the Cope" Gallagher | 9.2 | 59,562 | 60,466 | 62,071 | 65,725 | 67,606 | 68,440 | 102,915 | 106,245 |
| Fianna Fáil | Thomas Byrne | 8.6 | 55,384 | 56,528 | 58,505 | 62,335 | 63,392 | 64,057 | | |
| Fine Gael | Jim Higgins | 6.2 | 39,908 | 40,462 | 43,292 | 45,060 | | | | |
| Independent | Rónán Mullen | 5.6 | 36,326 | 38,260 | 41,164 | | | | | |
| Labour | Lorraine Higgins | 4.9 | 31,951 | 33,744 | | | | | | |
| Green | Mark Dearey | 1.5 | 9,520 | | | | | | | |
| Direct Democracy | Ben Gilroy | 1.2 | 7,683 | | | | | | | |
| Independent | Mark Fitzsimons | 0.4 | 2,424 | | | | | | | |
| Independent | T. J. Fay | 0.3 | 2,002 | | | | | | | |
| Fís Nua | Cordelia Níc Fhearraigh | 0.3 | 1,829 | | | | | | | |
Electorate: 1,202,997 Valid: 646,445 Spoilt: 17,258 (1.4%) Quota: 129,290 Turnout: 663,703 (55.2%)
