= Pfizergate =

Vaccine-related scandal in the EU

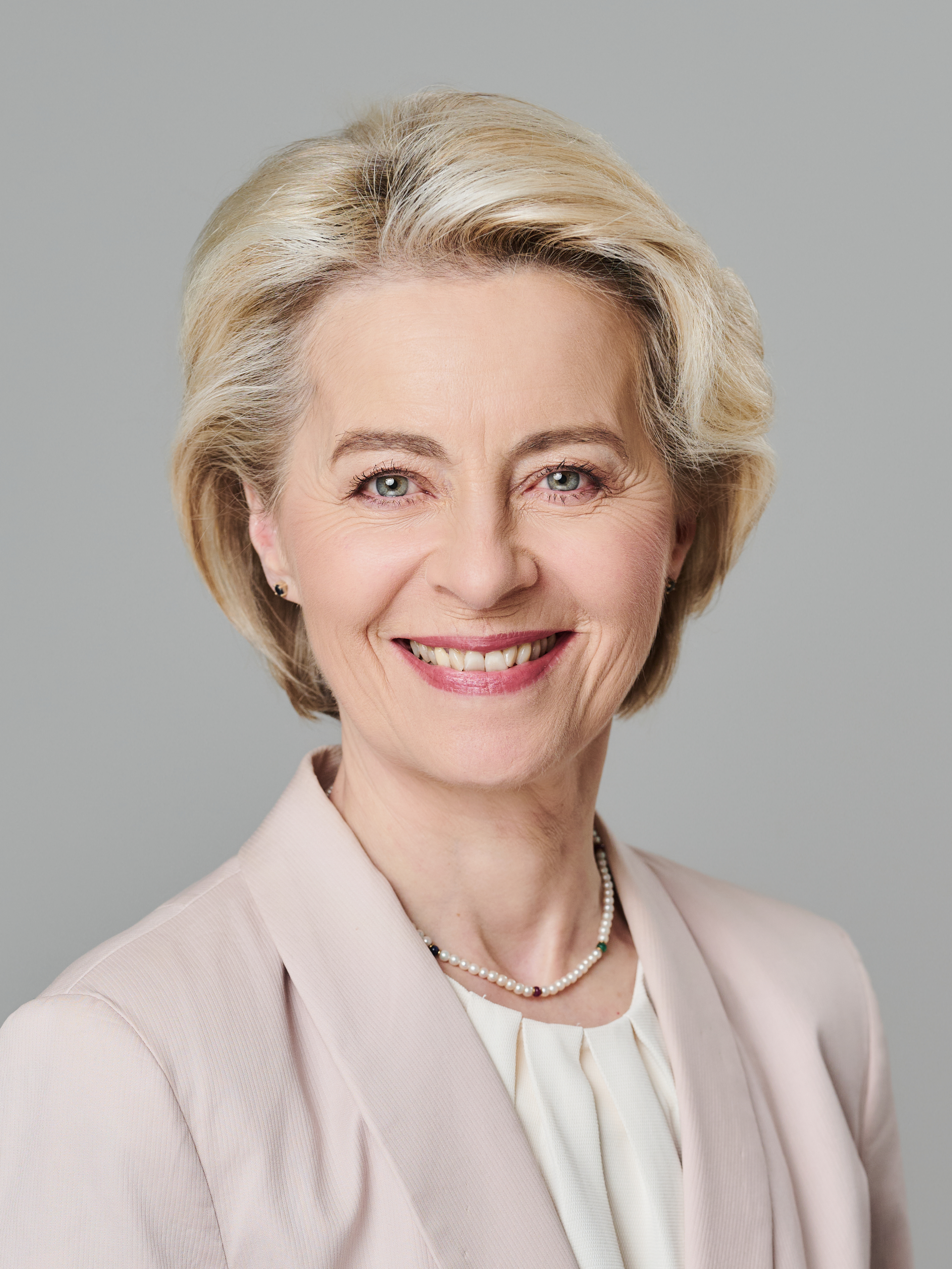
Ursula von der Leyen

Pfizergate is a scandal involving European Commission President Ursula von der Leyen and the American pharmaceutical company Pfizer over the procurement of COVID-19 vaccines. The concerns centered on the lack of transparency in the communication and negotiation processes for purchasing a significant number of vaccine doses during the COVID-19 pandemic.

== Timeline of events ==
=== Background and initial revelation ===
In February 2021, the situation in the European Union due to the pandemic was worsening, as lockdowns continued, people kept dying, and the union's biggest vaccine supplier, AstraZeneca, was having production problems, which caused a shortage of doses. Shortly afterwards, it was announced that the EU was about to sign a deal with Pfizer worth €35 billion to provide 900 million doses of the Pfizer–BioNTech COVID-19 vaccine through 2023, with an additional 900 million doses available for purchase.

On 28 April 2021, as the deal was about to be finalized, The New York Times reported that Ursula von der Leyen had personally negotiated the deal via a series of text messages and calls with Pfizer CEO Albert Bourla, describing it as "a striking alignment of political survival and corporate hustle".

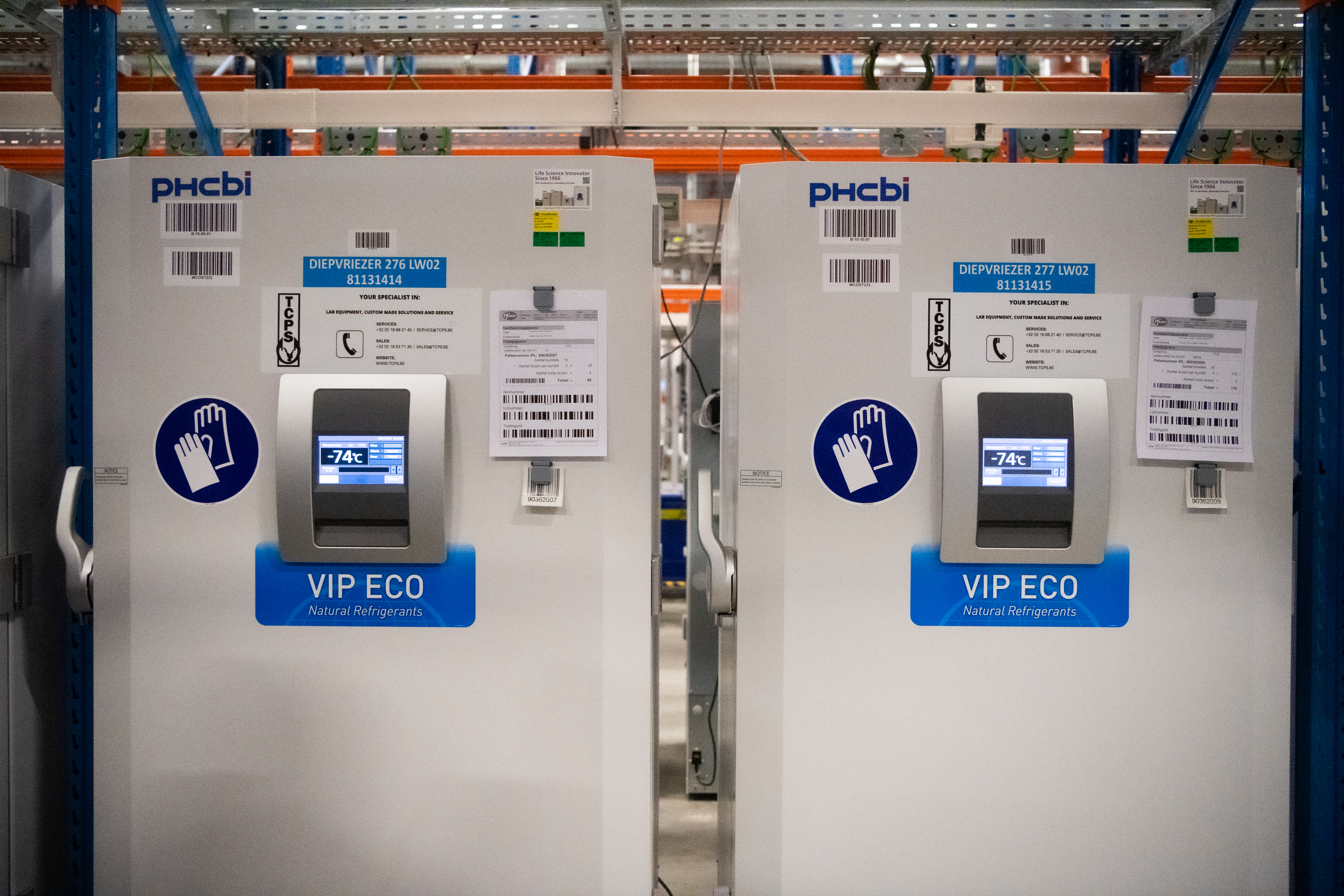
Pfizer COVID-19 vaccine factory in Puurs, Belgium

Von der Leyen previously used her phone to award contracts worth several hundred million euros while acting as defense minister of Germany, effectively bypassing public procurement processes. She subsequently deleted all messages from her phone when investigators probed her. While awarding the COVID-19 vaccine contracts worth billions of euros as head of EU commission, she similarly bypassed procurement processes via her phone and withheld messages on it.

=== Investigations and responses ===
Throughout the Summer of 2021, the German news website Netzpolitik.org requested access to these messages, but the request was refused. Afterwards, they turned to the European Ombudsman, Emily O'Reilly, who opened an investigation on 16 September. She too was refused access to the messages, with the Commission claiming they had no obligation to conserve the messages. This statements led the Ombudsman to file a complaint in January 2022, accusing them of maladministration and urging the EU executive to "conduct a more thorough search for relevant messages". In response, EU Transparency Commissioner Věra Jourová said the search for text messages between von der Leyen and Bourla "did not yield any results". Finally, on 12 July 2022, the Ombudsman severely criticized the Commission and, against that background, confirmed her finding of maladministration.

Later, in October, the European Public Prosecutor's Office (EPPO), an independent EU body responsible for investigating and prosecuting financial crimes, exceptionally confirmed that it had an ongoing investigation into the acquisition of COVID-19 vaccines in the European Union. In the same month, Commission Vice-President Margaritis Schinas stated in defense of the Commission that "the handling of this access to documents request leaves the regrettable impression of an EU institution that is not forthcoming on matters of significant public interest", adding that "nobody can negotiate the complexity of these contracts, by SMS or alone. This was a very well-structured procedure between the member states and the Commission".

In January 2023, lawmakers in the Parliament's special committee on COVID-19 proposed to invite von der Leyen to answer questions on the contract. However, in February, the Conference of Presidents of the European Parliament refused the request to hold a public grilling. Instead they decided to ask von der Leyen to answer questions in private at some point in the future.

=== Legal actions ===
==== Legal action by The New York Times ====
Stevi and The New York Times v Commission

Original jurisdiction Decided 14 May 2025
- Case: T‑36/23
- CelexID: 62023TJ0036
- ECLI: ECLI:EU:T:2025:483
- Chamber: Grand Chamber
- Language of proceedings: English

On 25 January 2023, The New York Times lodged a lawsuit with the EU General Court over access to text messages between Albert Bourla and Ursula von der Leyen. In November 2024, the General Court held a public hearing in the case. The central question in the case was whether text messages should be considered as documents, that public authorities can be requested to disclose. The New York Times lawyer Bondine Kloostra raised the concern that EU lawmakers could circumvent transparency by using text messages instead of other means of communication. EU Scream called the case "one of the highest profile cases of accountability journalism in Europe."

Brussels bureau chief of The New York Times Matina Stevis-Gridneff, who initially reported that the deal between Pfizer and the European Commission has been struck using text messages, is party to the lawsuit. Stevis-Gridneff contrasted in an interview the squeamishness of the European Commission to disclose information to the public with a greater accountability and transparency by lawmakers in the US. On 14 May 2025, the Grand Chamber of the General Court ruled in favour of The New York Times annulling the decision of the European Commission to withhold the texts. The Commission did not appeal the judgement allowing it to become final.

The judgement is said to enhance transparency by obligating EU institutions to proactively retain documentation in order to enable effective exercise of access rights. When an EU institution does not possess a requested document they have to also provide a plausible explanation why the requested document could not be retained and how they have tried to retrieve it.

==== Legal action under Belgian law ====
In April 2023, Frédéric Baldan, a Belgian lobbyist specializing in EU-China trade relation, filed a lawsuit against von der Leyen before a Liège court, accusing her of usurping official powers, destroying public documents, pursuing illicit interests and committing corruption, and damaging his country's public finances. Shortly after, Baldan's lobbyist accreditation was withdrawn by the European Parliament.

In early May 2024, a few days before the hearing in Liège was supposed to take place, Baldan's lawyer, Diane Protat, visited the EPPO's offices in Brussels and Luxembourg to request a copy of its case file, but she was told that there was no such file and security was called on her. A few days later, it was reported that Hungary and Poland had joined the lawsuit. By the end of the month, the plaintiff told that he opposed the re-election of von der Leyen as the President of the European Commission "as long as she is the subject of criminal proceedings".

== Other use of the term ==
The term "Pfizergate" was also used after a report from the British Medical Journal raised concerns over the data integrity and regulatory oversight of the Pfizer vaccine trials.
