= Michael McNamara (politician) =

Irish politician (born 1974)

Michael McNamara MEP
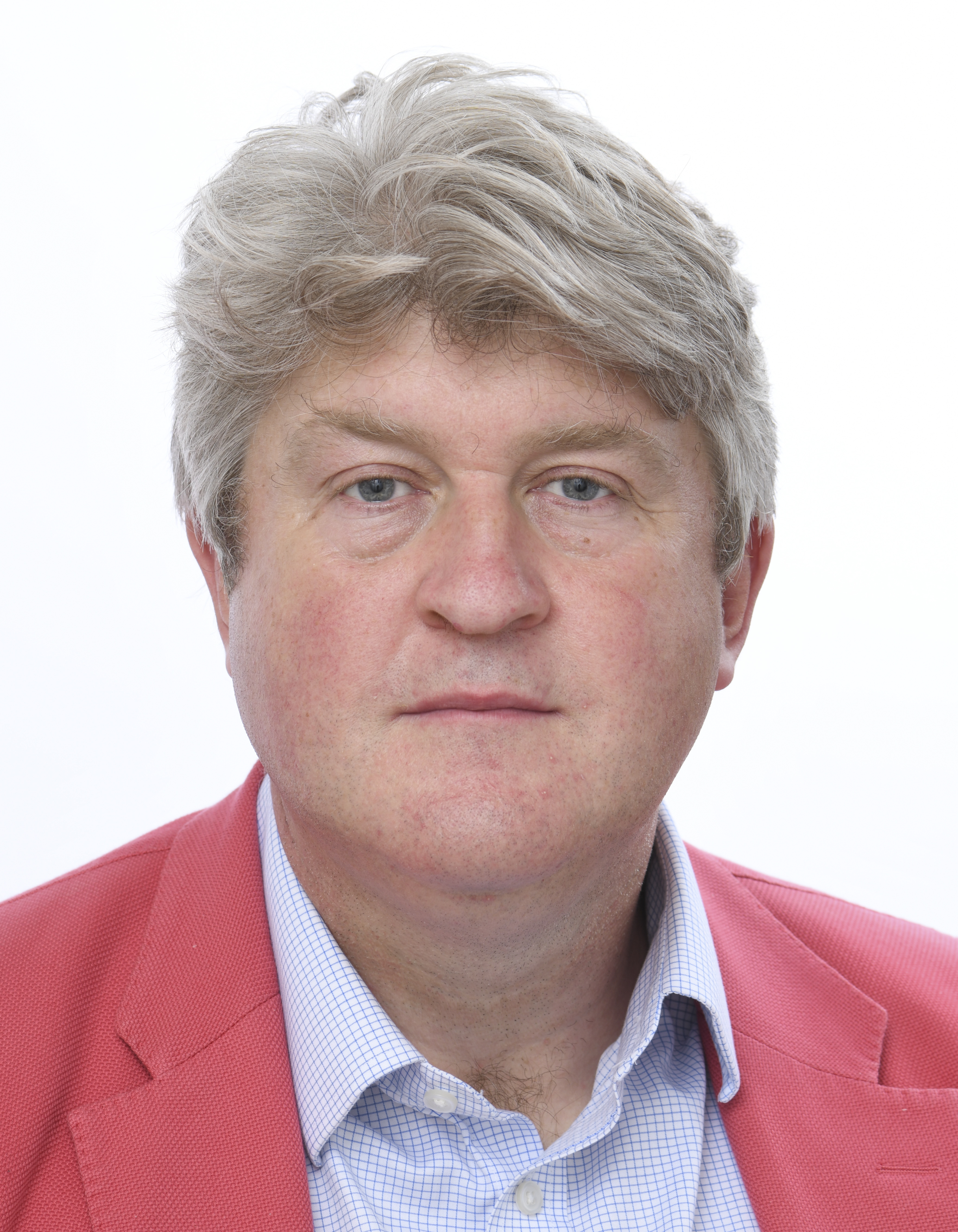
- McNamara in 2024

Member of the European Parliament
- Incumbent
- Assumed office 17 July 2024
- Constituency: South

Teachta Dála
- In office February 2020 – 17 July 2024
- In office February 2011 – February 2016
- Constituency: Clare

Chairman of the Special Committee on the COVID-19 Response
- In office 12 May 2020 – 8 October 2020
- Preceded by: Committee established
- Succeeded by: Committee dissolved

Personal details
- Born: 1 March 1974 (age 52) Limerick, Ireland
- Party: Ireland: Independent; EU: Renew Europe
- Other political affiliations: Labour Party (until 2017)
- Spouse: Sarah Jane Hillery (m. 2015)
- Children: 2
- Education: University College Cork; King's Inns

Michael McNamara (born 1 March 1974) is an Irish independent politician who has been a Member of the European Parliament (MEP) from Ireland for the South constituency since July 2024. He was previously a Teachta Dála (TD) for Clare from the 2020 general election to 2024, and from 2011 to 2016.

== Political career ==
McNamara contested the 2009 European Parliament election in the North-West constituency as an independent candidate, receiving 12,744 votes (2.6%) and failing to be elected. He was elected as a Labour Party TD for Clare at the 2011 general election. He was a member of the Oireachtas Committee on Agriculture, Food and the Marine, and a member of the Parliamentary Assembly of the Council of Europe from 2011 to 2016. McNamara is a barrister and has worked at the OSCE and on human rights and democracy projects of the European Union and United Nations. He was an unsuccessful independent candidate at the 2009 European Parliament election for the North-West constituency.

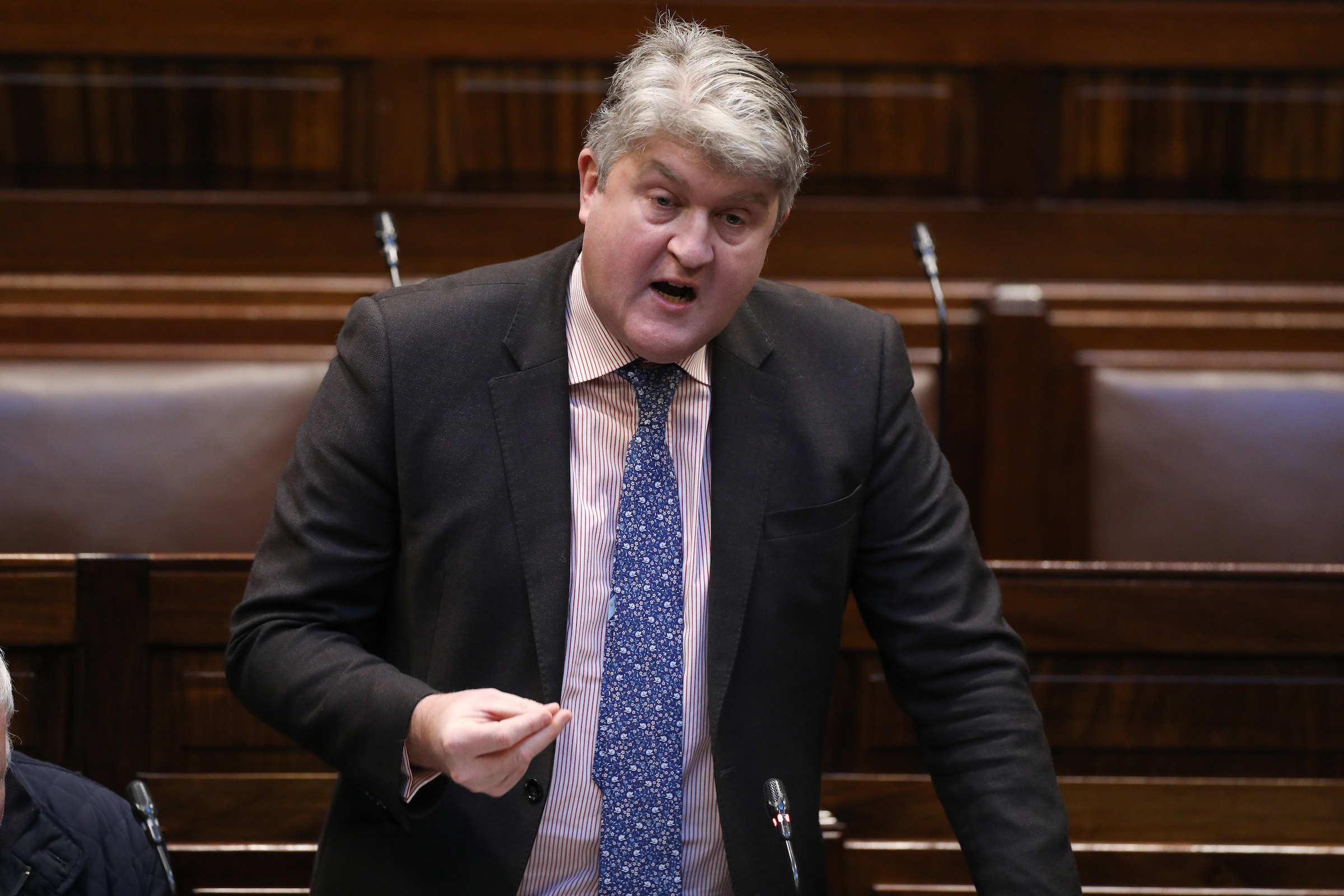
McNamara speaking in the Dáil in 2022

In May 2015, McNamara was expelled from the parliamentary Labour Party for voting against the government in the sale of Aer Lingus shares, the third time he voted against the government. He rejoined the parliamentary Labour Party in September 2015. He lost his seat at the 2016 general election.

He was elected as an independent candidate for the Clare constituency at the 2020 general election. He was the Chairman of the Special Committee on the COVID-19 Response from 12 May to 8 October 2020. McNamara campaigned for a No-No vote in the 2024 referendums on the Family and Care as a member of the Lawyers for No group, alongside fellow barristers Senator Michael McDowell, Maria Steen and Brenda Power.

McNamara was elected as an independent MEP for the South constituency at the 2024 European Parliament election. He took office on 17 July 2024. He sits with the Renew Europe parliamentary group.

== Personal life ==
He was born in Limerick. McNamara is married to Sarah Jane Hillery, the granddaughter of Patrick Hillery, who served as president of Ireland from 1976 to 1990. They have two children.

McNamara was stopped at his home on 10 December 2016 after he was followed there by a garda. McNamara was pepper sprayed outside the house in Scarriff, County Clare and was arrested. He was brought to a garda station where he passed a breathalyser test and was released without charge. As a result of this incident, in January 2018, he was banned from driving for two years and convicted of dangerous driving. In November 2018, McNamara's dangerous driving conviction was overturned, following a successful appeal at Ennis circuit court.

Dáil	Election	Deputy (Party)	Deputy (Party)	Deputy (Party)	Deputy (Party)	Deputy (Party)
2nd	1921	Éamon de Valera (SF)	Brian O'Higgins (SF)	Seán Liddy (SF)	Patrick Brennan (SF)	4 seats 1921–1923
3rd	1922	Éamon de Valera (AT-SF)	Brian O'Higgins (AT-SF)	Seán Liddy (PT-SF)	Patrick Brennan (PT-SF)	4 seats 1921–1923
4th	1923	Éamon de Valera (Rep)	Brian O'Higgins (Rep)	Conor Hogan (FP)	Patrick Hogan (Lab)	Eoin MacNeill (CnaG)
5th	1927 (Jun)	Éamon de Valera (FF)	Patrick Houlihan (FF)	Thomas Falvey (FP)	Patrick Hogan (Lab)	Patrick Kelly (CnaG)
6th	1927 (Sep)	Éamon de Valera (FF)	Patrick Houlihan (FF)	Martin Sexton (FF)	Patrick Hogan (Lab)	Patrick Kelly (CnaG)
7th	1932	Éamon de Valera (FF)	Seán O'Grady (FF)	Martin Sexton (FF)	Patrick Hogan (Lab)	Patrick Burke (CnaG)
8th	1933	Éamon de Valera (FF)	Seán O'Grady (FF)	Patrick Houlihan (FF)	Patrick Hogan (Lab)	Patrick Burke (CnaG)
9th	1937	Éamon de Valera (FF)	Seán O'Grady (FF)	Thomas Burke (FP)	Patrick Hogan (Lab)	Patrick Burke (FG)
10th	1938	Éamon de Valera (FF)	Seán O'Grady (FF)	Thomas Burke (FP)	Peter O'Loghlen (FF)	Patrick Burke (FG)
11th	1943	Éamon de Valera (FF)	Seán O'Grady (FF)	Thomas Burke (FP)	Patrick Hogan (Lab)	Patrick Burke (FG)
12th	1944	Éamon de Valera (FF)	Seán O'Grady (FF)	Thomas Burke (FP)	Peter O'Loghlen (FF)	Patrick Burke (FG)
12th	1945 by-election	Éamon de Valera (FF)	Seán O'Grady (FF)	Thomas Burke (FP)	Peter O'Loghlen (FF)	Patrick Shanahan (FF)
13th	1948	Éamon de Valera (FF)	Seán O'Grady (FF)	Thomas Burke (FP)	Patrick Hogan (Lab)	4 seats 1948–1969
14th	1951	Éamon de Valera (FF)	Patrick Hillery (FF)	William Murphy (FG)	Patrick Hogan (Lab)	4 seats 1948–1969
15th	1954	Éamon de Valera (FF)	Patrick Hillery (FF)	William Murphy (FG)	Patrick Hogan (Lab)	4 seats 1948–1969
16th	1957	Éamon de Valera (FF)	Patrick Hillery (FF)	William Murphy (FG)	Patrick Hogan (Lab)	4 seats 1948–1969
16th	1959 by-election	Seán Ó Ceallaigh (FF)	Patrick Hillery (FF)	William Murphy (FG)	Patrick Hogan (Lab)	4 seats 1948–1969
17th	1961	Seán Ó Ceallaigh (FF)	Patrick Hillery (FF)	William Murphy (FG)	Patrick Hogan (Lab)	4 seats 1948–1969
18th	1965	Seán Ó Ceallaigh (FF)	Patrick Hillery (FF)	William Murphy (FG)	Patrick Hogan (Lab)	4 seats 1948–1969
18th	1968 by-election	Seán Ó Ceallaigh (FF)	Patrick Hillery (FF)	Sylvester Barrett (FF)	Patrick Hogan (Lab)	4 seats 1948–1969
19th	1969	Frank Taylor (FG)	Patrick Hillery (FF)	Sylvester Barrett (FF)	3 seats 1969–1981	
20th	1973	Frank Taylor (FG)	Brendan Daly (FF)	Sylvester Barrett (FF)	3 seats 1969–1981	
21st	1977	Frank Taylor (FG)	Brendan Daly (FF)	Sylvester Barrett (FF)	3 seats 1969–1981	
22nd	1981	Madeleine Taylor (FG)	Brendan Daly (FF)	Sylvester Barrett (FF)	Bill Loughnane (FF)	4 seats since 1981
23rd	1982 (Feb)	Donal Carey (FG)	Brendan Daly (FF)	Sylvester Barrett (FF)	Bill Loughnane (FF)	4 seats since 1981
24th	1982 (Nov)	Donal Carey (FG)	Brendan Daly (FF)	Sylvester Barrett (FF)	Madeleine Taylor-Quinn (FG)	4 seats since 1981
25th	1987	Donal Carey (FG)	Brendan Daly (FF)	Síle de Valera (FF)	Madeleine Taylor-Quinn (FG)	4 seats since 1981
26th	1989	Donal Carey (FG)	Brendan Daly (FF)	Síle de Valera (FF)	Madeleine Taylor-Quinn (FG)	4 seats since 1981
27th	1992	Donal Carey (FG)	Moosajee Bhamjee (Lab)	Síle de Valera (FF)	Tony Killeen (FF)	4 seats since 1981
28th	1997	Donal Carey (FG)	Brendan Daly (FF)	Síle de Valera (FF)	Tony Killeen (FF)	4 seats since 1981
29th	2002	Pat Breen (FG)	James Breen (Ind.)	Síle de Valera (FF)	Tony Killeen (FF)	4 seats since 1981
30th	2007	Pat Breen (FG)	Joe Carey (FG)	Timmy Dooley (FF)	Tony Killeen (FF)	4 seats since 1981
31st	2011	Pat Breen (FG)	Joe Carey (FG)	Timmy Dooley (FF)	Michael McNamara (Lab)	4 seats since 1981
32nd	2016	Pat Breen (FG)	Joe Carey (FG)	Timmy Dooley (FF)	Michael Harty (Ind.)	4 seats since 1981
33rd	2020	Violet-Anne Wynne (SF)	Joe Carey (FG)	Cathal Crowe (FF)	Michael McNamara (Ind.)	4 seats since 1981
34th	2024	Donna McGettigan (SF)	Joe Cooney (FG)	Cathal Crowe (FF)	Timmy Dooley (FF)	4 seats since 1981
