= 2024 European Parliament election in Ireland =

- 7 June 2024

14 Irish seats to the European Parliament
- Opinion polls
- Turnout: 1,800,226 (50.7% ▲1.0 pp)
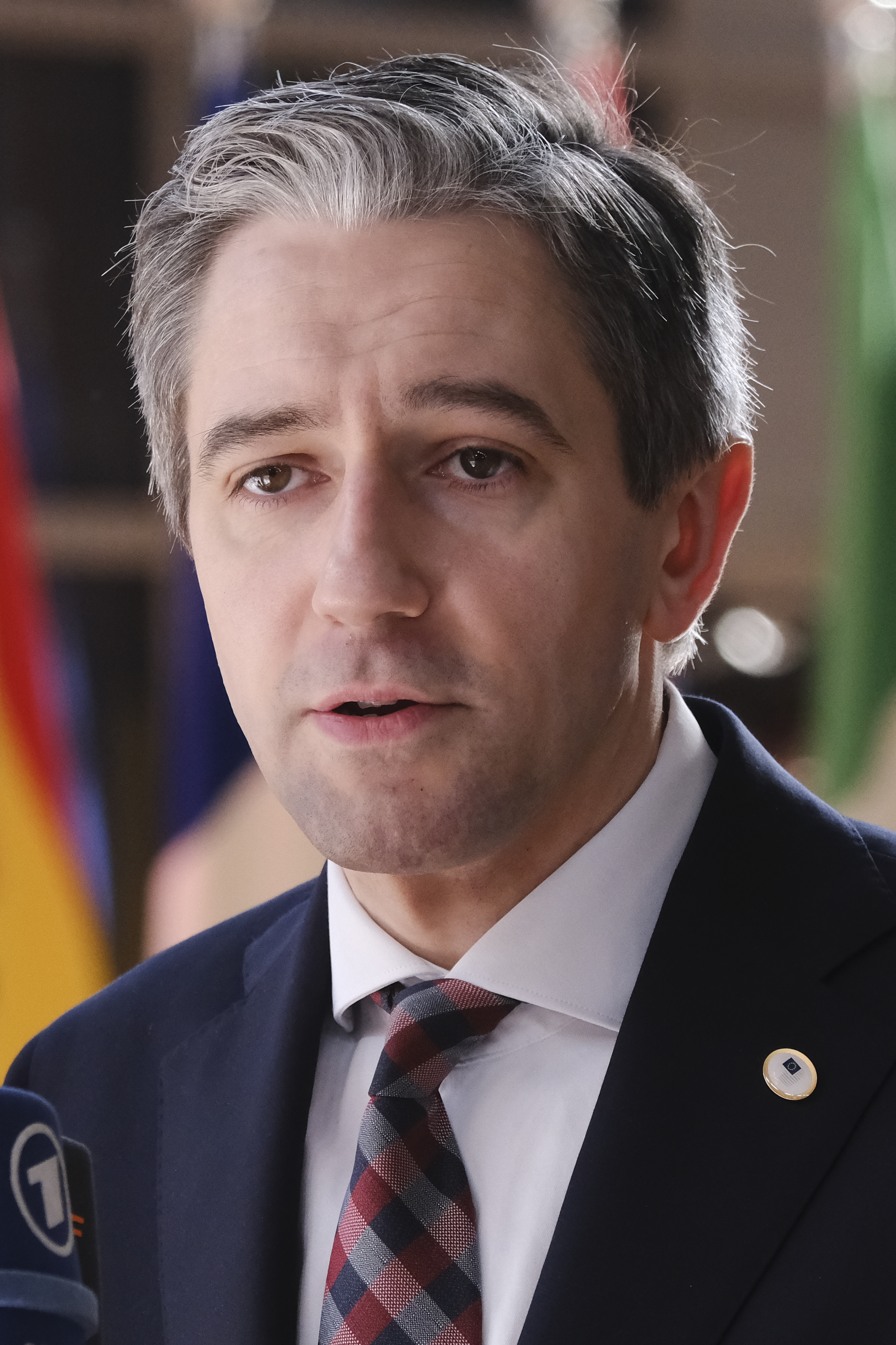

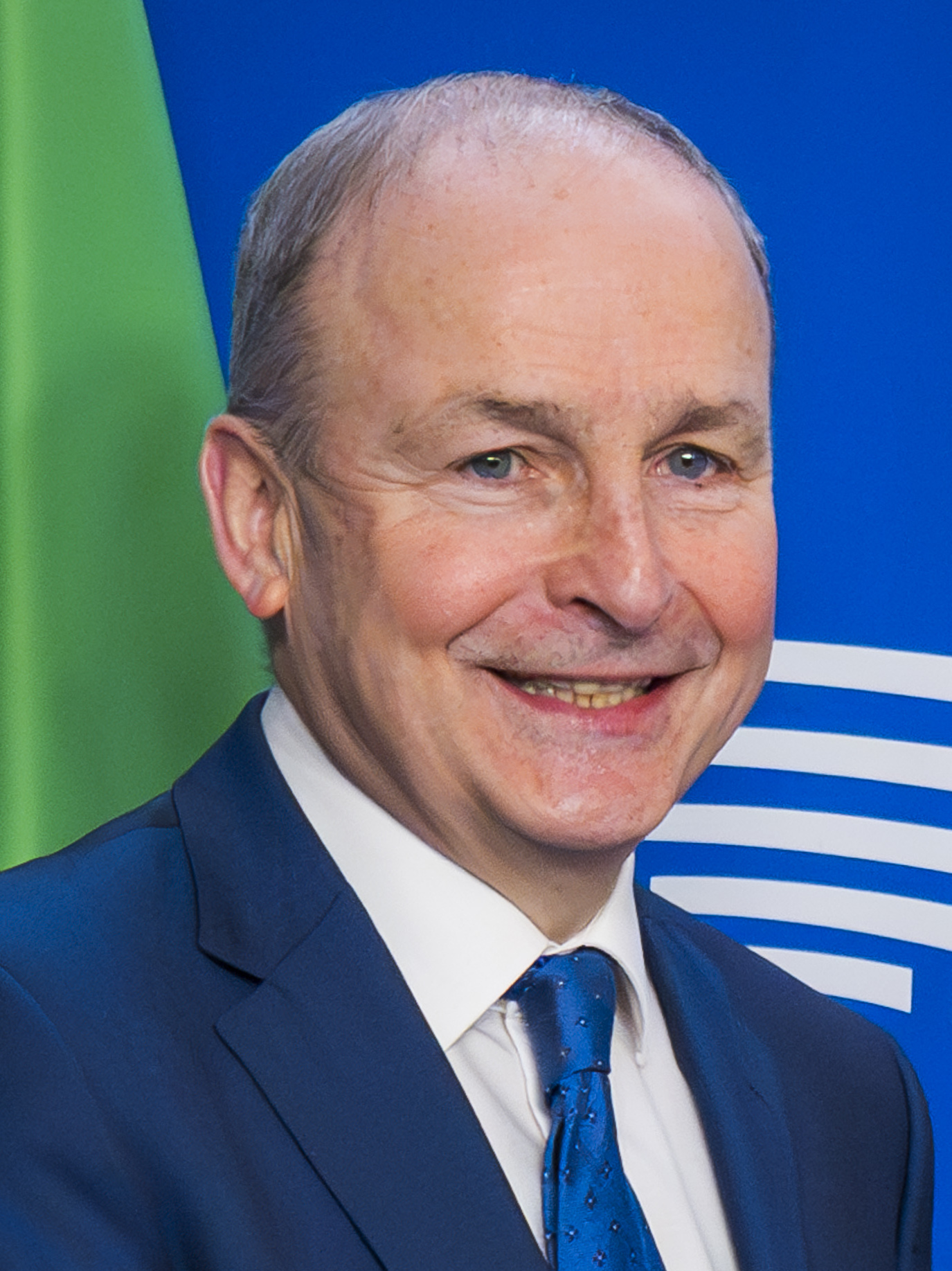

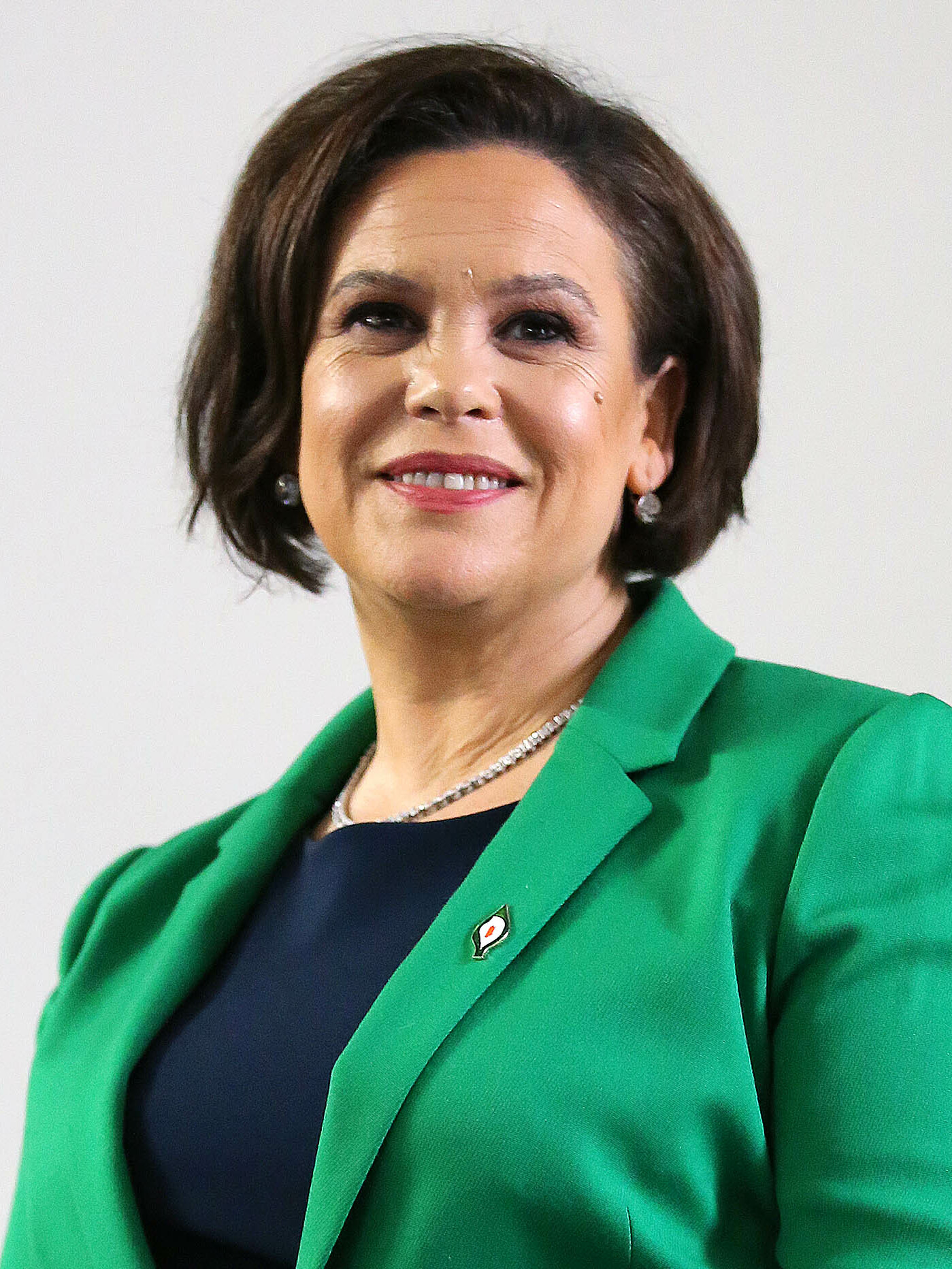

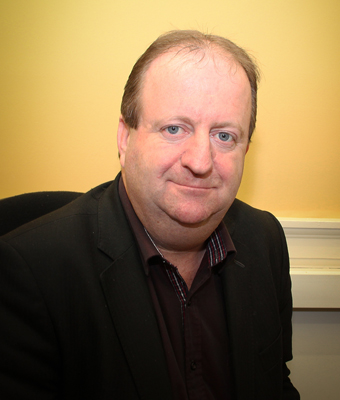

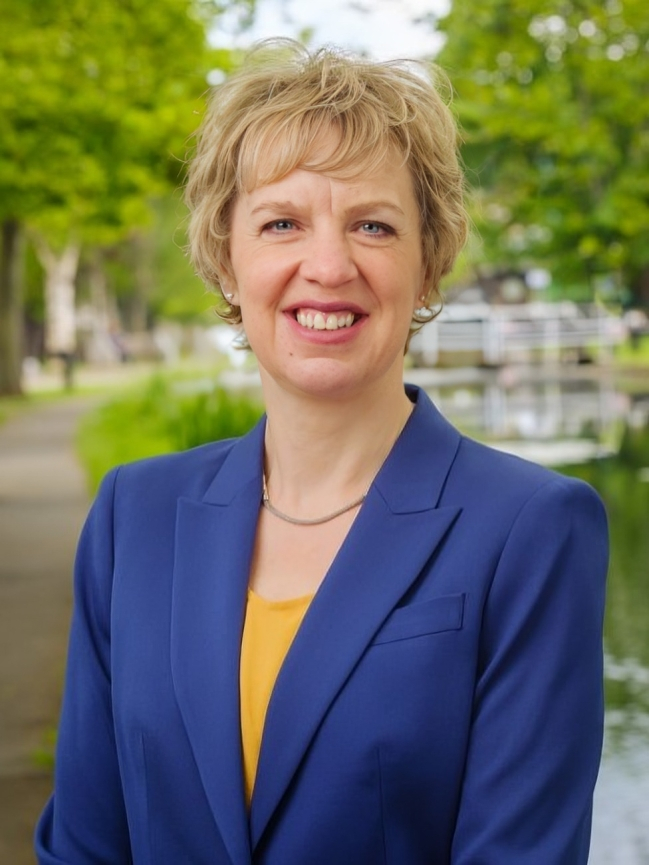

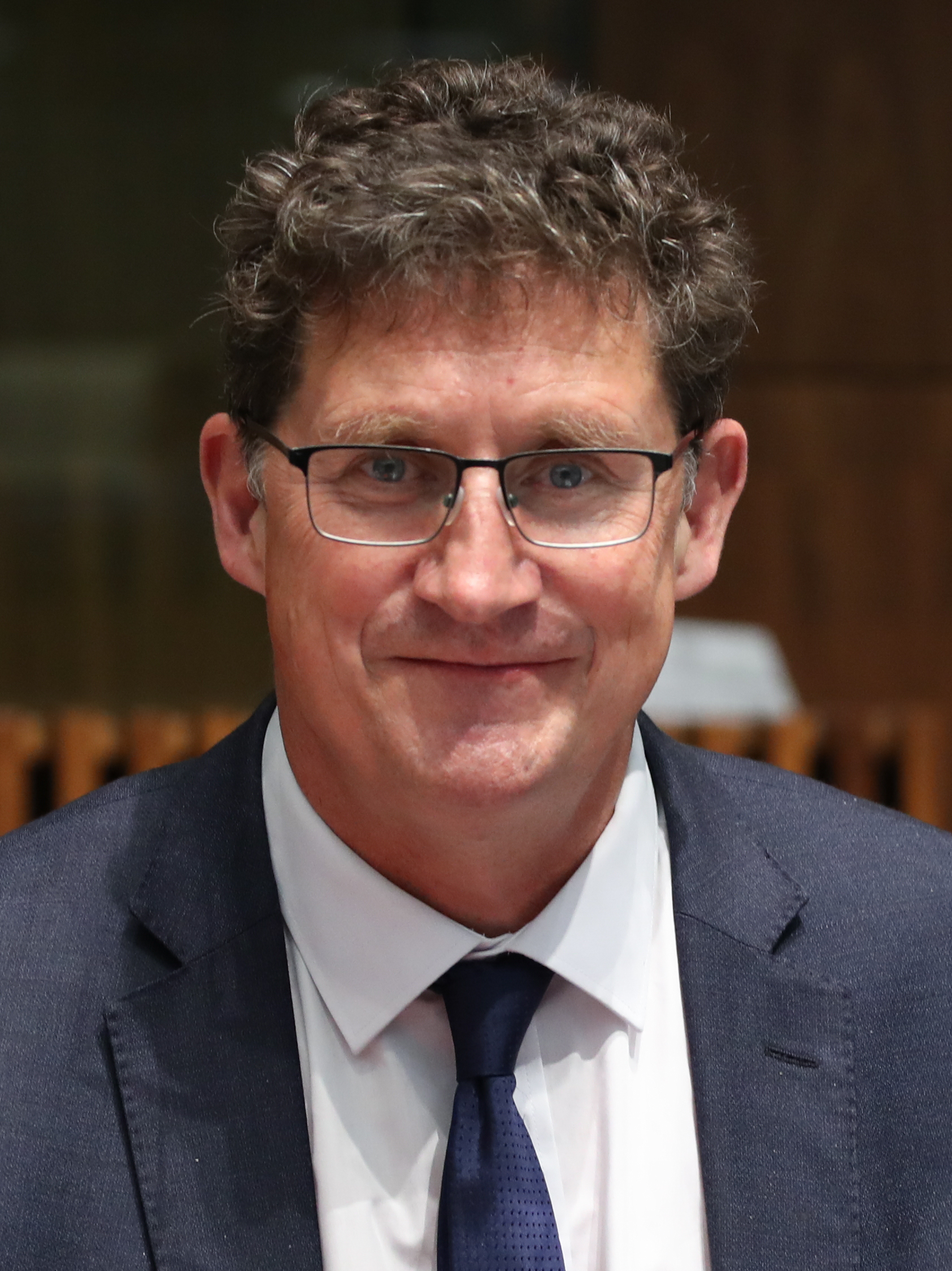

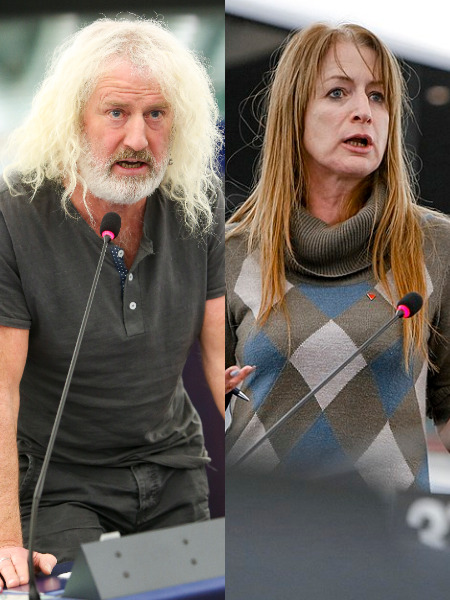
	First party	Second party	Third party
Leader	Simon Harris	Micheál Martin	Mary Lou McDonald
Party	Fine Gael	Fianna Fáil	Sinn Féin
Alliance	EPP	Renew	The Left
Last election	29.6%, 5 seats	16.6%, 2 seats	11.7%, 1 seat
Seats won	4 / 14	4 / 14	2 / 14
Seat change	▼1	▲2	▲1
Popular vote	362,766	356,794	194,403
Percentage	20.8%	20.4%	11.1%
Swing	▼8.8 pp	▲3.8 pp	▼0.6 pp
	Fourth party	Fifth party	Sixth party
Leader	Michael Collins	Ivana Bacik	Eamon Ryan
Party	Independent Ireland	Labour	Green
Alliance	Renew	S&D	Greens–EFA
Last election	New Party	3.1%, 0 seats	11.4%, 2 seats
Seats won	1 / 14	1 / 14	0 / 14
Seat change	▲1	▲1	▼2
Popular vote	108,685	58,975	93,575
Percentage	6.2%	3.4%	5.4%
Swing	N/A	▲0.3 pp	▼6.0 pp
	Seventh party
Leader	Collective leadership (Note: Pictured here are the party's two successful candidates in the 2019 election, Mick Wallace and Clare Daly.)
Party	Inds. 4 Change
Alliance	The Left
Last election	7.4%, 2 seats
Seats won	0 / 14
Seat change	▼2
Popular vote	79,658
Percentage	4.6%
Swing	▼2.8 pp

The 2024 European Parliament election in Ireland was the Irish component of the 2024 European Parliament election and was held on Friday, 7 June 2024, the same day as the Irish local elections and Limerick mayoral election.

== Electoral system ==
Ireland is entitled to 14 MEPs in the Tenth European Parliament. They are elected on the electoral system of proportional representation by means of the single transferable vote in three constituencies:

- Dublin (4 seats);
- Midlands–North-West (5 seats); and
- South (5 seats).

Thirteen MEPs were elected in 2019. However, the last candidate elected in Dublin and in South did not take their seats until January 2020, as part of the post-Brexit redistribution of seats. Ireland was allocated an additional seat in 2023 after a pre-election assessment of the parliament composition based on the most recent population figures. The Electoral Commission recommended this seat be given to Midlands–North-West, with the transfer of County Laois and County Offaly from the South constituency. This change was implemented by the Electoral (Amendment) Act 2023.

== Franchise ==
Irish citizens and other non-Irish EU citizens residing in the country are entitled to vote in the European elections in Ireland, provided that they are registered to vote for EU elections and that they have submitted a statutory declaration issued by the local authority of their residence. Irish citizens residing abroad cannot vote in Ireland in a referendum or election, including European election. In addition, those eligible to vote must turn 18 years old by election day at the latest.

== Outgoing delegation ==
The table shows the detailed composition of the Irish seats at the European Parliament as of 24 January 2024.

EP Group	Seats	Party	Seats	MEPs
European People's Party	5 / 13	Fine Gael	5	Deirdre Clune; Frances Fitzgerald; Seán Kelly; Colm Markey; Maria Walsh
The Left in the European Parliament	4 / 13	Independents 4 Change	2	Clare Daly; Mick Wallace
The Left in the European Parliament	4 / 13	Sinn Féin	1	Chris MacManus
The Left in the European Parliament	4 / 13	Independents	1	Luke 'Ming' Flanagan
Renew Europe	2 / 13	Fianna Fáil	2	Barry Andrews; Billy Kelleher
Greens–European Free Alliance	2 / 13	Green Party	2	Ciarán Cuffe; Grace O'Sullivan
Total			13	

=== Retiring incumbents ===
Constituency	Departing MEP	Party	EP Group	First elected	Date announced
South	Deirdre Clune	Fine Gael	EPP	2014	15 November 2023
Dublin	Frances Fitzgerald	Fine Gael	EPP	2019	6 November 2023
Midlands–North-West	Colm Markey	Fine Gael	EPP	2020	23 March 2024

== Campaign ==
=== Timeline ===
- 5 April: Ministerial order fixing the election date made by Darragh O'Brien, the Minister for Housing, Local Government and Heritage
- 15 April: Opening of the nomination period
- 22 April: Close of the nomination period for non-Irish EU citizens
- 30 April: Close of the nomination period for Irish citizens
- 8 May: Date on which posters may be erected
- 7 June: Polling day (7 a.m.–10 p.m.)
- 9 June: Counting of votes commences

=== Debates ===
On Monday 20 May 2024 RTÉ One's Upfront with Katie Hannon hosted a debate between eight candidates running in the Midlands-North-West constituency: Peter Casey (Ind), Barry Cowen (FF), Luke 'Ming' Flanagan (Ind), Saoirse McHugh (Ind), Chris MacManus (SF), Pauline O'Reilly (GP), Peadar Tóibín (Aon) and Maria Walsh (FG).

On Friday 30 May RTÉ One's Prime Time hosted 8 candidates from the South constituency: Lorna Bogue (Rabh), Paul Gavan (SF), Niamh Hourigan (Lab), Billy Kelleher (FF), Michael McNamara (Ind), John Mullins (FG), Grace O'Sullivan (GP) and Mick Wallace of (I4C).

On Tuesday 4 June RTÉ One's Prime Time hosted 8 candidates from the Dublin constituency: Barry Andrews (FF), Ciarán Cuffe (GP), Clare Daly (I4C), Regina Doherty (FG), Aodhán Ó Riordáin (Lab), Lynn Boylan (SF), Sinéad Gibney (SD) and Bríd Smith (PBP–S).

== Opinion polls ==
=== Nationwide party polling ===
Last date of polling	Polling firm / Commissioner	Sample size	SF Left	FF Renew	FG EPP	GP G/EFA	Lab S&D	SD	PBP–S	Aon	II	O/I (Note: The figure for 'Others/Independents' (including Independents 4 Change candidates) is the remainder when all others are removed. As with all such calculations, the figure shown may be slightly inaccurate due to rounding effects.)
27 May 2024	Ireland Thinks/The Journal	1,161	17.4	17.7	18	7.2	3.5	5.3	2.8	5 (Note: Includes 'Others'.)	– (Note: Not specifically mentioned in the report.)	23
22 May 2024	Red C/Business Post	1,021	21	14	20	5	3	5	4	3	–	25 (Note: Includes 21% for 'Independent' and 4% for 'Other Party'.)
15 May 2024	Ipsos B&A/Irish Times	1,500	16	22	19	4	6	3	3	2	4	21
7 May 2024	Ireland Thinks/The Journal	1,633	22	16	19	6	3	5	2	4	–	24
7 April 2024	Ireland Thinks/The Journal	1,334	23	17	20	6	3	6	3	5	–	17
7 February 2024	Ireland Thinks/The Journal	1,255	26	19	19	6	4	4	3	–	–	19
8 February 2020	2020 general election	—N/a	24.5	22.2	20.9	7.1	4.4	2.9	2.6	1.9	– (Note: Did not contest this election.)	13.5
24 May 2019	2019 EP election	—N/a	11.7	16.6	29.6	11.4	3.1	1.2	2.3	–	–	24.1

=== Candidate polling ===
==== Dublin ====
Last date of polling	Polling firm / Commissioner	Sample size	Andrews (FF)	L. Boylan (SF)	Doherty (FG)	Ó Riordáin (Lab)	Cuffe (GP)	Smith (PBP–S)	Daly (I4C)	Gibney (SD)	N. Boylan (II)	Doolan (SF)	Considine (Aon)	Others
31 May 2024	Ireland Thinks/Sunday Independent	496	14.1	11.2	15	7.4	7.4	4.8	8.3	4.6	9.2	3.4	2.1	12.5
15 May 2024	Ipsos B&A/The Irish Times	500	18	15	12	10	8	6	6	5	5	3	2	14
7 May 2024	Ireland Thinks/Sunday Independent	457	17	16	14	7	8	6	5	4	7	3	2	11

==== Midlands–North-West ====
Last date of polling	Polling firm / Commissioner	Sample size	Flanagan (Ind)	Walsh (FG)	Cowen (FF)	Chambers (FF)	Carberry (FG)	Gildernew (SF)	Mullooly (II)	MacManus (SF)	Blaney (FF)	Casey (Ind)	Tóibín (Aon)	Others
31 May 2024	Ireland Thinks/Sunday Independent	614	12.1	12.5	10.5	5.3	7	7.2	6.4	5.6	2.6	2.9	7.5	20.5
15 May 2024	Ipsos B&A/The Irish Times	500	11	10	10	9	9	8	7	6	4	4	4	17
7 May 2024	Ireland Thinks/Sunday Independent	631	10	9	10	6	9	8	8	7	2	4	6	21

==== South ====
Last date of polling	Polling firm / Commissioner	Sample size	Kelly (FG)	Kelleher (FF)	Funchion (SF)	Ní Mhurchú (FF)	Gavan (SF)	Hourigan (Lab)	McNamara (Ind)	Mullins (FG)	Blighe (IF)	O'Sullivan (GP)	Wallace (I4C)	Doyle (SD)	Others
31 May 2024	Ireland Thinks/Sunday Independent	660	18.5	14.4	9.5	4.6	5.7	3.6	9.9	4.2	4.3	6.2	4.7	3.3	10.5
15 May 2024	Ipsos B&A/The Irish Times	500	23	18	11	7	6	5	4	4	4	3	3	2	10
7 May 2024	Ireland Thinks/Sunday Independent	643	14	16	13	4	5	3	8	6	4	5	5	5	12

== Results ==
Party	Votes	%	+/–	Seats	+/–
Fine Gael	362,766	20.79	-8.81	4	-1
Fianna Fáil	356,794	20.44	+3.84	4	+2
Sinn Féin	194,403	11.14	-0.56	2	+1
Independent Ireland	108,685	6.23	New	1	New
Labour Party	58,975	3.38	+0.28	1	+1
Green Party	93,575	5.36	-6.04	0	-2
Independents 4 Change	79,658	4.56	-2.82	0	-2
Aontú	65,559	3.76	New	0	New
Social Democrats	51,571	2.95	+1.75	0	0
Ireland First	32,667	1.87	New	0	New
People Before Profit–Solidarity	31,802	1.82	-0.48	0	0
Irish Freedom Party	29,709	1.70	New	0	New
National Party	12,879	0.74	New	0	New
Rabharta	11,302	0.65	New	0	New
The Irish People	11,024	0.63	New	0	New
Independent	243,861	13.97	-1.73	2	+1
Total	1,745,230	100.00	–	14	+1
Valid votes	1,745,230	96.95			
Invalid/blank votes	54,996	3.05			
Total votes	1,800,226	100.00			
Registered voters/turnout	3,554,450	50.65			

=== MEPs elected ===
2024 European Parliament Ireland constituencies

Constituency	Name	Party	EP group
Dublin	Regina Doherty	Fine Gael	EPP
Dublin	Barry Andrews	Fianna Fáil	RE
Dublin	Lynn Boylan	Sinn Féin	The Left
Dublin	Aodhán Ó Ríordáin	Labour	S&D
Midlands–North-West	Luke 'Ming' Flanagan	Independent	The Left
Midlands–North-West	Barry Cowen	Fianna Fáil	RE
Midlands–North-West	Maria Walsh	Fine Gael	EPP
Midlands–North-West	Nina Carberry	Fine Gael	EPP
Midlands–North-West	Ciaran Mullooly	Independent Ireland	RE
South	Seán Kelly	Fine Gael	EPP
South	Billy Kelleher	Fianna Fáil	RE
South	Michael McNamara	Independent	RE
South	Cynthia Ní Mhurchú	Fianna Fáil	RE
South	Kathleen Funchion	Sinn Féin	The Left
Source: RTÉ News

The elected MEPs took office on 16 July. This left four vacancies in the Dáil and one vacancy in the Seanad. Another senator elected as an MEP had resigned her Seanad seat on 10 July, and was replaced by a nominee on the same day. A writ for by-elections for the vacancies in the Dáil must be moved within 6 months of that date.
