= Independent Ireland =

Irish political party

Independent Ireland Éire Neamhspleách
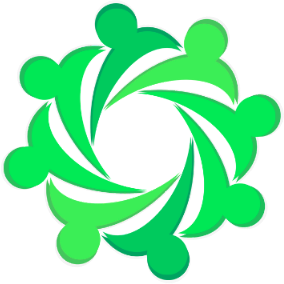
- Leader: Michael Collins
- General Secretary: Richard O'Donoghue
- Chairperson: Ken O'Flynn
- Founders: Michael Collins; Richard O'Donoghue
- Founded: 10 November 2023
- Ideology: Conservatism; Right-wing populism
- Political position: Right-wing
- European affiliation: European Democratic Party
- European Parliament group: Renew Europe
- Colours: Green
- Slogan: Forward Together
- Dáil Éireann: 4 / 174
- European Parliament: 1 / 14
- Local government: 27 / 949

Website
- independentireland.ie

Independent Ireland (Irish: Éire Neamhspleách) is a right-wing political party in Ireland. It was formed on 8 November 2023 by former independent TDs Michael Collins and Richard O'Donoghue. Their elected representation was subsequently boosted by the joining of TD Michael Fitzmaurice, formerly an independent, and by the success of Ciaran Mullooly in winning a seat for the party in the European Parliament in the 2024 elections.

Collins has said that the party seeks to provide "a comfortable alternative" to voters unhappy with Fianna Fáil and Fine Gael but unwilling to vote for Sinn Féin.

== History ==
Collins is the leader of the party in Dáil Éireann, while O'Donoghue serves as general secretary. Following the formation of the party in 2023, O'Donoghue told the Irish Examiner that he and Collins hoped to encourage members of the Rural Independents Group in the Dáil to join. Both Collins and O'Donoghue had been members of the Rural Independents Group prior to founding the party.

Michael Fitzmaurice became the party's third TD in February 2024. In the same month, Councillors Shane P. O'Reilly and Declan Geraghty joined the party and announced their intention to contest re-election to Cavan County Council and Galway County Council respectively. In March 2024, John O'Donoghue of Limerick City and County Council, Noel Larkin and Declan Kelly of Galway City Council, Kenneth O'Flynn of Cork City Council, and Nigel Dineen of Roscommon County Council all announced they would run for Independent Ireland in the 2024 local elections.

On 5 April 2024, the party announced that former RTÉ correspondent Ciaran Mullooly would be standing for Independent Ireland in the 2024 European Parliament election in the Midlands–North-West constituency. In the same month, Councillors Séamus Walsh and Noel Thomas of Galway County Council, Paul Hogan of Westmeath County Council, and Danny Collins of Cork County Council announced they would run for Independent Ireland in the 2024 local elections. On 22 April 2024, Ireland's Classic Hits Radio presenter Niall Boylan announced he would be running for the party in the 2024 European Parliament election in the Dublin constituency.

On 1 May 2024, the general secretary of the Irish Cattle and Sheep Farmers' Association (ICSA), Eddie Punch, who earlier in the year said that he would run as an independent candidate at the European election, announced he had joined Independent Ireland and would be running in the South constituency. Also in May 2024, John Cassin of Carlow County Council and Joe Bonner of Meath County Council announced they would run as Independent Ireland candidates in the 2024 local elections.

In the European election, Independent Ireland's three candidates received 108,685 first-preference votes, coming fourth behind Fianna Fáil, Fine Gael, and Sinn Féin. Ciaran Mullooly was elected in Midlands–North-West, with Niall Boylan coming fifth on the last count in the four-seat Dublin constituency. In the local elections, the party ranked seventh in first-preference votes, with 51,562 votes, and elected 23 of its 61 candidates. The party elected six councillors to Galway County Council and four councillors to Cork County Council, and became the third largest party on both councils. Of its thirteen incumbents, eleven were re-elected.

Ciaran Mullooly, Independent Ireland's sole member of the European Parliament, joined the liberal Renew Europe parliamentary group on 3 July. Mullooly identifies as a centrist and has distanced himself from the more hardline stances of some party colleagues. Independent Ireland had previously taken part in a December 2023 conference organised by the right-wing European Conservatives and Reformists (ECR). Mullooly's decision to join Renew, which includes Fianna Fáil, attracted significant criticism, with fellow candidate Niall Boylan stating he would have joined the ECR if elected, and conservative commentator John McGuirk arguing that it was a "betrayal" of voters' trust. On 7 July, party chairperson Elaine Mullally resigned her position, claiming Independent Ireland no longer aligned with her values. On 10 July, Independent Ireland put out a 2,500-word statement defending the decision, in which leader Michael Collins dismissed as "quite laughable" that, by joining Renew, the party would be "supporting silly stuff like men being allowed to use women's public toilets and that we would be advocating car-free streets".

In January 2025, Independent Ireland formed a technical group in the Dáil with Aontú.

== Ideology and policies ==
Independent Ireland has been widely described as right-wing by journalists and academics. Independent Ireland officeholders have often rejected the "right-wing" label, instead describing the party as "common sense". In a July 2024 statement, Independent Ireland characterised itself as "centre-right". The party has also been described as representing rural or farmers' interests. Independent Ireland has stated it does not operate a strict party whip system and allows its members freedom to speak and vote on key issues.

Both Independent Ireland and Aontú advocated for a No/No vote in the 2024 Irish constitutional referendums. The party's leader, Michael Collins, has said that he is "against abortion. Full stop." Collins and O'Donoghue were co-sponsors of a 2021 bill that would have required pain relief for foetuses being aborted. The Dáil overwhelmingly defeated the bill. Collins and O'Donoghue have both been alleged to have questioned the efficacy of vaccines against COVID-19, though both have since stated that they are not anti-vaccine and they have expressed a willingness to take a COVID-19 vaccine.

The party is critical of immigration and opposes "open borders", arguing that these are promoted by profiteers at the expense of the taxpayer. The party has pledged to enact planning reform, establish emergency modular housing schemes, and eradicate the issue of families living in emergency accommodations. It aims to reduce the cost of living by freezing and reforming the Carbon Tax. It also wishes to end the Property Tax and abolish the Universal Social Charge for people over the age of 65 to avoid taxation of pensions.

== Elected representatives ==
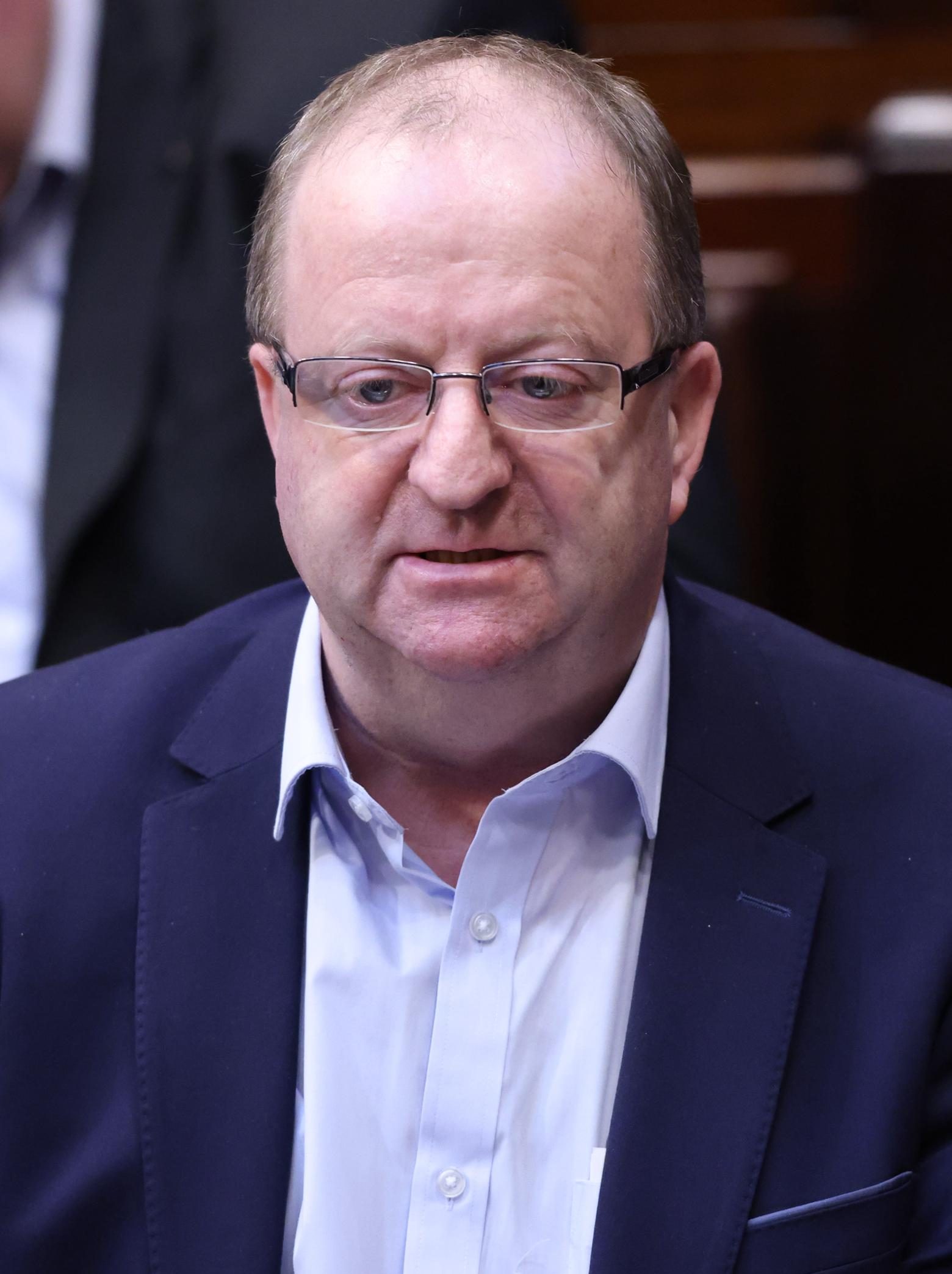
Michael Collins

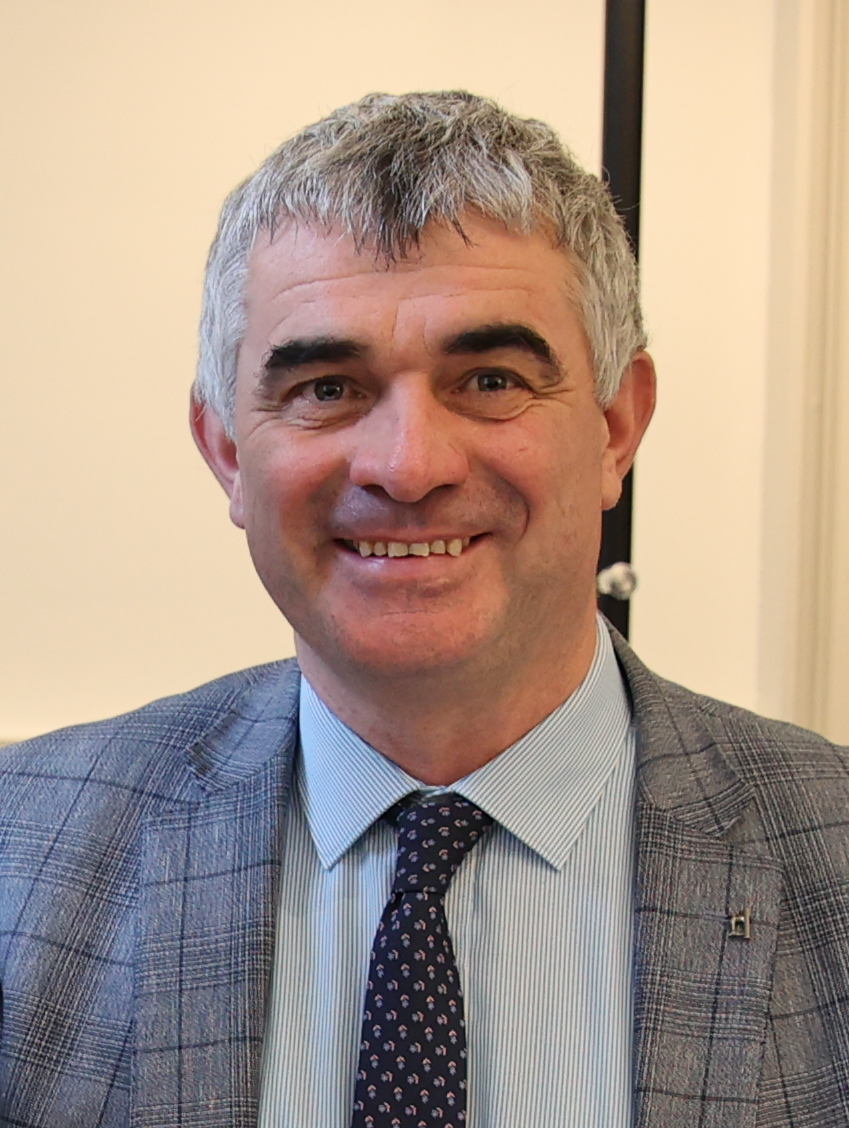
Richard O'Donoghue

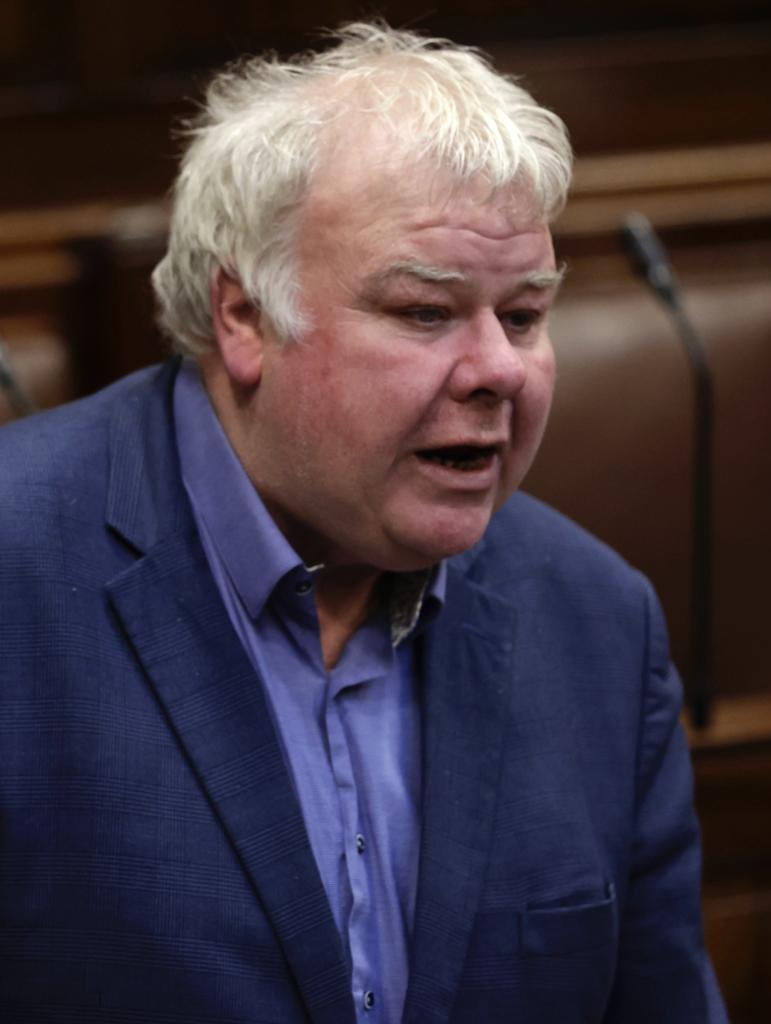
Michael Fitzmaurice

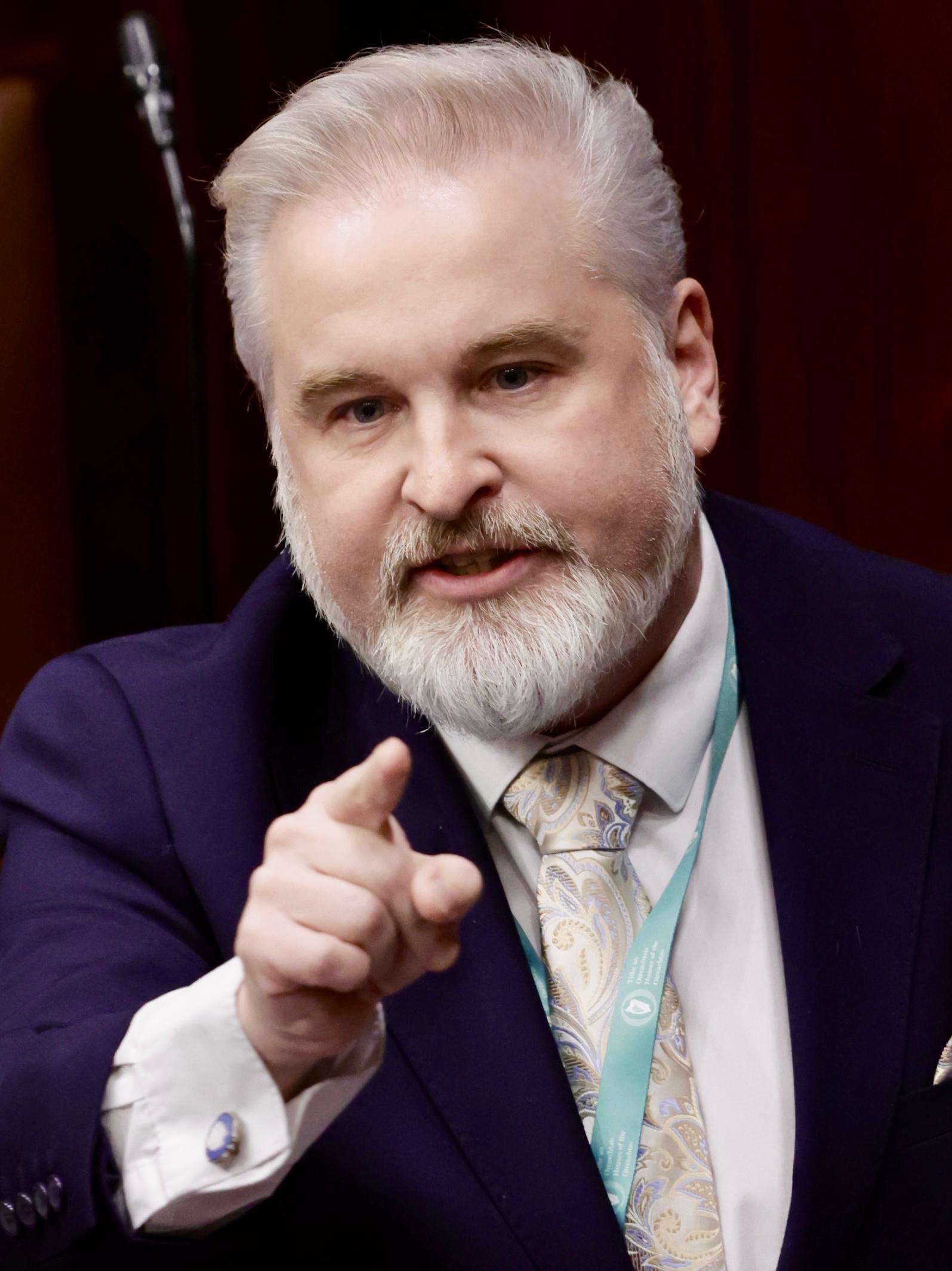
Ken O'Flynn

Independent Ireland's 4 TDs as of 2025

In the 33rd Dáil, the party had three TDs, all of whom were elected as independents but later switched to Independent Ireland. They were Richard O'Donoghue (Limerick County), Michael Collins (Cork South-West) and Michael Fitzmaurice (Roscommon–Galway). All three were re-elected in the 2024 general election, and they were joined by Kenneth O'Flynn, who was elected as an Independent Ireland TD for Cork North-Central.

The party has one member of the European Parliament, Ciaran Mullooly, who was elected at the 2024 European Parliament election to represent the Midlands–North-West constituency. Mullooly won the fifth and final seat in the constituency on the 21st count.

Independent Ireland contested its first local elections in 2024. Prior to those elections, the party had 13 councillors that had switched to Independent Ireland. Of those 13, eleven were re-elected and a further twelve were elected under the party name, for a total of 23 elected councillors. The party performed well in the elections to the Galway and Cork county councils, electing six and four councillors respectively, and becoming the third largest party on each council. In October 2024, it was announced that Sligo councillor, Michael Clarke, had joined the party.

On 23 November 2024, Councillor Philip Sutcliffe Snr quit Independent Ireland after controversy arose over Sutcliffe's association with Conor McGregor following McGregor being found liable for assault. Another issue was Sutcliffe's reported interest in meeting criminal Gerry "The Monk" Hutch. A general election candidate for Dublin South-Central, Sutcliffe faced criticism from party leadership, who deemed his actions and public statements inconsistent with their commitment to law and order. Richard O'Donoghue stated that Sutcliffe resigned before a second meeting with the party executive, where disciplinary measures were expected to be discussed. While acknowledging Sutcliffe's contributions to boxing, O'Donoghue emphasised that the party could not condone his connections. Sutcliffe has not provided public comment on the matter.

== Election results ==
=== Dáil Éireann ===
Election	Leader	FPv	%	Seats	%	±	Dáil	Government
2024	Michael Collins	78,276	3.6 (#7)	4 / 174	2.3 (#5)	▲1 (Note: Based on the results of the three returned TDs from the 2020 general election.)	34th	Opposition; 35th government (FF-FG-Ind majority)

=== Local elections ===
Election	Seats won	±	First pref. votes	%
2024	23 / 949	▲23	51,562	2.8%

=== European elections ===
Election	Leader	1st pref Votes	%	Seats	+/−
2024	Michael Collins	108,685	6.23% (#4)	1 / 14	New
