= Michael Collins (politician, born 1968) =

Irish politician, leader of Independent Ireland (born 1968)

Michael Collins TD
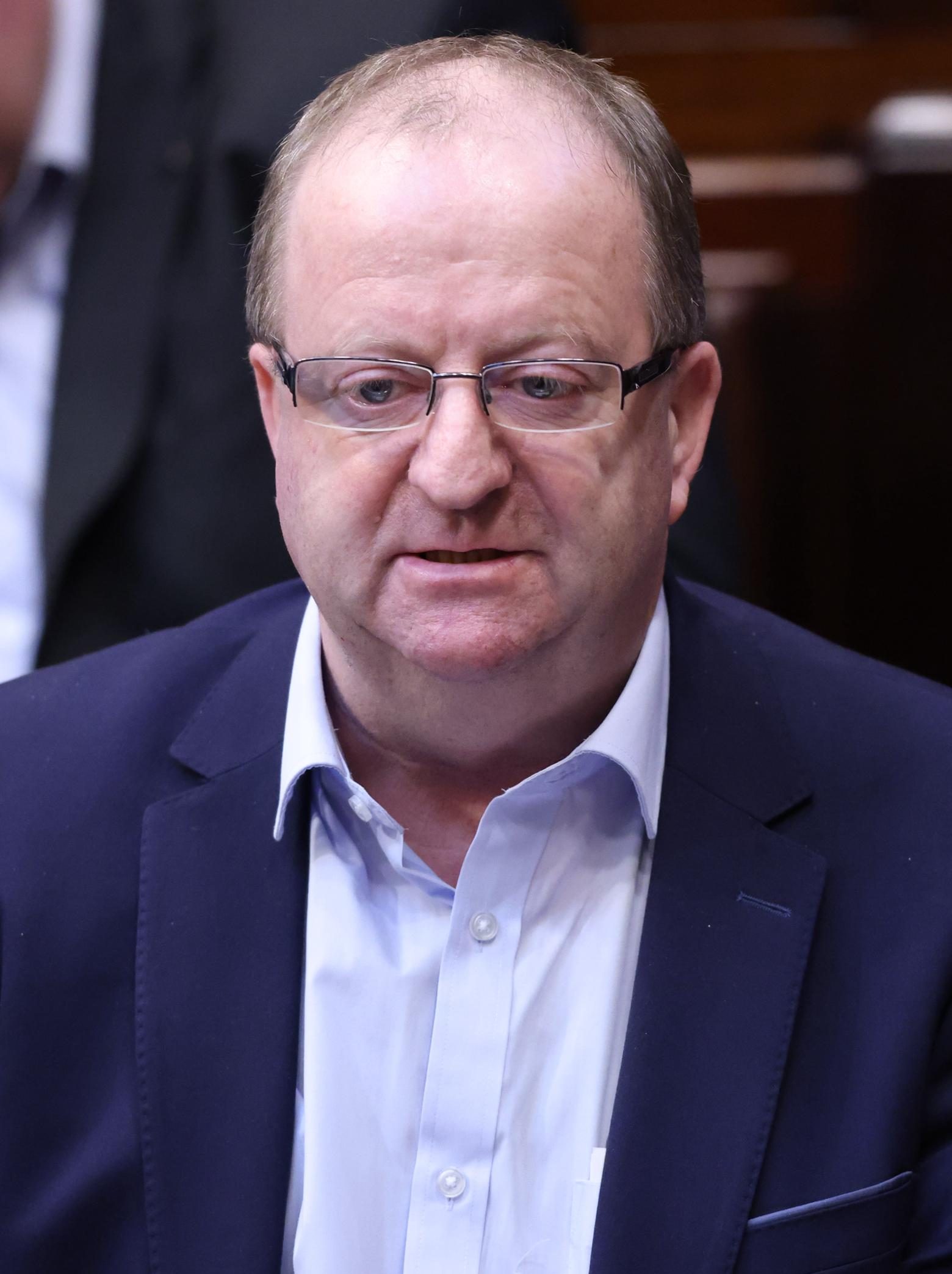
- Collins in 2025

Leader of Independent Ireland
- Incumbent
- Assumed office 10 November 2023
- Preceded by: New party

Teachta Dála
- Incumbent
- Assumed office February 2016
- Constituency: Cork South-West

Personal details
- Born: 1968 or 1969 (age 57–58) Cork, Ireland
- Party: Independent Ireland (since 2023)
- Other political affiliations: Independent (until 2023)

Michael Collins (born 26 February 1968) is an Irish politician who has been a Teachta Dála (TD) for the Cork South-West constituency since the 2016 general election. Collins is the leader of the Independent Ireland political party which he co-founded in November 2023.

== Political career ==
He served as a member of Cork County Council from 2014 to 2016.

In May 2018, the Irish Independent published a "political rich list", outlining how much personal wealth Ireland's political class was estimated to have. The report featured Collins and estimated him to be a millionaire, suggesting he had property assets worth almost €850,000 alone.

Collins was re-elected as an independent TD at the 2020 general election.

In December 2021 Collins was among a group of TDs who proposed a bill in the Dáil that would require pain relief for a foetus during later abortions. The bill was defeated by 107 votes to 36. The Minister of Health Stephen Donnelly stated it would not be appropriate for a piece of legislation to dictate clinical practice in a medical or a healthcare setting. Meanwhile, Collins' fellow Cork South-West TD Holly Cairns stated that the move was "upsetting for the women and families who have had later abortions and insulting to our healthcare practitioners" and suggested Collins and his group were determined to try and re-run and undermine the 2018 referendum on the Eighth amendment using American conservative style tactics.

In November 2023, he was named as the leader of Independent Ireland, a new political party.

At the 2024 general election, Collins was re-elected to the Dáil.

== Political views ==
In January 2018, in the run-up to the referendum on the 8th amendment of that May, Collins stated that he was "against abortion. Full stop."

In May 2021, while speaking in the Dáil, Collins suggested that a hotel chain being used by the government to quarantine those suspected of having COVID-19 was linked to Jeffrey Epstein.

In an April 2024 interview with Hot Press Collins stated he believes that prostitution should be legalised, that abortion should be permitted in extreme circumstances, that rapists should be chemically castrated, that third-time offenders should receive an automatic 25-year sentence, and that legally-held firearms should be permitted for self-defence. He also stated that asylum seekers should be held in "holding bays" like in Australia, that the burqa should be banned in schools and that Travellers should not be legally recognised as an ethnic minority.

== Controversies ==
In 2015, following his announcement that he intended to run in the 2016 general election, it emerged that, in 2013, Collins had provided a character reference for an acquaintance's son who was appearing in court and was later convicted of a child sex offence. Collins stated that he regretted the decision.

In September 2019, Collins defended anti-immigrant rhetoric used by fellow TD Noel Grealish, and in doing so claimed Ireland was "losing its culture" because of immigrants and suggested that Ireland should "look after our own people first and then when that issue is sorted, let's start looking at people from across the world". For that, both he and Grealish were criticised in Irish political circles, with Labour leader Brendan Howlin calling the pair "highly dangerous", and Irish President Michael D. Higgins, while not directly referring to them, publicly rejected their rhetoric, suggesting that it was not factual that immigrants were replacing people in Ireland, and that immigrants accounted for a high percentage of Ireland's GDP.

In February 2020, after the general election, Collins referred to Minister for Transport, Tourism and Sport Shane Ross as a "scumbag". In response, John Halligan said that Collins was a man "beneath contempt" and a hypocrite who claims not to make personal attacks but, in fact, does so repeatedly. Collins had previously referred to Ross as a "clown" in a separate incident and, upon learning that Ross had not been re-elected on the same night, he said he was happy to see Ross "on the scrapheap of Irish politics". Collins later apologised for his comments about Ross and denied being drunk when he made them.

In June 2020, during global protests over the murder of George Floyd, Collins was criticised, alongside Danny Healy-Rae, when both TDs used the slogan "All Lives Matter". Collins described the phrase as "his mantra" and said the phrase meant he valued everyone equally regardless of background. Shane Curry of the Irish Network Against Racism said he found it hard to believe that both Collins and Healy-Rae were naive about the meaning of the slogan and didn't know that many people use the phrase as a refutation of the Black Lives Matter Movement. During the same period, Collins rejected calls for statues and plaques commemorating historic figures involved in the transatlantic slave trade be removed.

While speaking on the Claire Byrne radio show on RTÉ in November 2020, Collins defended giving the roles of his parliamentary assistant and parliamentary secretary to his brother and his partner, respectively. Collins said he denied that this was a "jobs for the boys" situation.

In December 2020, Collins was one of only three TDs out of 160 to say he would not take a COVID-19 vaccine in a survey conducted by the Claire Byrne show. Collins stated he did not trust "professionals and companies who make money from the vaccine". In response to the comments, James O'Connor of Fianna Fáil criticised Collins in the Dáil, saying that it was "absolutely outrageous that we have members of this House who are willing to come in here and pander to the message of anti-vaxxers ...", and noted that, "the COVID-19 vaccine has seen more investment than any other vaccination in history". Following O'Connor's comments, Collins augmented his statement and declared he would be happy to take a vaccine "if it was proven to work".

In 2023, Collins objected strongly to then Minister of State at the Department of Agriculture, Food and the Marine, Pippa Hackett describing him as an organic farmer, claiming that she could only have got that information from her husband who worked as a farm inspector and had inspected Collins' farm. It later emerged that he had previously referred to himself as an organic farmer in the Dáil on several occasions.

| Dáil | Election | Deputy (Party) | Deputy (Party) | Deputy (Party) |
|---|---|---|---|---|
| 17th | 1961 | Seán Collins (FG) | Michael Pat Murphy (Lab) | Edward Cotter (FF) |
| 18th | 1965 | Seán Collins (FG) | Michael Pat Murphy (Lab) | Edward Cotter (FF) |
| 19th | 1969 | John O'Sullivan (FG) | Michael Pat Murphy (Lab) | Flor Crowley (FF) |
| 20th | 1973 | John O'Sullivan (FG) | Michael Pat Murphy (Lab) | Flor Crowley (FF) |
| 21st | 1977 | Jim O'Keeffe (FG) | Michael Pat Murphy (Lab) | Joe Walsh (FF) |
| 22nd | 1981 | Jim O'Keeffe (FG) | P. J. Sheehan (FG) | Flor Crowley (FF) |
| 23rd | 1982 (Feb) | Jim O'Keeffe (FG) | P. J. Sheehan (FG) | Joe Walsh (FF) |
| 24th | 1982 (Nov) | Jim O'Keeffe (FG) | P. J. Sheehan (FG) | Joe Walsh (FF) |
| 25th | 1987 | Jim O'Keeffe (FG) | P. J. Sheehan (FG) | Joe Walsh (FF) |
| 26th | 1989 | Jim O'Keeffe (FG) | P. J. Sheehan (FG) | Joe Walsh (FF) |
| 27th | 1992 | Jim O'Keeffe (FG) | P. J. Sheehan (FG) | Joe Walsh (FF) |
| 28th | 1997 | Jim O'Keeffe (FG) | P. J. Sheehan (FG) | Joe Walsh (FF) |
| 29th | 2002 | Jim O'Keeffe (FG) | Denis O'Donovan (FF) | Joe Walsh (FF) |
| 30th | 2007 | Jim O'Keeffe (FG) | P. J. Sheehan (FG) | Christy O'Sullivan (FF) |
| 31st | 2011 | Jim Daly (FG) | Noel Harrington (FG) | Michael McCarthy (Lab) |
| 32nd | 2016 | Jim Daly (FG) | Michael Collins (Ind.) | Margaret Murphy O'Mahony (FF) |
| 33rd | 2020 | Holly Cairns (SD) | Michael Collins (Ind.) | Christopher O'Sullivan (FF) |
| 34th | 2024 | Holly Cairns (SD) | Michael Collins (II) | Christopher O'Sullivan (FF) |
