= David McSavage =

Irish comedian and broadcaster

- Born: David Andrews; 5 February 1966 (age 60); Dublin, Ireland
- Employer: RTÉ
- Known for: The Savage Eye on RTÉ Two
- Children: 2
- Father: David Andrews
- Relatives: Barry Andrews (brother); Todd Andrews (grandfather); Niall Andrews (uncle); Chris Andrews (cousin); Ryan Tubridy (cousin)

David Andrews (born 5 February 1966), known professionally as David McSavage, is an Irish stand-up comedian, comedy writer and street performer, known for his television show The Savage Eye.

== Early life and family ==
Andrews is the son of Annette Andrews and David Andrews, who was a Fianna Fáil TD and Minister for Foreign Affairs. He is brother to Barry Andrews, Fianna Fáil MEP for the Dublin constituency, Sinead (who works for the charity organisation Goal), Clare and Mary. Former Fianna Fáil TD and MEP Niall Andrews was his uncle, while his cousins include Chris Andrews, former Sinn Féin TD for the constituency of Dublin Bay South, and Ryan Tubridy, Irish television and radio personality and former presenter of The Late Late Show on Ireland's national broadcaster RTÉ. His grandfather Todd Andrews was active with the Irish Republican Army during the Irish War of Independence and his grandmother Mary Coyle, was a prominent member of Cumann na mBan.

Andrews grew up in Blackrock, Dublin and he attended Willow Park School where he played the lead in plays and then Blackrock College where he was also involved in drama. After school, he took a short course in film and TV.

He spent time in the United States, and then taught English in Japan.

== Career ==
=== Comedy ===
Andrews appeared as a street performer in Amsterdam, Australia, and in Ireland, including Dublin's Temple Bar.

He has performed at national and international comedy festivals such as the Kilkenny Comedy Festival. He became widely known in Ireland for his street performance in Dublin city centre; his street act consists of improvised songs often predicated on sardonic speculations about those passing by.

He is best known for the IFTA-nominated 2009 The Savage Eye, a show consisting of a mixture of comedy sketches and satire. During its four-year run on RTE, The Savage Eye satirised Irish public figures and society. The programme outraged several individuals, and he contrasted himself against the “mimicry” of the impressionist Oliver Callan, stating that "his stuff is more tribute. Satire is more vicious than that."

In 2008, McSavage devised and featured in Headwreckers, an episode of Channel 4's Comedy Lab show. In 2014 he played a bishop in the film Calvary (2014 film), starring Brendan Gleeson and Chris O'Dowd. He played William Hall, the publisher of Charles Dickens, in the film The Man Who Invented Christmas (2017).

On his comedy style, the Irish Examiner wrote that “McSavage continues to operate outside the mainstream. He has a fearlessness — a knack for saying uncomfortable things — that is rare on the Irish comedy scene.”

=== Views ===
While discussing a comedy sketch on politicians, McSavage (Andrews) was critical of the public's perceived negative attitude towards politicians. He claimed that "for a real leader to emerge he would have to do and say things that are difficult. People see politicians even getting, say, a salary and think, they're bastards, just for getting paid. The politician is us. It's who we are. We get the politicians we deserve." In 2020, he claimed that "the kind of person who wants to be a politician shouldn't be a politician".

In 2014, he accused RTE of "dictatorial censorship" for refusing to broadcast a sketch entitled 'Wild Nuns'. He said that “these things are important. Ultimately you are talking about freedom of speech and who says where the line is. I would be pissed off on somebody else’s behalf if it happened to them.” In a 2019 Newstalk radio interview, he agreed with sentiments that Irish comedy had become “too PC.” In a 2021 radio interview, he agreed with the opinion of UK comedian Leo Kearse that “cancel culture is a threat to comedy.” Kearse had previously complained about ‘cancel culture’ after saying that he had had shows disrupted by left-wing protesters and that promoters had blacklisted him for his offensive jokes. In 2020, speaking to the Business Post on the aspect of offence in relation to the content of his material, he said that “the offence thing is funny, because I realised recently that nothing needs to be done. It’s a self-contained, little thing.” In 2021, he named ‘cancel culture’ as a negative aspect to social media, which he believed was changing the nature of stand up.

== Personal life ==
McSavage met his future wife, Hannah Gnat from Poland, in Amsterdam, and they settled in Copenhagen for the birth of the first of two sons, and stayed there for 5 years. They subsequently moved to Australia, where their second son was born, and later still, in 2001, to Ireland. They divorced after 17 years. In 2023, McSavage mentioned that he and his ex-wife were producing a podcast together.

McSavage was long-term partner to TV actress Fiona O’Shaughnessy until October 2012. He appeared alongside O’Shaughnessy in John Michael McDonagh's 2022 film The Forgiven.

During the 1986 Edinburgh Festival, he was arrested for profanity but the charges were subsequently dismissed in court, following his argument that the word "war" was more profane than "penis".

In April 2016, McSavage was in court for not paying for a TV licence and argued in his defence that he had genuine concerns of how, the national broadcaster, RTE spends the taxpayers money. The judge rejected his argument and gave him the option of paying the outstanding arrears of €115 owed on his TV licence by June or facing a conviction and fine. McSavage failed to pay the arrears on time and was subsequently convicted and fined €125 (out of a possible €1,000 fine for a first offence) for failure to provide an up-to-date fully-paid TV licence and €50 for legal costs.

McSavage in 2017 and 2018 described his difficulties overcoming addiction to alcohol and paying his rent due to unemployment.

He spent a period of time cat-sitting in the Camberwell area of London during the COVID-19 pandemic.

== Awards ==
- IFTA nomination 2010, Best Entertainment Series
