= Institute of International and European Affairs =

Irish EU think tank

The Institute of International & European Affairs
- Abbreviation: IIEA
- Predecessor: Institute of European Affairs (IEA) 1991–2007
- Formation: 1991
- Founder: Brendan Halligan
- Founded at: Dublin, Ireland
- Type: NGO
- Registration no.: RCN 20024819
- Legal status: Registered Irish Charity
- Purpose: Impact of the EU on Ireland
- Headquarters: North Great George's Street, Dublin, Ireland
- Chairman: Feargal O'Rourke
- Director General: Alex White
- Revenue: €1,120,714 (2016)
- Website: IIEA

The Institute of International and European Affairs (IIEA; Irish: An Institiúid Gnóthaí Idirnáisiúnta agus Eorpacha) is an Irish policy think tank focusing on European and international policy trends based in Dublin, Ireland. It is known for its seminars and speaking events which attract notable international figures.

== History ==
The IIEA was founded as the Institute of European affairs in 1991. According to Tony Brown, author of a history of the IIEA, it was established to promote informed debate on European affairs in the wake of the Crotty Judgement and the subsequent Irish referendum on the Single European Act, which he argues was marked by low turnout for the time and limited and low-quality debate. The institute was officially launched in April 1991 by Minister for Foreign Affairs Gerry Collins. Brendan Halligan was head of the organising committee and its first chairman. Mary Robinson, then President of Ireland, was appointed as its patron.

A June 1996 Irish Times article notes that the Institute of European Affairs (IEA) was set up in 1989 by Brendan Halligan, the former General Secretary of the Irish Labour Party, and that much of the financial backing came from Irish semi–state bodies, including those on which Halligan was a board member. The article also notes that the IEA rented a house on 8 North Great George's Street of which Halligan was a part owner. Tony Brown writes that Brendan Halligan and founding member Niall Greene purchased 8 North Great Georges street with their own money in trust for the use of the institute with the option to purchase the premises at the lower of cost or market value when it had secured the funds to do so. The IIEA finally purchased the building in 1998, noting "a debt of gratitude to Brendan Halligan and Niall Greene" for this support in that year's Annual Report. Brigid Laffan also states that Halligan and Greene purchased the premises in trust for the IIEA.

The institute's research programme was initially led by Professor Patrick Keatinge of Trinity College Dublin who was the first senior staff appointee as Senior Research Fellow. In 1991 and 1992, the institute produced ten publications including on Economic and Monetary Union and Irish public opinion on Irish neutrality. Early authors included as James Dooge, Miriam Hederman O'Brien, Brigid Laffan and Trinity College Dublin Professor Michael Marsh. Keatinge's term was followed by Brian Farrell as the institute's first Director General from 1994 to 1996.

Farrell was succeeded in 1996 by Terry Stewart, a former director of the European Commission Representation in Dublin. Stewart held this position until 1999. The next Director General was Joe Brosnan, who held this position from 1999 to 2002. Brosnan was a former Secretary General of the Department of Justice and had been Chef de Cabinet of Pádraig Flynn in the European Commission.

The former leader of Fine Gael, Alan Dukes was appointed as the Director General of the IEA in December 2002. a post he held until December 2007. In July 2007, the IEA changed its name to the Institute of International and European Affairs (IIEA), Jill Donohughe, previously Director of Research, was the first female Director General of the IIEA from 2008 to 2010.

Former Irish Ambassador to the UN Daithí Ó Ceallaigh was Director General of the IIEA from 2010 to 2013. O'Ceallaigh had been Irish ambassador to the UN from 2007 to 2009 and was previously Irish ambassador to the United Kingdom (2001–2007). In August 2013, Tom Arnold, previously CEO of Concern Worldwide, was appointed Director General of the IIEA. In March 2017, Barry Andrews, former CEO of GOAL and Irish Minister of State for Children, was appointed Director General. At the same time as the appointment of Barry Andrews, Halligan, then 81 years of age, stepped down as chairperson to become President of the IIEA. Ruairi Quinn, former leader of the Labour Party, became the new Chairperson of the IIEA.

In January 2019 Barry Andrews stepped down as Director General temporarily to run in the European Parliament election and resigned after his election as an MEP. He was succeeded as Acting Director General by Donal de Buitléir, Chairman of the Low Pay Commission. Michael Collins, previously Irish Ambassador to Germany, was appointed Director General in November 2019. In April 2022, David O'Sullivan, former Secretary-General of the European Commission, became the new Director General of the IIEA. David O’Sullivan resigned in January 2023 to take on the role of International Special Envoy for the Implementation of EU Sanctions. Alex White, Senior Counsel, former Senator, TD and Government Minister, was appointed to the role of Director-General in January 2023.

== Activities ==
=== Research ===
The IIEA's public accounts state that the principal activity of the IIEA is to: "promote the research of International and European political, economic, cultural, societal and legal institutions, proceedings and relations". IIEA research is sometimes used in Oireachtas reports. IIEA research is often covered in the media. Recent coverage includes reviews by the Financial Times and the Irish Times of the IIEA book "Britain and Europe: The Endgame. An Irish Perspective", an interview with IIEA Chief Economist Dan O'Brien on Apple and state aid and coverage on research by Professor Frank Barry on the implications of a change in the US corporation tax system for Ireland.

=== Seminars ===
The IIEA was described by the Irish Times in 2007 as a "a policy research think-tank and forum", with the most notable activities of the IIEA being the quantum of speaking events on mostly European issues, hosted over the years. In 2015, the IIEA hosted 120 seminars with speakers such as Jean Claude Trichet and Pierre Moscovici. In 2014, the IIEA hosted 140 seminars with speakers such as Peter Sutherland and Martin Wolf. In 2013, the year of Ireland's EU Presidency, the IIEA hosted 170 seminars with speakers such as Christine Lagarde.

== Structure ==
=== Legal status ===
The IIEA's public accounts (Company Number 171807) state it is a company limited by guarantee which does not have share capital. The IIEA pays no taxes as it is an Irish Registered Charity (RCN 20024889).

=== Funding structure ===
As of November 2018, the IIEA's most recent filed accounts for the 2016 financial year state that the IIEA's Income of €1,120,714 million separates into four categories (see § Accounts):

1. Subscriptions (56%). Annual membership fees, which were listed at €10,000 per annum. The IIEA's accounts show that such fees are paid by various Irish State Departments (e.g. Department of Defense, Department of Agriculture), Irish semi–state companies (e.g. ESB, Enterprise Ireland, the DAA), and Irish private companies (e.g. AIB, Bank of Ireland);
2. Grants (16%). There are mostly Irish State grants;
3. Other (12%). This item is not explained in any form of the IIEA § Accounts, but rose sharply from 2009 onwards;
4. CE–Scheme (16%). This is the Irish "Community Employment Scheme" where the Irish State pays for the wages of low–income employees hired by the organisation.

CE–Scheme and grants are Irish State sourced (32% of IIEA income); however, it is believed a material portion of the Subscription (and potentially Other category), are sourced from the Irish State (either directly from State departments, or via State–owned companies), and thus over 50% of IIEA income is funded by the Irish exchequer.

=== Governance ===
As of November 2025, the Director General and IIEA staff are overseen by a Board of 11 Directors (in alphabetical order):

- Maeve Carton Δ
- Brian Daly
- Declan Kelleher
- Sinéad McSweeney
- Sheila Nunan
- Feargal O’Rourke †
- Nora Owen
- Michael Patten
- Dr Orlaigh Quinn
- Marie Sinnott ‡
- Leo Varadkar

(†) Chairperson (‡) Secretary (Δ) Treasurer

=== Honorary positions ===
As of December 2024, the IIEA also listed a number of "Honorary Positions":

- Fellows: Tony Brown, Pat Cox, Marie Cross, Paul Gallagher, Eamon Gilmore, Katherine Meenan, Pádraig Murphy
- Comité d’Honneur: Enda Kenny, David Byrne, Brian Cowen, Pat Cox, Ray MacSharry, Charles McCreevy, Mary Robinson, Mary McAleese, Bertie Ahern and Máire Geoghegan-Quinn
- Honorary Life Members: Adrian Burke, Professor Patrick Keatinge, Dr Con Power, Dr David Williamson and Geraldine Byrne Nason

== Controversies ==
=== Brexit Hub ===
In January 2018, the Irish Times reported that the IIEA had asked the Department of Foreign Affairs in 2017 for €250,000 per annum to set up a new "Brexit Hub" office in Merrion Square to "act as a forum for sharing well-informed discussion on Brexit strategies". This request was declined on the basis of value for money. The proposed grant was to pay for new offices closer to Government Buildings and to also cover some of the €119,000 salary of the Director General Barry Andrews, and a new Brexit Hub Director, Donal de Buitléir.

== Accounts ==
IIEA published abridged accounts from 2009 to 2015 on their website. The Irish Charities Regulator website holds copies of the full IIEA accounts that are filed with the Companies Registration Office ("CRO"), for 2014, 2015 and 2016, which contain additional detail, particularly around the CE–Scheme, and the IIEA offices at 8 North Great George's Street.

Published accounts of the IIEA (2007–2016)
Euro	Calendar	2016	2015	2014	2013	2012	2011	2010	2009	2008	2007
Profit and Loss	Subscriptions (Note: Annual subscriptions from private individuals, government departments, semi-state companies, and private companies. The cost of corporate membership rose from £IEP1,000 in the 1990s, to €6,000 in the 2000s, and is currently quoted on the IIEA website as being €10,000 per annum.)	624,518	505,008	477,232	506,059	484,870	548,755	544,592	568,384	605,401	591,451
Profit and Loss	Grants (Note: Grants from the Irish State for various projects. For example, in 2017 the Department of Foreign Affairs funded a three-year €125,000 per annum programme with the IIEA on the future of the EU without the United Kingdom.)	183,752	212,155	143,758	274,217	155,255	295,133	298,806	406,998	91,166	6,492
Profit and Loss	Other (Note: This line item is not explained in the IIEA accounts; it seems to have increased materially during and after the Irish financial crisis.)	134,263	164,431	99,749	175,674	138,987	153,290	129,392	34,429	66,893	62,607
Profit and Loss	CE–Scheme (Note: The "Community Employment Scheme" whereby the Irish State pays the wages of low–income employment in the IIEA (mostly catering staff for the IIEA functions); this source of Income is matched by the CE–Scheme expenditure (e.g. the wages of the staff), under Costs and is only broken out in the full CRO accounts as filed with the Charities Regulator. The CE Scheme is paid for by the Department of Social Welfate and Protection.)	178,181	187,537	197,810	179,404	? (Note: The IIEA's filed accounts for years before 2013 are not freely available on the Charities Regulator website, it is therefore not possible to see the quantum of the CE–Scheme for earlier years.)	?	?	?	?	?
Profit and Loss	Total Income	1,120,714	1,069,131	918,549	1,135,354	779,112	997,178	972,790	1,009,811	763,460	660,550
Profit and Loss	Total Costs	1,101,834	1,073,676	1,073,578	1,136,412	799,842	993,697	972,390	1,033,779	837,958	661,973
Profit and Loss	Surplus/Deficit	18,880	−4,545	−155,029	−1,058	−20,730	3,481	400	−23,968	−74,498	−1,423
.											
Balance Sheet	Property	422,108	420,845	436,439	451,996	460,435	468,030	478,654	502,265	520,743	525,014
Balance Sheet	Liabilities	−166,137	−183,754	−194,802	−26,331	−29,501	−5,048	−6,976	−7,256	−5,850	69,061
Balance Sheet	Net Assets	255,971	237,091	241,637	425,665	430,934	462,982	471,678	495,009	514,893	594,075

== Selected books ==
- Brown, Tony (2016). Vision and Reality: A History of 25 Years of the Institute of International and European Affairs. Dublin: The Institute of International and European Affairs. ISBN 9781907079221.
- O'Ceallaigh, Dáithí; Gillespie, Paul, eds. (2015). Britain and Europe: The Endgame: an Irish Perspective (PDF). Institute of International and European Affairs. ISBN 978-1-907079-20-7. Archived from the original (PDF) on 8 November 2020.
- Keatinge, Patrick, ed. (1991). Political Union. Dublin: Institute of European Affairs. ISBN 1874109001.
- O'Donnell, Rory; O'Coafaigh, Tomás, eds. (1991). Economic and Monetary Union. Dublin: Institute of European Affairs. ISBN 187410901X.

== See also ==
- Economic and Social Research Institute, Ireland's main think tank on economics and social policy
- Irish Fiscal Advisory Council, Irish independent statutory budgetary advisor
- National Economic and Social Council, independent body that advises the Taoiseach on areas of policy relating to social and economic development
