= European Public Information Centre =

EU public space in Dublin, Ireland

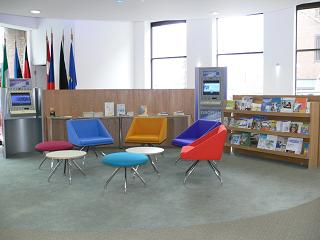
European Public Information Centre, European Union House, 18 Dawson Street, Dublin 2

The European Public Information Centre (EPIC) is a public space in Dublin, Ireland that provides free information and resources on European Union policies and their relevance to Ireland. It is located in the offices of the European Commission Representation in Ireland on the ground floor of European Union House at 18 Dawson Street, Dublin 2 and is open to the public from 9 a.m. to 5 p.m. Monday to Friday.

The EPIC provides free information leaflets and publications geared towards all age groups on the history and development of the EU, the EU institutions and how they work, and EU policy and legislation in different areas. A number of publications are available in Irish. Other resources include the most recent Eurobarometer, Internet points and multimedia facilities. Information officers are available to answer specific inquiries.

School visits to the EPIC are organised by the Information and Communications staff. These involve presentations and video screenings that actively encourage student participation. Teachers may request presentations about specific EU topics that are important to young people. Information guides specifically geared towards young people are also available.

EPIC also hosts a number of conferences, meetings, exhibitions, and cultural events throughout the year. Events held in 2009 include:

- "A glimpse of Germany" 20 years after the fall of the Berlin Wall: a photography exhibition presenting post-communist Germany as a tourist destination
- "In conversation with": a series of public meetings with contemporary Polish writers organised in co-operation with the Polish Embassy in Ireland. Speakers to date include Pawel Huwelle, author of Mercedes Benz and Castorp.
- In co-operation with the Embassy of the Kingdom of Lesotho in Ireland and Twinning the Kingdoms Waterville Friends of Lesotho, an exhibition of tapestries woven by women from Lesotho based on images donated by County Kerry artists.
