= Mary Banotti =

Irish politician (1939–2024)

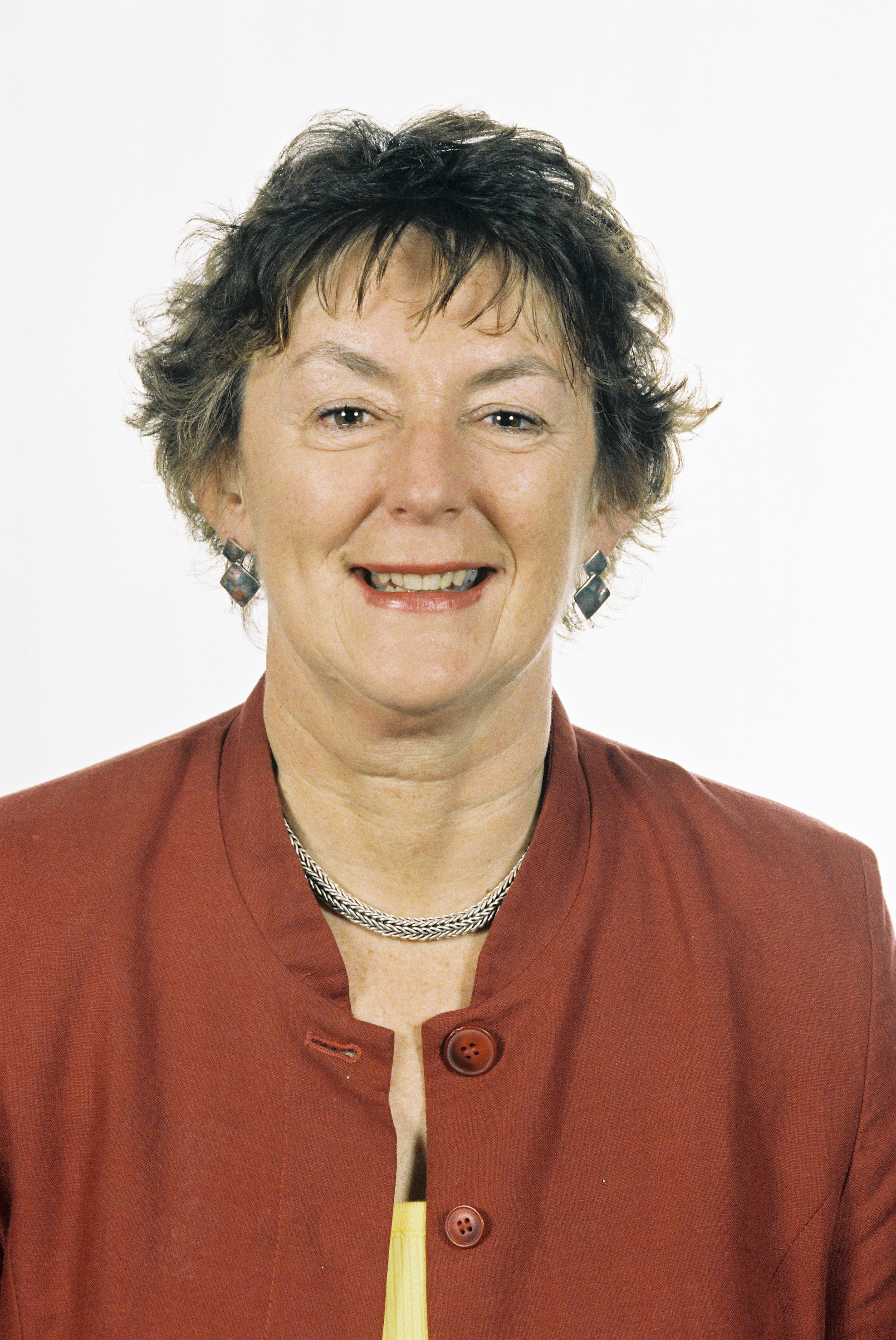
- Banotti in 2003

Member of the European Parliament
- In office 1 July 1984 – 24 May 2004
- Constituency: Dublin

Personal details
- Born: Mary Elizabeth O'Mahony; 29 May 1939 Malahide, Dublin, Ireland
- Died: 10 May 2024 (aged 84) Dublin, Ireland
- Party: Fine Gael
- Spouse: Fabio Bannotti (m. 1967; div. 1987)
- Children: 1
- Relatives: Nora Owen (sister); Michael Collins (grand-uncle)
- Education: Dublin City University
- Board member of: International Centre for Missing & Exploited Children (ICMEC); Vice Chair

Mary Elizabeth Banotti (née O'Mahony; 29 May 1939 – 10 May 2024) was an Irish Fine Gael politician who served as a Member of the European Parliament (MEP) for the Dublin constituency from 1984 to 2004.

== Early life and education ==
Banotti was born in Malahide, Dublin, in 1939 to Jim and Kitty O'Mahony. She was a sister of the former Minister Nora Owen and her mother was a niece of the Irish political leader Michael Collins. Living on Seafield Road, Clontarf, she attended a private primary school run by the Misses Walsh, and then the local Holy Faith Secondary School, Clontarf.

== Career ==
Following her education she worked as a nurse in North America, Europe and Africa, before joining Irish Distillers as an occupational health nurse and Industrial Welfare Officer in 1972.

Banotti was divorced for many years from her Italian husband.

Between 1980 and 1984, she presented a weekly programme on social welfare rights and information on RTÉ television. Banotti unsuccessfully contested the 1983 Seanad election and the Dublin Central by-election the same year.

=== Politics ===
In 1984, she was elected to the European Parliament, representing the Dublin constituency. She retained her seat until her retirement at the 2004 European elections. She was Fine Gael's candidate in the 1997 presidential election, coming second to Fianna Fáil's Mary McAleese. In 1999, she also was the UNFPA's Goodwill Ambassador on reproductive health.

== Philanthropy ==
Banotti was a member and Vice Chair of the Board of Directors of the International Centre for Missing & Exploited Children (ICMEC), a global nonprofit organization that combats child sexual exploitation, child pornography, and child abduction.

Banotti served as Honorary President of Health First Europe, and a member of the International Foundation for Electoral Systems' board.

Banotti died on 10 May 2024, at the age of 84. She was survived by her daughter, Tania.
