= Niall Andrews =

Irish politician (1937–2006)

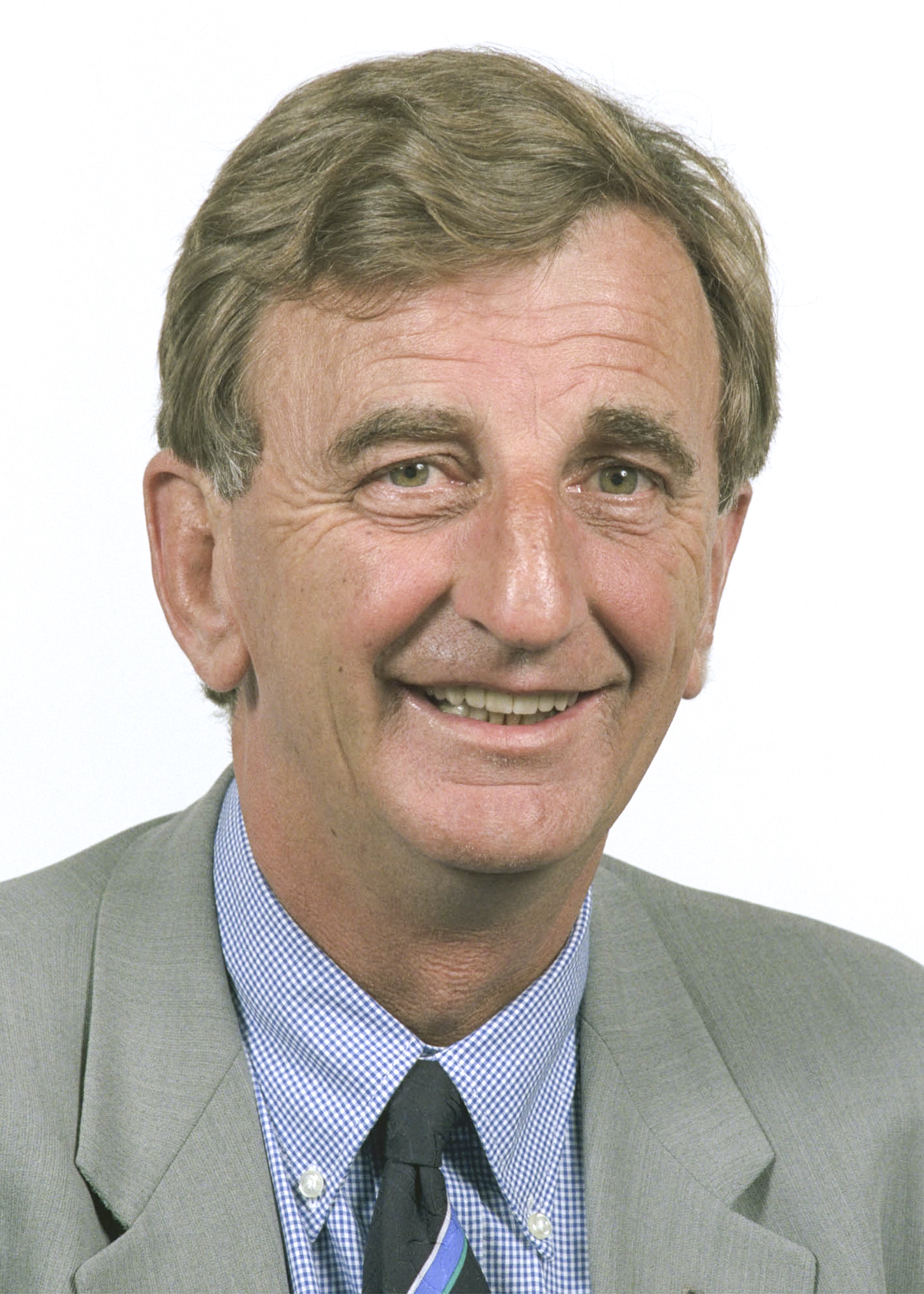
- Andrews in 1994

Member of the European Parliament
- In office 1 July 1984 – 24 May 2004
- Constituency: Dublin

Minister of State
- Oct.–Dec. 1982: Environment

Teachta Dála
- In office June 1981 – February 1987
- Constituency: Dublin South
- In office June 1977 – June 1981
- Constituency: Dublin County South

Personal details
- Born: 19 August 1937 Dublin, Ireland
- Died: 16 October 2006 (aged 69) Dublin, Ireland
- Party: Fianna Fáil
- Spouse: Bernadette Andrews
- Children: 3, including Chris
- Parent: Todd Andrews (father)
- Relatives: David Andrews (brother); Barry Andrews (nephew); David McSavage (nephew); Ryan Tubridy (nephew)
- Education: Synge Street CBS; Presentation College, Bray

Niall Dermot Andrews (19 August 1937 – 16 October 2006) was an Irish politician. He served as a Teachta Dála (TD) and Member of the European Parliament (MEP) for the Fianna Fáil party.

== Early life ==
Andrews was born in Dublin. He was educated at Synge Street CBS and Presentation College, Bray. Andrews came from a very ardent republican family. His father, Todd Andrews, served in the War of Independence and the Irish Civil War for the anti-treaty side. Todd Andrews was also a founder-member of Fianna Fáil in 1926. Niall Andrews's mother, Mary Coyle, was a prominent member of Cumann na mBan.

Andrews initially worked as a journalist for the Irish Press, a newspaper highly aligned with Fianna Fáil. After emigrating to the United States in 1953, Andrews worked in television journalism, served as a US Army stenographer during the Korean War, and met his wife, Bernadette, in New York. Returning to Ireland, he joined RTÉ in 1961 as a presentation officer and later became a programme executive.

== Political career ==
Andrews was first elected to Dáil Éireann at the 1977 general election for the Dublin County South constituency and later for the Dublin South constituency. He held his seat at each subsequent election until he decided not to contest the 1987 general election.

Both Andrews brothers backed George Colley in the 1979 Fianna Fáil leadership election. While David remained a staunch opponent of Charles Haughey and supported the leadership challenges against him in the early 1980s, Niall emerged as one of Haughey's most ardent allies. He believed Haughey was not only more capable than his rivals but also uniquely equipped to address Ireland's pressing economic and social challenges, a view reinforced by Haughey's strong republican stance. Todd Andrews, their father, was similarly an enthusiastic supporter of Haughey.

During a 1983 leadership challenge, Niall Andrews led a pro-Haughey demonstration outside Fianna Fáil headquarters on Mount Street, Dublin, accusing the media of attempting to execute Haughey in a manner akin to the executions of the 1916 leaders. He was photographed near a placard reading "Don't Forget The Crown Of Thorns." These dramatic displays, coupled with his flamboyant wardrobe, cemented his reputation as an unpredictable maverick. However, his status as a political "character" also bolstered his appeal among Dublin voters.

Andrews was Minister of State at the Department of the Environment with responsibility for Urban Renewal from October to December 1982.

Andrews was elected to the European Parliament in 1984 for the Dublin constituency and decided to concentrate on European politics instead of domestic. As an MEP, Niall Andrews remained committed to the causes he championed as a TD, notably confronting British Conservative MEPs over the use of potentially deadly plastic bullets for riot control in Northern Ireland. At one stage, he publicly suggested that Fianna Fáil sever ties with the French Gaullists, their main allies in the European Democratic Alliance, deeming them too right-wing. However, he was swiftly pressured to retract the comment. Much of Andrews' focus in the European Parliament centred on his work with the Cooperation and Development Committee, where he was a persistent advocate for increased aid to developing countries. He argued that Europe bore a moral obligation to assist nations that had often suffered under colonial rule. A particular passion of his was improving access to primary education in Africa, and he even sought to persuade Charles Haughey to visit the continent to witness its challenges firsthand, though without success.

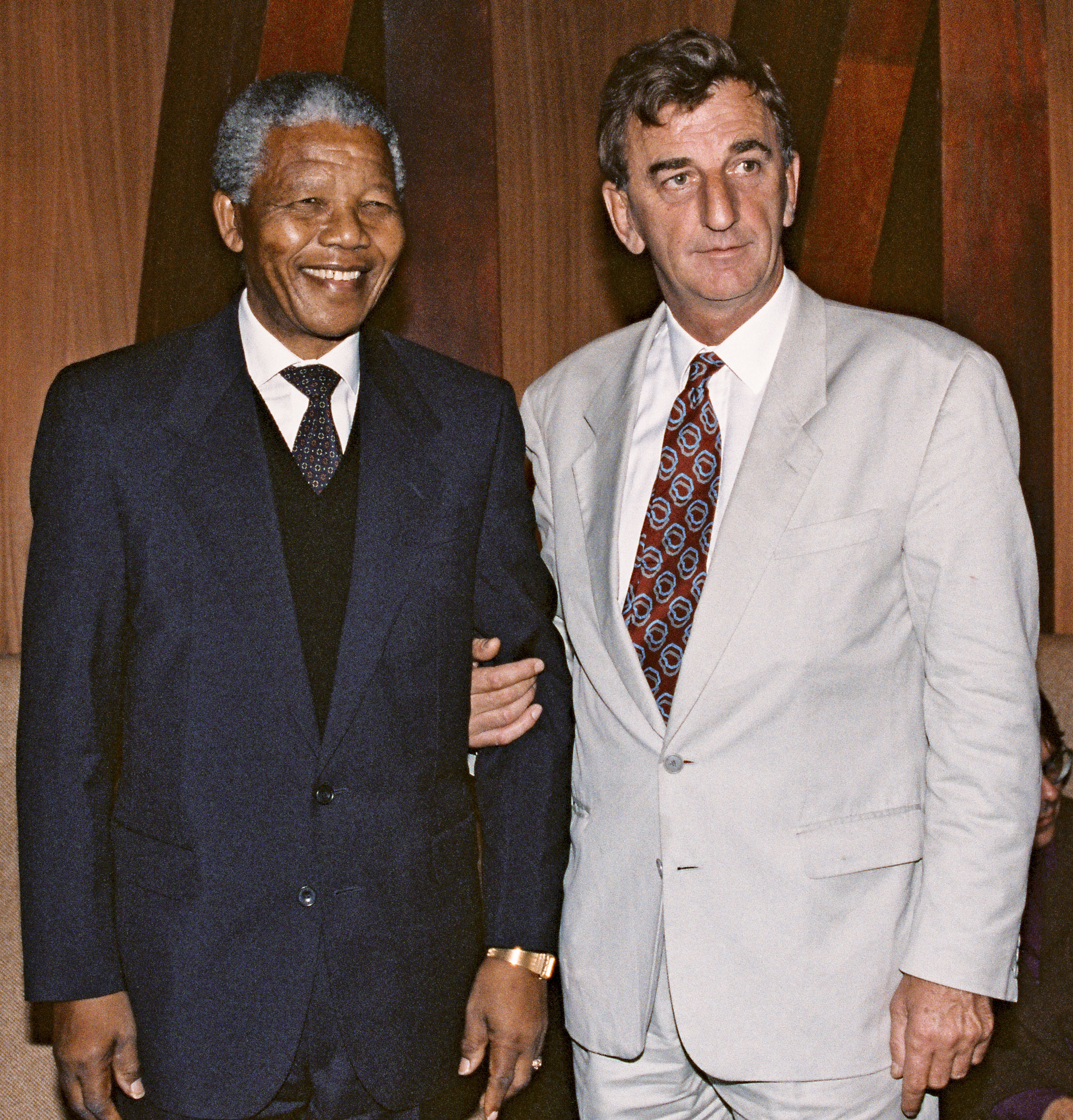
Andrews alongside Nelson Mandela in June 1990 as Mandela was awarded the 1988 Sakharov Prize, 4 months after Mandela released from prison after 27 years.

In a September 1986 interview with Hot Press, Niall Andrews expressed controversial views, advocating for a clearer separation of church and state and proposing the legalisation of brothels on "hygienic" grounds, though he emphasised his personal disdain for prostitution. This provoked a sharp rebuttal from feminist journalist Nell McCafferty in her Irish Press column, where she detailed the exploitation and abuse of women in brothels linked to American military bases. She went further, insinuating that Andrews, as a former member of the US armed forces, had participated in such practices and referred to him as "a connoisseur of red-light districts." Andrews initiated a libel action against the Irish Press, and in June 1989, the case was settled out of court. The newspaper issued no admission of liability but agreed to pay undisclosed damages and cover Andrews’ legal expenses.

== Political views ==
Both Niall and his brother David Andrews were known for their liberal social stances within Fianna Fáil. Andrews opposed capital punishment, supported contraception and the decriminalisation of homosexuality, but adhered to Fianna Fáil party positions in Dáil votes. Economically, he criticised monetarism. Andrews criticised the Irish justice system, contending that judges were disconnected from the realities faced by working-class defendants and lacked awareness of prison conditions. He also described traditional court practices, such as the wearing of wigs, as outdated and intimidating.

Andrews was an outspoken critic of US foreign policy, especially during Ronald Reagan’s presidency. He denounced American actions in Latin America, protested outside the US embassy in Dublin, and undertook a fact-finding mission to El Salvador. In Northern Ireland, he condemned both IRA violence and the justice system's "institutionalised violence," opposed the Anglo-Irish Agreement, and advocated a pluralist republic to reconcile with Unionists. He was among the first to champion the causes of the Birmingham Six and Guildford Four.

Andrews remained critical of US foreign policy following the Cold War. He utilised his contacts in the Middle East to assist in securing the release of Western hostages held in Lebanon, including Brian Keenan and John McCarthy. He opposed the economic sanctions on Iraq implemented after the 1991 Gulf War, arguing they caused significant harm to civilians and deepened divisions in the region. Andrews frequently visited Iraq, organised humanitarian aid shipments, and opposed the 2003 invasion of Iraq.

At the time of his death, he was involved in efforts to secure the release of the Miami Five: Cuban intelligence agents convicted of espionage in the United States in 2001. He also took an interest in the case of the Colombia Three; Irish republicans arrested in Colombia in 2001 and accused of assisting the FARC, a designated narco-terrorist organisation.

== Personal life ==
Andrews' brother David Andrews is a former TD and Minister for Foreign Affairs. His son, Chris Andrews, served as Fianna Fáil TD for Dublin South-East from 2007 to 2011, as a Sinn Féin TD for Dublin Bay South from 2020 to 2024, and as a senator for the Labour Panel since 2025. One of Andrews's nephews, Barry Andrews, is a Fianna Fáil MEP for Dublin, while another nephew, Ryan Tubridy, is a broadcaster who formerly worked with RTÉ.

Niall Andrews died in Dublin on 16 October 2006.

== See also ==
- Families in the Oireachtas

Political offices
Preceded by Gerard Brady	Minister of State at the Department of the Environment; Oct.–Dec. 1982	Succeeded by Ruairi Quinn

Dáil	Election	Deputy (Party)	Deputy (Party)	Deputy (Party)
19th	1969	Kevin Boland (FF)	Tom O'Higgins (FG)	Richard Burke (FG)
19th	1970 by-election	Larry McMahon (FG)	Tom O'Higgins (FG)	Richard Burke (FG)
20th	1973	Larry McMahon (FG)	Ruairí Brugha (FF)	Richard Burke (FG)
21st	1977	John Kelly (FG)	Niall Andrews (FF)	John Horgan (Lab)
22nd	1981	Constituency abolished. See Dublin South		

Dáil	Election	Deputy (Party)	Deputy (Party)	Deputy (Party)	Deputy (Party)	Deputy (Party)	Deputy (Party)	Deputy (Party)
2nd	1921	Thomas Kelly (SF)	Daniel McCarthy (SF)	Constance Markievicz (SF)	Cathal Ó Murchadha (SF)	4 seats 1921–1923		
3rd	1922	Thomas Kelly (PT-SF)	Daniel McCarthy (PT-SF)	William O'Brien (Lab)	Myles Keogh (Ind.)	4 seats 1921–1923		
4th	1923	Philip Cosgrave (CnaG)	Daniel McCarthy (CnaG)	Constance Markievicz (Rep)	Myles Keogh (Ind.)	Cathal Ó Murchadha (Rep)	Michael Hayes (CnaG)	Peadar Doyle (CnaG)
4th	1923 by-election	Philip Cosgrave (CnaG)	Daniel McCarthy (CnaG)	Constance Markievicz (Rep)	Myles Keogh (Ind.)	Cathal Ó Murchadha (Rep)	Hugh Kennedy (CnaG)	Peadar Doyle (CnaG)
4th	March 1924 by-election	James O'Mara (CnaG)	Daniel McCarthy (CnaG)	Constance Markievicz (Rep)	Myles Keogh (Ind.)	Cathal Ó Murchadha (Rep)	Hugh Kennedy (CnaG)	Peadar Doyle (CnaG)
4th	November 1924 by-election	James O'Mara (CnaG)	Daniel McCarthy (CnaG)	Constance Markievicz (Rep)	Myles Keogh (Ind.)	Cathal Ó Murchadha (Rep)	Seán Lemass (SF)	Peadar Doyle (CnaG)
4th	1925 by-election	James O'Mara (CnaG)	Thomas Hennessy (CnaG)	Constance Markievicz (Rep)	Myles Keogh (Ind.)	Cathal Ó Murchadha (Rep)	Seán Lemass (SF)	Peadar Doyle (CnaG)
5th	1927 (Jun)	James Beckett (CnaG)	Vincent Rice (NL)	Constance Markievicz (FF)	Myles Keogh (Ind.)	Thomas Lawlor (Lab)	Seán Lemass (FF)	Peadar Doyle (CnaG)
5th	1927 by-election	James Beckett (CnaG)	Vincent Rice (NL)	Thomas Hennessy (CnaG)	Myles Keogh (Ind.)	Thomas Lawlor (Lab)	Seán Lemass (FF)	Peadar Doyle (CnaG)
6th	1927 (Sep)	James Beckett (CnaG)	Robert Briscoe (FF)	Thomas Hennessy (CnaG)	Myles Keogh (CnaG)	Frank Kerlin (FF)	Seán Lemass (FF)	Peadar Doyle (CnaG)
7th	1932	James Beckett (CnaG)	Robert Briscoe (FF)	Thomas Hennessy (CnaG)	Myles Keogh (CnaG)	James Lynch (FF)	Seán Lemass (FF)	Peadar Doyle (CnaG)
8th	1933	James Beckett (CnaG)	Robert Briscoe (FF)	James McGuire (CnaG)	Thomas Kelly (FF)	James Lynch (FF)	Seán Lemass (FF)	Peadar Doyle (CnaG)
9th	1937	Myles Keogh (FG)	Robert Briscoe (FF)	Thomas Lawlor (Lab)	Thomas Kelly (FF)	Joseph Hannigan (Ind.)	Seán Lemass (FF)	Peadar Doyle (FG)
10th	1938	James Beckett (FG)	Robert Briscoe (FF)	James Lynch (FF)	Thomas Kelly (FF)	Joseph Hannigan (Ind.)	Seán Lemass (FF)	Peadar Doyle (FG)
10th	1939 by-election	John McCann (FF)	Robert Briscoe (FF)	James Lynch (FF)	Thomas Kelly (FF)	Joseph Hannigan (Ind.)	Seán Lemass (FF)	Peadar Doyle (FG)
11th	1943	Maurice Dockrell (FG)	Robert Briscoe (FF)	James Lynch (FF)	James Larkin Jnr (Lab)	John McCann (FF)	Seán Lemass (FF)	Peadar Doyle (FG)
12th	1944	Maurice Dockrell (FG)	Robert Briscoe (FF)	James Lynch (FF)	James Larkin Jnr (Lab)	John McCann (FF)	Seán Lemass (FF)	Peadar Doyle (FG)
13th	1948	Constituency abolished. See Dublin South-Central, Dublin South-East and Dublin South-West.						

Dáil	Election	Deputy (Party)	Deputy (Party)	Deputy (Party)	Deputy (Party)	Deputy (Party)
22nd	1981	Niall Andrews (FF)	Séamus Brennan (FF)	Nuala Fennell (FG)	John Kelly (FG)	Alan Shatter (FG)
23rd	1982 (Feb)	Niall Andrews (FF)	Séamus Brennan (FF)	Nuala Fennell (FG)	John Kelly (FG)	Alan Shatter (FG)
24th	1982 (Nov)	Niall Andrews (FF)	Séamus Brennan (FF)	Nuala Fennell (FG)	John Kelly (FG)	Alan Shatter (FG)
25th	1987	Tom Kitt (FF)	Séamus Brennan (FF)	Anne Colley (PDs)	John Kelly (FG)	Alan Shatter (FG)
26th	1989	Tom Kitt (FF)	Séamus Brennan (FF)	Nuala Fennell (FG)	Roger Garland (GP)	Alan Shatter (FG)
27th	1992	Tom Kitt (FF)	Séamus Brennan (FF)	Liz O'Donnell (PDs)	Eithne FitzGerald (Lab)	Alan Shatter (FG)
28th	1997	Tom Kitt (FF)	Séamus Brennan (FF)	Liz O'Donnell (PDs)	Olivia Mitchell (FG)	Alan Shatter (FG)
29th	2002	Tom Kitt (FF)	Séamus Brennan (FF)	Liz O'Donnell (PDs)	Olivia Mitchell (FG)	Eamon Ryan (GP)
30th	2007	Tom Kitt (FF)	Séamus Brennan (FF)	Alan Shatter (FG)	Olivia Mitchell (FG)	Eamon Ryan (GP)
30th	2009 by-election	Tom Kitt (FF)	George Lee (FG)	Alan Shatter (FG)	Olivia Mitchell (FG)	Eamon Ryan (GP)
31st	2011	Shane Ross (Ind.)	Peter Mathews (FG)	Alan Shatter (FG)	Olivia Mitchell (FG)	Alex White (Lab)
32nd	2016	Constituency abolished. See Dublin Rathdown, Dublin South-West and Dún Laoghaire.				
