= David Andrews (politician) =

Irish politician (1935–2026)

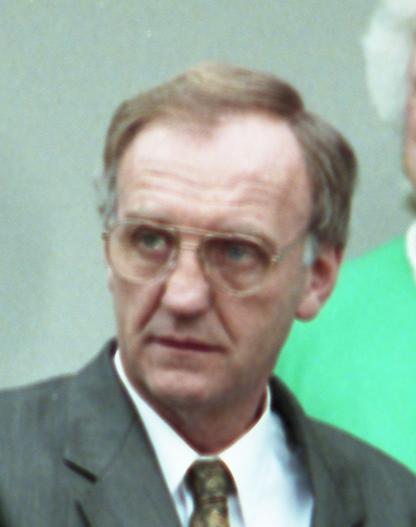
- Andrews in 1992

Minister for Foreign Affairs
- In office 8 October 1997 – 27 January 2000
- Taoiseach: Bertie Ahern
- Preceded by: Ray Burke
- Succeeded by: Brian Cowen
- In office 11 February 1992 – 12 January 1993
- Taoiseach: Albert Reynolds
- Preceded by: Gerry Collins
- Succeeded by: Dick Spring

Minister for Defence
- In office 26 June 1997 – 8 October 1997
- Taoiseach: Bertie Ahern
- Preceded by: Seán Barrett
- Succeeded by: Michael Smith
- In office 12 January 1993 – 15 December 1994
- Taoiseach: Albert Reynolds
- Preceded by: John Wilson
- Succeeded by: Hugh Coveney

Minister for the Marine
- In office 12 January 1993 – 15 December 1994
- Taoiseach: Albert Reynolds
- Preceded by: Michael Smith
- Succeeded by: Hugh Coveney

Minister of State
- 1979: Justice
- 1977–1979: Foreign Affairs

Parliamentary Secretary
- 1970–1973: Government Chief Whip
- 1970–1973: Defence

Teachta Dála
- In office June 1977 – May 2002
- Constituency: Dún Laoghaire
- In office April 1965 – June 1977
- Constituency: Dún Laoghaire and Rathdown

Personal details
- Born: 15 March 1935 Clonskeagh, Dublin, Ireland
- Died: 30 June 2026 (aged 91) County Dublin, Ireland
- Party: Fianna Fáil
- Spouse: Annette Andrews (m. 1963)
- Children: 5, including Barry and David
- Parent: Todd Andrews (father)
- Relatives: Niall Andrews (brother); Chris Andrews (nephew); Ryan Tubridy (nephew)
- Education: University College Galway; Dublin City University

David Andrews (15 March 1935 – 30 June 2026) was an Irish Fianna Fáil politician who served as Minister for Foreign Affairs from 1992 to 1993 and 1997 to 2000, Minister for Defence from 1993 to 1994 and June 1997 to October 1997, Minister for the Marine from 1993 to 1994, Minister of State at the Department of Foreign Affairs from 1977 to 1979 and Government Chief Whip and Minister of State at the Department of Defence from 1970 to 1973. He served as a Teachta Dála (TD) from 1965 to 2002.

== Life and career ==
=== Early life ===
Andrews's father was the Irish republican and public servant Todd Andrews, who had been active during the War of Independence and the Civil War before going on to head several state bodies, including the Irish Tourist Association, the ESB, Bord na Móna, and CIÉ, as well as chairing the RTÉ Authority. His mother, Mary Coyle, had been a member of Cumann na mBan and had been held in Kilmainham Gaol.

=== Political career ===
Andrews was first elected to Dáil Éireann at the 1965 general election as a Fianna Fáil TD for the Dún Laoghaire and Rathdown constituency. In May 1970, in a reshuffle following the Arms Crisis, he was appointed Parliamentary Secretary to the Taoiseach, with special responsibility as Chief Whip, and Parliamentary Secretary to the Minister for Defence. He served until Fianna Fáil left office in 1973.

Following the 1977 general election, Fianna Fáil was back in office and Jack Lynch appointed Andrews as Parliamentary Secretary to the Minister for Foreign Affairs. He held the junior ministry through 1977, the year Ireland first took on the presidency of the Council of the European Union. In the 1979 Fianna Fáil leadership election Andrews supported George Colley, the favoured candidate of the existing leadership. However, Charles Haughey, in a close vote, was elected party leader and Taoiseach.

He was confined to the backbenches during Haughey's thirteen-year period as leader. During this period he maintained his legal practice as a barrister and campaigned for the Guildford Four, the Birmingham Six, and Brian Keenan. He remained a vocal critic of Haughey during this period. After the Progressive Democrats were founded in 1985 Andrews considered joining the new party. In February 1992, Albert Reynolds succeeded Haughey as Taoiseach, and Andrews was appointed Minister for Foreign Affairs for the first of two occasions he would hold the post. In January 1993, following the formation of a coalition with the Labour Party, Andrews was appointed Minister for Defence and Minister for the Marine. He served until this government fell in December 1994.

After the 1997 general election, Fianna Fáil returned to office in coalition with the Progressive Democrats, with Bertie Ahern as Taoiseach. Andrews was first appointed Minister for Defence; later that year, after the resignation of Ray Burke, he was appointed Minister for Foreign Affairs for the second time. His period as Foreign Minister was successful regarding the Northern Ireland peace talks. In April 1998, the Good Friday Agreement was signed and was later approved in referendums in Ireland and Northern Ireland; Andrews played a significant part in the negotiations that brought it about. In 1999, Ireland joined the Partnership for Peace project. During his time as a minister, Andrews also campaigned within government for Ireland's ratification of the Maastricht and Amsterdam treaties, and was involved in winning a seat for the country on the UN Security Council. Andrews stepped down as Minister for Foreign Affairs in January 2000.

In May 2000, he was appointed to the non-executive position as Chairman of the Irish Red Cross Society, a role during which he campaigned on behalf of those affected by humanitarian crises in Somalia, Darfur, and East Timor, serving until 2009.

Andrews retired from politics at the 2002 general election, and his son Barry was elected for the Dún Laoghaire constituency, later going on to serve as a Fianna Fáil MEP for Dublin.

In 2006, Andrews was awarded the Chevalier de la Légion d'Honneur, France's foremost national honour.

== Personal life ==
Andrews married Annette in 1963, and they had five children; two sons and three daughters. In addition to Barry, his other son David Andrews, Jnr is a comedian who works under the stage name of David McSavage. His brother Niall Andrews was a TD and MEP. Ryan Tubridy, the former RTÉ broadcaster, and Chris Andrews, a Sinn Féin politician, were among his nephews.

=== Death and legacy ===
Andrews died on 30 June 2026, at the age of 91. Taoiseach Micheál Martin said Andrews left "an enormous footprint" on Irish life, and recalled his sharpness, hard work, and dedication to the peace process, alongside his career as a barrister and his advocacy on human rights cases such as the Birmingham Six and Guildford Four. President Catherine Connolly described Andrews as someone who would be remembered for his integrity and his lifelong dedication to human rights, pointing to his contribution during the Good Friday Agreement talks and his concern for humanitarian crises in Rwanda, Somalia, and Palestine. Former president Michael D. Higgins said Andrews had made a major contribution to Irish politics, recalling that working with him in cabinet during the 1990s had been a positive experience, and citing his help in securing Collins Barracks for public use and arranging for the Irish Reserve Forces to take part in the filming of Braveheart. Tánaiste Simon Harris said Andrews had given decades of service to public life and had played a key role at an important time for the country, particularly in the talks that led to the Belfast Agreement. Fianna Fáil MEPs Billy Kelleher, Cynthia Ní Mhurchú, and Barry Cowen also offered their condolences to their European Parliament colleague Barry Andrews and his family, with Kelleher describing Andrews as a major figure in Irish politics whose dedication to the country, to Fianna Fáil, and to his Dún Laoghaire constituency was widely respected across party lines.

== See also ==
- Families in the Oireachtas

Political offices
Preceded by Desmond O'Malley	Government Chief Whip; 1970–1973	Succeeded by John Kelly
Preceded by Desmond O'Malley	Parliamentary Secretary to the Minister for Defence; 1970–1973	Succeeded by John Kelly
New office	Minister of State at the Department of Foreign Affairs; 1977–1979	Office abolished
Preceded by Gerry Collins	Minister for Foreign Affairs; 1992–1993	Succeeded by Dick Spring
Preceded by John Wilson	Minister for Defence; 1993–1994	Succeeded by Hugh Coveney
Preceded by Michael Woods	Minister for the Marine; 1993–1994	Succeeded by Hugh Coveney
Preceded by Seán Barrett	Minister for Defence; 1997	Succeeded by Michael Smith
Preceded by Ray Burke	Minister for Foreign Affairs; 1997–2000	Succeeded by Brian Cowen

Dáil	Election	Deputy (Party)	Deputy (Party)	Deputy (Party)	Deputy (Party)
13th	1948	Seán Brady (FF)	Joseph Brennan (CnaP)	Liam Cosgrave (FG)	3 seats until 1961
14th	1951	Seán Brady (FF)	Percy Dockrell (FG)	Liam Cosgrave (FG)	3 seats until 1961
15th	1954	Seán Brady (FF)	Percy Dockrell (FG)	Liam Cosgrave (FG)	3 seats until 1961
16th	1957	Seán Brady (FF)	Lionel Booth (FF)	Liam Cosgrave (FG)	3 seats until 1961
17th	1961	Seán Brady (FF)	Lionel Booth (FF)	Liam Cosgrave (FG)	Percy Dockrell (FG)
18th	1965	David Andrews (FF)	Lionel Booth (FF)	Liam Cosgrave (FG)	Percy Dockrell (FG)
19th	1969	David Andrews (FF)	Barry Desmond (Lab)	Liam Cosgrave (FG)	Percy Dockrell (FG)
20th	1973	David Andrews (FF)	Barry Desmond (Lab)	Liam Cosgrave (FG)	Percy Dockrell (FG)
21st	1977	Constituency abolished. See Dún Laoghaire			

Dáil	Election	Deputy (Party)	Deputy (Party)	Deputy (Party)	Deputy (Party)	Deputy (Party)
21st	1977	David Andrews (FF)	Liam Cosgrave (FG)	Barry Desmond (Lab)	Martin O'Donoghue (FF)	4 seats 1977–1981
22nd	1981	David Andrews (FF)	Liam T. Cosgrave (FG)	Barry Desmond (Lab)	Martin O'Donoghue (FF)	Seán Barrett (FG)
23rd	1982 (Feb)	David Andrews (FF)	Liam T. Cosgrave (FG)	Barry Desmond (Lab)	Martin O'Donoghue (FF)	Seán Barrett (FG)
24th	1982 (Nov)	David Andrews (FF)	Liam T. Cosgrave (FG)	Barry Desmond (Lab)	Monica Barnes (FG)	Seán Barrett (FG)
25th	1987	David Andrews (FF)	Geraldine Kennedy (PDs)	Barry Desmond (Lab)	Monica Barnes (FG)	Seán Barrett (FG)
26th	1989	David Andrews (FF)	Brian Hillery (FF)	Eamon Gilmore (WP)	Monica Barnes (FG)	Seán Barrett (FG)
27th	1992	David Andrews (FF)	Helen Keogh (PDs)	Eamon Gilmore (DL)	Niamh Bhreathnach (Lab)	Seán Barrett (FG)
28th	1997	David Andrews (FF)	Monica Barnes (FG)	Eamon Gilmore (Lab)	Mary Hanafin (FF)	Seán Barrett (FG)
29th	2002	Barry Andrews (FF)	Fiona O'Malley (PDs)	Eamon Gilmore (Lab)	Mary Hanafin (FF)	Ciarán Cuffe (GP)
30th	2007	Barry Andrews (FF)	Seán Barrett (Note: Served as Ceann Comhairle in the 31st Dáil from 2011 to 2016 and was returned automatically at the 2016 general election.) (FG)	Eamon Gilmore (Lab)	Mary Hanafin (FF)	Ciarán Cuffe (GP)
31st	2011	Mary Mitchell O'Connor (FG)	Seán Barrett (FG)	Eamon Gilmore (Lab)	Richard Boyd Barrett (PBP)	4 seats from 2011
32nd	2016	Mary Mitchell O'Connor (FG)	Seán Barrett (FG)	Maria Bailey (FG)	Richard Boyd Barrett (AAA–PBP)	4 seats from 2011
33rd	2020	Jennifer Carroll MacNeill (FG)	Ossian Smyth (GP)	Cormac Devlin (FF)	Richard Boyd Barrett (S–PBP)	4 seats from 2011
34th	2024	Jennifer Carroll MacNeill (FG)	Barry Ward (FG)	Cormac Devlin (FF)	Richard Boyd Barrett (PBP–S)	4 seats from 2011
