= Brendan Ogle =

Irish trade union official

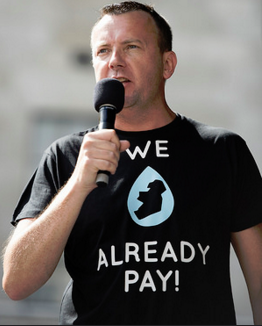
- Ogle speaking at a demonstration against Water Charges in the mid-2010s

Brendan Ogle is an Irish trade union official. He is a senior Unite the Union officer in the Republic of Ireland.

== Career ==
Ogle led the Irish Locomotive Drivers Association and is the former secretary of the ESB Group of unions. He was the first non-ESB employee to become secretary of the GoU. During his tenure he caused controversy by referring to workers in the ESB as 'spoilt' at a meeting of the dissident Republican group Éirígí. Throughout this time he was, according to the Irish Independent, "subject to much adverse media comment" and he and his family endured threats to kill them. Among those to publicly defend him were former Irish presidential candidate and senior Labour Party member Fergus Finlay.

Ogle was in 2014 to 2016 a central figure in the protest movement against Irish Water's introduction of water charges in Ireland. He was a co-founder of the "Home Sweet Home" campaign, which saw protesters seize the vacant Apollo House in Dublin to house homeless people.

In March 2018, Ogle announced that he would launch a new political party in September. As of August 2023 no such party has been launched.

Ogle is a senior officer in Unite the Union. In 2023 he made a complaint to the Workplace Relations Commission about allegations of discrimination, harassment, whistleblower penalisation and the failure to provide reasonable adjustment after he returned to work from cancer treatment.

Ogle unsuccessfully contested the 2024 European Parliament election for the Dublin constituency as an independent candidate.

== Personal life ==
Ogle comes from Dundalk, County Louth, and had eight siblings. He is married to Amanda La Combre. Ogle was diagnosed with throat cancer in July 2020, and is now clear of the disease.

Ogle has been chairman of Dundalk F.C. Supporters' Club.
