= Community Democrats of Ireland =

Defunct Irish political party

- Founded: 1979
- Dissolved: 1979
- Ideology: Liberalism; Social Liberalism; Pro-Europeanism
- European affiliation: European Liberals and Democrats

The Community Democrats of Ireland was a minor political party in Ireland, formed in 1979. It was founded to contest the European Parliament elections, of which the 1979 European Parliament election was the first held. Promoted as an explicitly Liberal party, it was promoted as the Irish affiliate of the European Liberals and Democrats.

== Candidates ==
The party touted that it was approaching a number of non-affiliated politicians in Ireland to run under its banner, such as Seán Dublin Bay Rockall Loftus, Rita Childers and Noel Browne. However ultimately none of these figures committed to running for the party by the day of elections, damaging the party's credibility. Seán Dublin Bay Rockall Loftus's flirtation with the Community Democrats of Ireland caused much consternation with another political group he was already affiliated with; the "Community Group" who contested local elections in Dublin as Independents but who worked together as an organisation. The Community Group accused Loftus of breaking their constitution by joining the CDI. It was perhaps this rocking of the boat that quickly saw Loftus back away from the CDI. While he did contest both the local and European elections that year, he contested both under the banner of an being Independent.

The expectation of the Community Democrats of securing Noel Browne to their party might have been misplaced given that Browne was in the midst of getting his own new political party, the Socialist Labour Party, up and running.

== Television coverage ==
The party asked to be given an equal amount of air time as other parties on Ireland's national broadcaster RTÉ, but RTÉ turned this down, much to their chagrin. RTÉ stated that as the party had not achieved a reasonable threshold of the vote in a general or local election, they could not reasonably expect to be platformed. The CDI retorted that as this was their first-ever election they could not reasonably be expected to have past results by which to be judged by. The Community Democrats of Ireland sought an injunction against RTÉ but this did not lead anywhere either. However, the decision by RTÉ to exclude the Community Democrats did raise questions in Irish society about what the criteria for receiving air time should be and if there was bias against newly founded parties.

== Party values ==
A flavour of the values of the party might be extrapolated from the background of CDI Candidate Christoper Morris; Morris noted in campaign literature that he was a Member of Executive Committee of Irish Family Planning Association and chairman of that group when a case was brought against it by IFPA for publishing a booklet on contraception, as well as a Founder member of Family Services Ltd., who pioneered a nationwide distribution of contraceptives through the post. He also noted he had been a part of a previous attempt to launch a Liberal Party in Ireland in the 1960s, and that he was a Humanist and former President of the Irish Humanist Association. Finally, he also mentioned being a member of the council of the Irish Association of Civil Liberties and chairman of its sub-committee for reform of Divorce law.

== At the polls ==
Three candidates did stand for the party on election day; Michael B Crowe in Munster where he received 2,268 first preference votes, Kevin Clear in Dublin where he received 915 first preference votes and Christopher Morris in Connacht–Ulster where he received 447 votes.

Michael B Crowe was their most successful candidate despite the fact that one week before election day he declared that he was done campaigning as upon speaking to the electorate door to door, he said he came to realise the electorate "knew absolutely nothing" about the EEC or how it operated, and that people should no longer bother to vote for him. Crowe has been a former Limerick City Councillor and had the highest-profile of those who ran for the party on the day.

Following the 1979 European elections, the CDI did not contest any further elections.

== Election results ==
Election	Seats won	±	First-pref. votes
1979	0 / 15	-	3,630
