= Tom Arnold (economist) =

Irish agricultural economist and public policy advisor

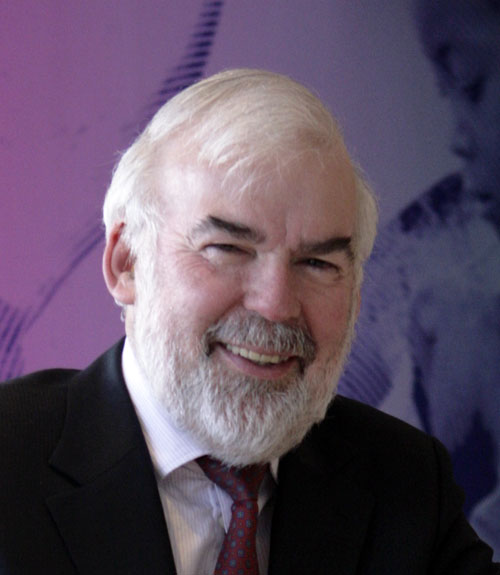
- Born: Ireland
- Occupation(s): Director General of IIEA, former CEO of Concern Worldwide and special representative for hunger.

Tom Arnold is an Irish agricultural economist and public policy advisor who has worked for the European Commission, the Irish Department of Agriculture and Food and Concern Worldwide. He has served on governmental and non-governmental bodies at Irish, European and international level, with a particular focus on sustainable food systems and nutrition.

== Education ==
Arnold has a degree in agricultural economics from University College Dublin, an MBA from the Université catholique de Louvain, and a masters in strategic management from Trinity College Dublin.

== Career ==
Tom Arnold started his professional career as a stagiere (intern) in the Cabinet of Dr Patrick Hillery, European Commissioner for Social Affairs (September 1973 - February 1974). From 1974 to 1983, he served as an official in the European Commission; in the directorate general for agriculture (1974-77), the Commission delegations in the Ivory Coast (1977-78) and Malawi (1979), and in the directorate general for development (1980-83).

He returned to Ireland in 1983 to take up the role as Senior Economist with ACOT - the farm advisory, training and education service. In 1988 he joined the Department of Agriculture and Food as Chief Economist and in 1993 was appointed Assistant Secretary General. In 2001, he was appointed Chief Executive of Concern Worldwide, Ireland’s largest humanitarian agency, a post he held until February 2013.

In October 2012, Arnold was asked to chair the Irish Constitutional Convention which was tasked with examining and making recommendations on a number of articles in the Irish Constitution which dated from 1937. The Convention consisted of 100 people, 66 of whom were citizens chosen as representative of the population, 33 were politicians reflecting the strength of the political parties in the Oireachtas (four of the politicians were from Northern Ireland). The Convention had its first official meeting in December 2012 and concluded its work in March 2014.

Arnold was appointed Director General of the Institute of International and European Affairs (IIEA), Ireland’s leading think-tank, a position he held until March 2017.

In August 2014, Arnold accepted a request from the UN to coordinate the Scaling Up Nutrition Movement (SUN Movement), which brings together governments, civil society and the private sector, to improve nutrition at national and international level. The request was made following the appointment by UN Secretary-General Ban Ki-moon of Dr David Nabarro, the current coordinator of the SUN Movement, to be the UN system's senior coordinator of the response to the Ebola virus disease. In Dr Nabarro's absence as SUN coordinator, Arnold was to provide strategic leadership to the SUN Movement, working closely with the existing SUN networks and the SUN secretariat, based in Geneva. The appointment was for a six-month period, starting 1 September 2014.

== Boards and committees ==
Arnold has served as chair or member on numerous boards/committees at Irish, European and international level. These include:

- Board Member, Global FoodBanking Network, 2023-24.
- Irish Government’s Special Envoy for Food Systems, 2021-22.
- Chair, EU Commission High Level Expert Group on Food Systems Science, 2021-22.
- Member, Champions Network, UN Food Systems Summit, 2020-21.
- Chair, Food Vision 2030 Agri-Food Strategy Committee, 2019-21.
- Chair, National Task Team on Rural Africa (NTTRA), 2019-20.
- Member, High Level Group on EU Policy Innovation, 2020-24.
- Chair, EU Commission Task Force Rural Africa (TFRA), 2018-18.
- Board member, Global Alliance for Improved Nutrition (GAIN), 2018-24
- Board member, Sight and Life Foundation, 2018-24
- Member, Malabo-Montpellier Panel, 2015-24
- Chair, All-Island Civic Forum on Brexit, 2016-18
- Member, Global Panel on Agriculture and Food Systems for Nutrition (GloPan), 2014-24
- Member, Irish Times Trust, 2008-18
- Chair, Irish Times Trust, 2012-18
- Member, Irish Times Board, 2012-18
- Member, Consortium Board, Consultative Group International Agricultural Research (CGIAR), 2010-12
- Board Member, Mary Robinson Foundation for Climate Justice, 2009-19.
- Member, Irish Government’s Commission on Taxation, 2008-09
- Member, Irish Hunger Task Force, 2007-08
- Member, Advisory Board, International Food Policy Research Institute (IFPRI), 2007-12
- Advisory Board, UN Central Emergency Response Fund (CERF), 2006-08
- Chair, European Food Security Group (EFSG), (EU NGOs), 2005-10
- Member, UN Millennium Project Hunger Task Force, 2003-05
- Member, Policy Review Group for Irish Aid, 2000-01
- Chair, OECD Committee of Agriculture, 1993-98.
- Chair, OECD Working Group on Agricultural Policies and Markets, 1990-93
- Chair, EURONAID (EU NGOs working on food aid), 1993-96
- Chair, Irish Council of European Movement, 1991-92
- The United Nations Scaling Up Nutrition (SUN) Movement

== Awards & Distinctions ==
- Life Membership, Royal Dublin Society (RDS), 2022
- Member, Royal Irish Academy (RIA), 2016
- Rehab People of the Year Award, 2013
- Adjunct Professor, UCD, Agriculture and Food Science,
- Adjunct Professor, DCU School of Law and Government
- Adjunct Professor, UCC College of Business and Law
- Honorary Doctor of Science, University College of Dublin (UCD), 2010
- Honorary Doctor of Laws, National University of Ireland (NUI), 2009
