= Barry Andrews (politician) =

Irish politician (born 1967)

Barry Andrews MEP
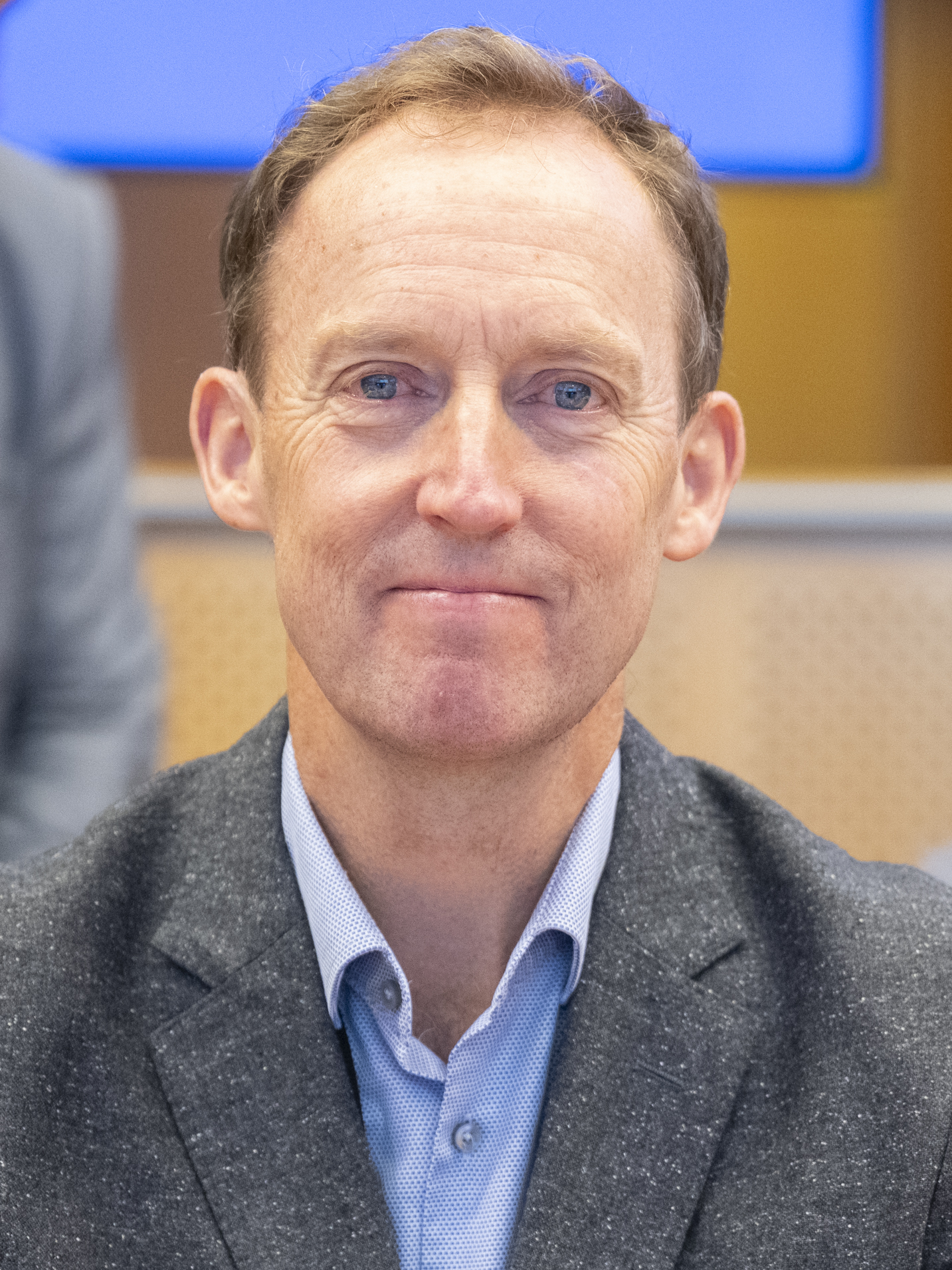
- Andrews in 2024

Member of the European Parliament
- Incumbent
- Assumed office 1 February 2020
- Constituency: Dublin

Minister of State
- 2008–2011: Children

Teachta Dála
- In office May 2002 – February 2011
- Constituency: Dún Laoghaire

Personal details
- Born: 16 May 1967 (age 59) Dublin, Ireland
- Party: Ireland: Fianna Fáil; EU: Renew Europe
- Parent: David Andrews (father)
- Relatives: David McSavage (brother); Todd Andrews (grandfather); Niall Andrews (uncle); Chris Andrews (cousin); Ryan Tubridy (cousin)
- Education: University College Dublin
- Website: barryandrews.ie

Barry Andrews (born 16 May 1967) is an Irish politician who serves as a Member of the European Parliament (MEP) for the Dublin constituency. He is a member of Fianna Fáil, part of Renew Europe. He served as Minister of State for Children from 2008 to 2011. He was a Teachta Dála (TD) for Dún Laoghaire from 2002 to 2011.

The Andrews family have a long connection with Fianna Fáil. Before entering political life, Andrews was a secondary school teacher. He was the Director-General of the Dublin-based Institute of International and European Affairs (IIEA), a partly Irish State-funded EU think tank, since 2017. He was CEO of GOAL from 2012 to 2016, during which the agency grew from a turnover of €60 million to more than €150M. He announced his resignation to allow for ‘a fresh start in terms of leadership’ in October 2016 in the wake of a fraud in relation to alleged bribery and bid-rigging on humanitarian aid contracts for Syria, that was discovered in March 2016.

== Early career and personal life ==
He was born in Dublin in 1967, into a political family. His grandfather, Todd Andrews, fought in the Irish War of Independence and became a founder-member of Fianna Fáil, and his grandmother, Mary Coyle, was a member of Cumann na mBan. Andrews's father, David Andrews served as a TD from 1965 to 2002 and was Foreign minister, while his uncle, Niall Andrews, was a Fianna Fáil TD and MEP and his cousin, Chris Andrews (son of Niall Andrews), has been a Sinn Féin TD since 2020 (having previously served as a Fianna Fáil TD from 2007 to 2011). In April 2018, Andrews was described as "part of Fianna Fáil royalty".

Andrews was educated at Blackrock College before attending university at University College Dublin (UCD). He worked as a secondary school teacher in Dublin from 1991 until 1997, working in Ballyfermot Senior College, Sutton Park School and Bruce College. While a secondary school teacher, he studied law at King's Inns and qualified as a barrister in 1997. He was called to the Bar in 1997 and practiced as a barrister until 2003.

He is married and has two sons and a daughter. His brother, David McSavage is a comedian, and he is a first cousin of former RTÉ television and radio presenter Ryan Tubridy.

== Political career ==
Andrews was first elected to public office at the 1999 Dún Laoghaire–Rathdown County Council election. He was elected to Dáil Éireann at the 2002 general election.

In June 2006, Andrews led a group of Fianna Fáil backbenchers in an unsuccessful attempt to establish a backbench committee to influence government policy. At the 2007 general election, Andrews retained his seat in Dún Laoghaire with 8,587 votes.

=== Minister of State for Children ===
Andrews was appointed Minister of State for Children in May 2008. As minister, he framed the government response to the Ryan Report on Institutional Abuse. This included an Implementation Plan that delivered an additional 200 social workers for the HSE Child and Family Services. In April 2009, Andrews introduced the Early Childhood Care and Education (ECCE) Scheme, which provided, for the first time, free universal access to pre-school education. The scheme benefited 65,000 children in 2013.

After the release of the Murphy Report into child abuse in the Dublin diocese in November 2009, Andrews, speaking at a conference in Dublin Castle, said it would be "amazing" if there were no consequences for people who were the subject of adverse findings in the report. Asked about the position of the Bishop of Limerick, Donal Murray, the Minister said, "I think it's everybody's view that if adverse findings are made against an individual in a commission of inquiry then it would be amazing that there be no consequences for them.". Bishop Murray subsequently apologised to survivors and resigned from office.

In December 2009, Andrews oversaw the introduction of government policy to lower the legal age of consent to 16. Citing a Joint Oireachtas Committee on the Constitution report which recommended the legal age be reduced to 16 from the current 17. Andrews expressed the view the existing laws were "inappropriate" and out of touch with the modern reality of sexual relations between young people, and promised to publish legislation to change the age of Consent to 16. He noted that Ireland and Malta were "the only countries in Europe with an age of consent of 17". However, the law was not passed by the Oireachtas before the 2011 general election, after which Fianna Fáil lost office to a Fine Gael–Labour coalition.

On 31 January 2011, in the run up to the general election, Andrews was named Health spokesman by the party leader, Micheál Martin. He lost his seat at the general election.

=== Children's referendum ===
In September 2012, he was appointed Fianna Fáil Director of Elections for the children's referendum.

=== European Parliament ===
In February 2019, he was selected as the Fianna Fáil candidate for the Dublin constituency at the 2019 European Parliament election. He was elected in May 2019 receiving 14.1% of the 1st preference votes, but as the fourth candidate elected he did not take his seat until after the UK left the European Union on 31 January 2020.

In June 2023, Andrews was the recipient of the Defence, Security and Space Award at The Parliament Magazine's annual MEP Awards.

Barry Andrews is a member of the Committee on International Development, the Committee on International Trade, the Committee on Women's Rights and Gender Equality, the Delegation to the EU-UK Parliamentary Partnership Assembly, the Delegation to the EU-Turkey Joint Parliamentary Assembly and the Delegation for relations with South Africa. His contributions to the International Trade committee have included his work on the Corporate Sustainability Due Diligence Directive (CSDDD) where he was a rapporteur.

Andrews is a founder member of the European Parliament's Sustainable Development Goals (SDG) Alliance. Andrews also founded the Brussels-Belfast Forum with members of the Northern Ireland Assembly.

He was appointed EU Chief Observer for the 2023 Nigerian Federal and State elections by High Representative Vice President Josep Borrell. A report on the election was subsequently produced highlighting that the election was marred by a lack of transparency, public mistrust in the Independent National Electoral Commission (INEC), violence, and vote buying, stressing the need for comprehensive electoral reforms.

Andrews was re-elected to the European Parliament at the 2024 European Parliament election.

== Non-political career ==
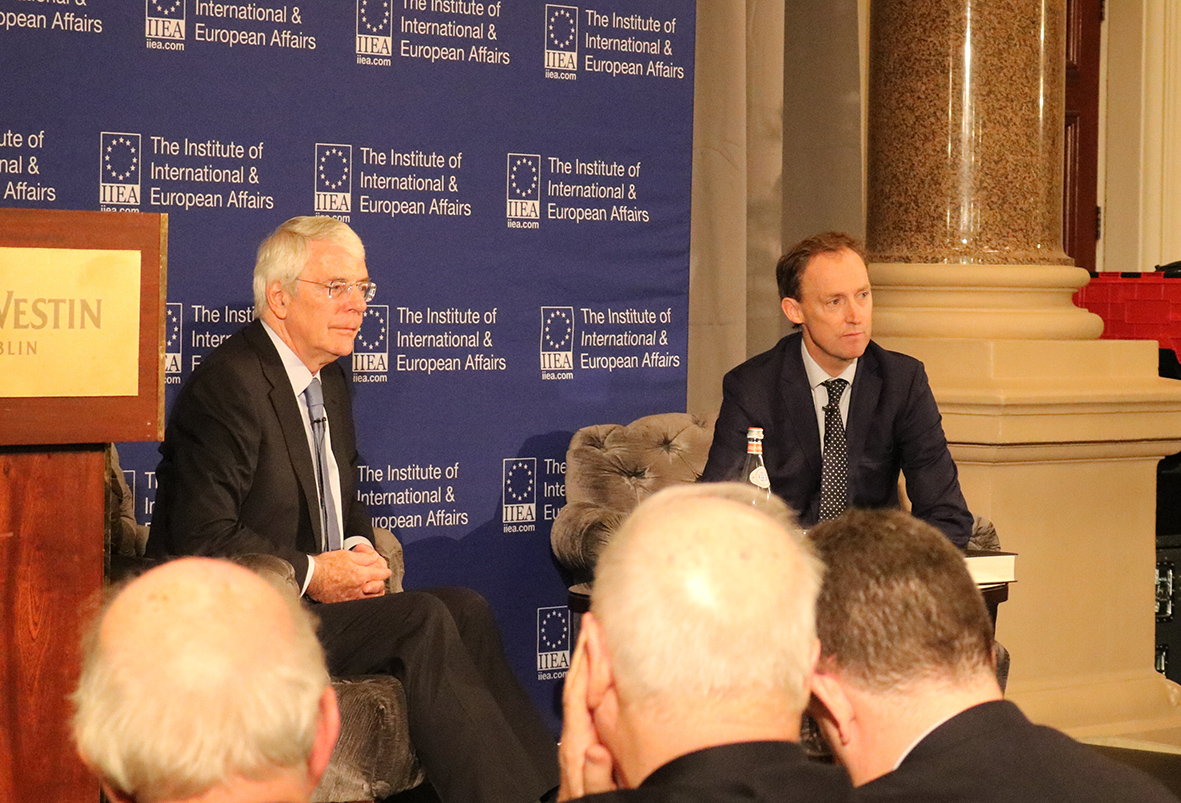
Sir John Major and Barry Andrews at an Institute of International and European Affairs event to mark the 20th Anniversary of the Good Friday Agreement

In November 2012, Andrews was appointed chief executive of the Irish aid charity GOAL, replacing the retiring founder John O'Shea. In October 2016, Andrews resigned from GOAL after it was revealed that other senior executives of Goal had been involved in "large-scale fraud", though there was no suggestion that he himself was involved in the scandal. In October 2017, the new CEO of GOAL announced a deficit of €31.6 million due to the fraud but said that it would survive after "one of the most challenging years" in its 40-year history.

In March 2017, Andrews was appointed as Director-General of the Irish State-supported EU think tank and advocacy body, the Institute of International and European Affairs (IIEA), with the Chairperson of the IIEA, former Leader of the Labour Party, Ruairi Quinn, describing Andrews as having the "political and administrative skills" of value to the IIEA.

== See also ==
- Families in the Oireachtas
- Institute of International and European Affairs

Political offices
| Preceded by Brendan Smith | Minister of State for Children; 2008–2011 | Office abolished |

| Dáil | Election | Deputy (Party) | Deputy (Party) | Deputy (Party) | Deputy (Party) | Deputy (Party) |
|---|---|---|---|---|---|---|
| 21st | 1977 | David Andrews (FF) | Liam Cosgrave (FG) | Barry Desmond (Lab) | Martin O'Donoghue (FF) | 4 seats 1977–1981 |
| 22nd | 1981 | David Andrews (FF) | Liam T. Cosgrave (FG) | Barry Desmond (Lab) | Martin O'Donoghue (FF) | Seán Barrett (FG) |
| 23rd | 1982 (Feb) | David Andrews (FF) | Liam T. Cosgrave (FG) | Barry Desmond (Lab) | Martin O'Donoghue (FF) | Seán Barrett (FG) |
| 24th | 1982 (Nov) | David Andrews (FF) | Liam T. Cosgrave (FG) | Barry Desmond (Lab) | Monica Barnes (FG) | Seán Barrett (FG) |
| 25th | 1987 | David Andrews (FF) | Geraldine Kennedy (PDs) | Barry Desmond (Lab) | Monica Barnes (FG) | Seán Barrett (FG) |
| 26th | 1989 | David Andrews (FF) | Brian Hillery (FF) | Eamon Gilmore (WP) | Monica Barnes (FG) | Seán Barrett (FG) |
| 27th | 1992 | David Andrews (FF) | Helen Keogh (PDs) | Eamon Gilmore (DL) | Niamh Bhreathnach (Lab) | Seán Barrett (FG) |
| 28th | 1997 | David Andrews (FF) | Monica Barnes (FG) | Eamon Gilmore (Lab) | Mary Hanafin (FF) | Seán Barrett (FG) |
| 29th | 2002 | Barry Andrews (FF) | Fiona O'Malley (PDs) | Eamon Gilmore (Lab) | Mary Hanafin (FF) | Ciarán Cuffe (GP) |
| 30th | 2007 | Barry Andrews (FF) | Seán Barrett (Note: Served as Ceann Comhairle in the 31st Dáil from 2011 to 2016 and was returned automatically at the 2016 general election.) (FG) | Eamon Gilmore (Lab) | Mary Hanafin (FF) | Ciarán Cuffe (GP) |
| 31st | 2011 | Mary Mitchell O'Connor (FG) | Seán Barrett (FG) | Eamon Gilmore (Lab) | Richard Boyd Barrett (PBP) | 4 seats from 2011 |
| 32nd | 2016 | Mary Mitchell O'Connor (FG) | Seán Barrett (FG) | Maria Bailey (FG) | Richard Boyd Barrett (AAA–PBP) | 4 seats from 2011 |
| 33rd | 2020 | Jennifer Carroll MacNeill (FG) | Ossian Smyth (GP) | Cormac Devlin (FF) | Richard Boyd Barrett (S–PBP) | 4 seats from 2011 |
| 34th | 2024 | Jennifer Carroll MacNeill (FG) | Barry Ward (FG) | Cormac Devlin (FF) | Richard Boyd Barrett (PBP–S) | 4 seats from 2011 |
