= Todd Andrews =

Irish republican and public servant (1901–1985)

- Born: Christopher Stephen Andrews; 6 October 1901; Summerhill, Dublin, Ireland
- Died: 11 October 1985 (aged 84); Phibsborough, Dublin, Ireland
- Spouses: Mary Coyle (m. 1928; died 1967) Joyce Duffy (m. 1968)
- Children: 4, including David and Niall
- Relatives: Ryan Tubridy (grandson); Barry Andrews (grandson); Chris Andrews (grandson); David McSavage (grandson)
- Military career
- Allegiance: Ireland
- Branch: Irish Republican Army; Anti-Treaty IRA
- Service years: 1919–1923
- Wars: Irish War of Independence; Irish Civil War
- Other work: Public servant

Christopher Stephen "Todd" Andrews (6 October 1901 – 11 October 1985) was an Irish republican and later a public servant. He participated in the Irish War of Independence and the Civil War but never stood for election or held public office.

== Early life and education ==
Andrews was born at 42 Summerhill in Dublin in 1901 to Christopher Andrews (then an Auctioneer) and Mary Andrews (née Moran), daughter of a Dublin Metropolitan Police inspector. In 1910 the family moved to Terenure, where his father had a grocery shop. He acquired the nickname "Todd" because of his perceived resemblance to English comic strip hero Alonzo Todd, who appeared in The Magnet. Andrews briefly attended St. Enda's School and completed his secondary education at Synge Street CBS. He went on to study commerce at University College Dublin, and although his studies were interrupted by his participation in the Irish War of Independence and the Irish Civil War, he returned to the university where he obtained a degree in Commerce.

== Nationalist revolutionary ==
Andrews was politicised by the 1916 Rising. He joined the Irish Volunteers at the age of fifteen and had an active role in the Irish Republican Army during the Irish War of Independence, fighting with the Rathfarnham company of the 4th Dublin Brigade. He was arrested and imprisoned in 1920 but released after ten days on hunger strike. He was interned at the Curragh in 1921 but tunnelled his way to freedom with two comrades. Andrews opposed the Anglo-Irish Treaty and, after the creation of the IRA's Four Courts Executive in April 1922, became assistant to Director of Operations Ernie O'Malley. He took the republican side during the Irish Civil War and was wounded in the fighting in O'Connell Street, Dublin. Andrews was appointed the IRA's General Headquarters and travelled the country supervising the training of volunteers. Andrews was interned by the government of the Irish Free State until early 1924.

== Public servant ==
After graduation, Andrews found employment as an accountant with the then-fledgling Irish Tourist Association where he structured their accounts office, as well as editing several of their publications. In the summer of 1930 he was offered a position as an accountant with the Electricity Supply Board at a time when they were expanding the National Grid and constructing significant Hydro-Electric projects such as Ardnacrusha.

In 1933, Andrews was appointed to the Department of Industry and Commerce, where he dealt with the industrialisation of Irish turf development. Andrews initially set up a network of co-ops that locally harvested and sold turf but quickly saw that this arrangement was insufficient to successfully modernise turf production in Ireland on a commercial scale; it also drew the ire of coal merchants who worried about the effect of a State-led competition to their markets. However such worries were overcome by Andrews through shrewd and active man management, culminating with the establishment of the Turf Development Board in 1934. The new semi-state company helped overcome future issues in managing peat harvesting on a grand scale and schemes set up to help fuel Ireland during The Emergency, and ultimately led to the formation of Bord Na Mona in 1946, a body that he ultimately became Chief Executive of.

== CIE ==
In 1958, Andrews was offered and accepted the chairmanship of the Irish transport company Córas Iompair Éireann (CIÉ), which was in a perilous fiscal state. Following on from the findings of the Beddy Report, he drew from his business experience and oversaw a large restructuring of the Irish rail system. This included the purchase of diesel electric engines from General Motors, the introduction of modern coaching stock, the phased closure of uneconomic services and elimination of slow stopping services, the introduction of new braked good wagons as well as a revamp of ticketing arrangements. He also oversaw the closures of several lines that were perennially uneconomic and loss-making. This included:

- The Bray to Harcourt Street railway line. The closure of the Harcourt Street line is undoubtedly the most infamous railway closure in Ireland. The line had not been profitable for decades, in spite of it seeing many cost-cutting measures to try and improve business. Electric signalling, AEC railcars and summer special trains to Wicklow and Wexford had been introduced on the line to try and increase its footfall and to lower costs to no avail. On foot of a recommendation of the Beddy Report, the line ceased services on 31 December 1958 and formally abandoned in January 1959. As the city expanded outwards in the mid and late 1970s the route was kept clear and partially reopened as part of the LUAS Green Line in 2004.
- The substantial railway network west of Cork city. This included lines to Bandon, Bantry and Macroom, and branch lines to Clonakility, Skibbereen and Kinsale. Again, the lines struggled for business and saw diminishing business as cars, buses and lorries became more affordable and able to address passenger needs more practically.
- The Hill of Howth Tramway, which was inherited from the Great Northern Railway. This anomalous line was built around Howth Head to exploit an expected tourism boom in the seaside village that never came to be. While the line served its sparse locality quite well it never turned a profit and escaped closure several times while under the auspices of the Great Northern Railway Board. However, its infrastructure and rolling stock had not been replaced during its lifetime and, with this weighed against a need for essential cost-cutting, its closure was inevitable giving CIE's poor fiscal state and statutory requirements to become profitable.
- The West Clare Railway. Again, this line's came against a backdrop of cost-cutting but unlike other narrow gauge lines it saw the introduction of a fleet of modern diesel locomotives and railcars. While the new stock improved service levels and economics of the lines considerably they weren't enough to save the line.
- The Cahersiveen, Kenmare and Kanturk lines. As was common with many rural railways the traffic levels on these three lines were sparse. The branches to Kanturk and Kenmare has diesel engines allocated to them too, but to no avail.

Andrews also oversaw the resurgence and modernisation of CIE road transport, provincial and city bus services in Ireland. Steam traction was eliminated under his chairmanship, a cost benefit that undoubtedly saved CIE from certain collapse, while modern vans and lorries took on the delivery of freights in place of horse and carriage. Despite such economies, CIE still struggled under a state expectation that it run without subvention; an impossible task given the sparse traffic and passenger numbers in a land cropped by emigration. Issues of Partition often affected the company's operation; CIE was forced to introduce additional bus services in border areas upon the withdrawal of the Ulster Transport Authority from cross-border services, notably with the GNRB in 1958 and the County Donegal Railway Joint Committee in 1959.

== RTÉ ==
He retired from CIE upon his 65th birthday but before he stood down he became chairman of the RTÉ Authority at the request of Seán Lemass. During his time as chairman he oversaw significant changes as the broadcaster expanded RTÉ Radio and Television, as well as the introduction of FM radio and colour television, the opening of a Belfast news desk, the beginning of the move from the GPO to a new complex at Montrose, Donnybrook. Andrews frequently rebutted Government interference in the organisation, even rebutting advances from then Minister Erskine Childers to suppress some employees who were suspected of being subversives. Todd resigned from RTÉ in 1970 after his son David Andrews was appointed Chief Whip to the Taoiseach.

== Political views ==
Todd Andrews was a firm advocate of state-sponsored enterprise and economic intervention, drawing inspiration from the statist approaches he observed in Germany and the Soviet Union, particularly regarding the use of peat bogs for fuel. Identifying as a radical and aligning with the leftist tendencies of early Fianna Fáil, Andrews viewed reunification of Ireland as essential to resolving the country's challenges. In his 1970s column, Gallimaufry, for de Valera's Irish Press, Andrews consistently argued for British withdrawal from Northern Ireland and the end of their governance claims over any part of the island.

Progressive for his time, he held liberal views on issues like divorce and contraception and harboured a deep-seated antipathy toward the Catholic Church's political influence, rooted in his republicanism and his excommunication during the Civil War. Known for his uncompromising opinions, his bluntness often led to workplace tensions, with Bord na Móna employees joking about the necessity of appointing someone to mitigate the strikes his outspokenness provoked.

Andrews' son Niall would inherit much of his political views.

== Later life and family ==
He was the recipient of several honorary doctorates and degrees from various universities. He published his autobiography in two volumes in 1979 and 1982, under the titles of Dublin Made Me and Man of No Property.

Andrews died in Dublin at the age of 84.

Two of his sons, Niall Andrews and David Andrews, became TDs; David Andrews became Minister for Foreign Affairs.

His brother, Paddy Andrews was a football player, most notably with Bohemians who was also capped by the Irish Free State. Todd Andrews' grandson Ryan Tubridy was a radio presenter and television chatshow host on RTÉ, while grandsons Barry Andrews and Chris Andrews were also TDs. Another grandson is comedian David McSavage.

== Bibliography ==
=== Autobiography ===
- Dublin Made Me (Lilliput, 2001) ISBN 978-1-901866-65-0
- Man of no Property (Lilliput, 2001) ISBN 978-1-901866-66-7
