= Chris Andrews (Irish politician) =

Irish politician (born 1964)

Senator Chris Andrews
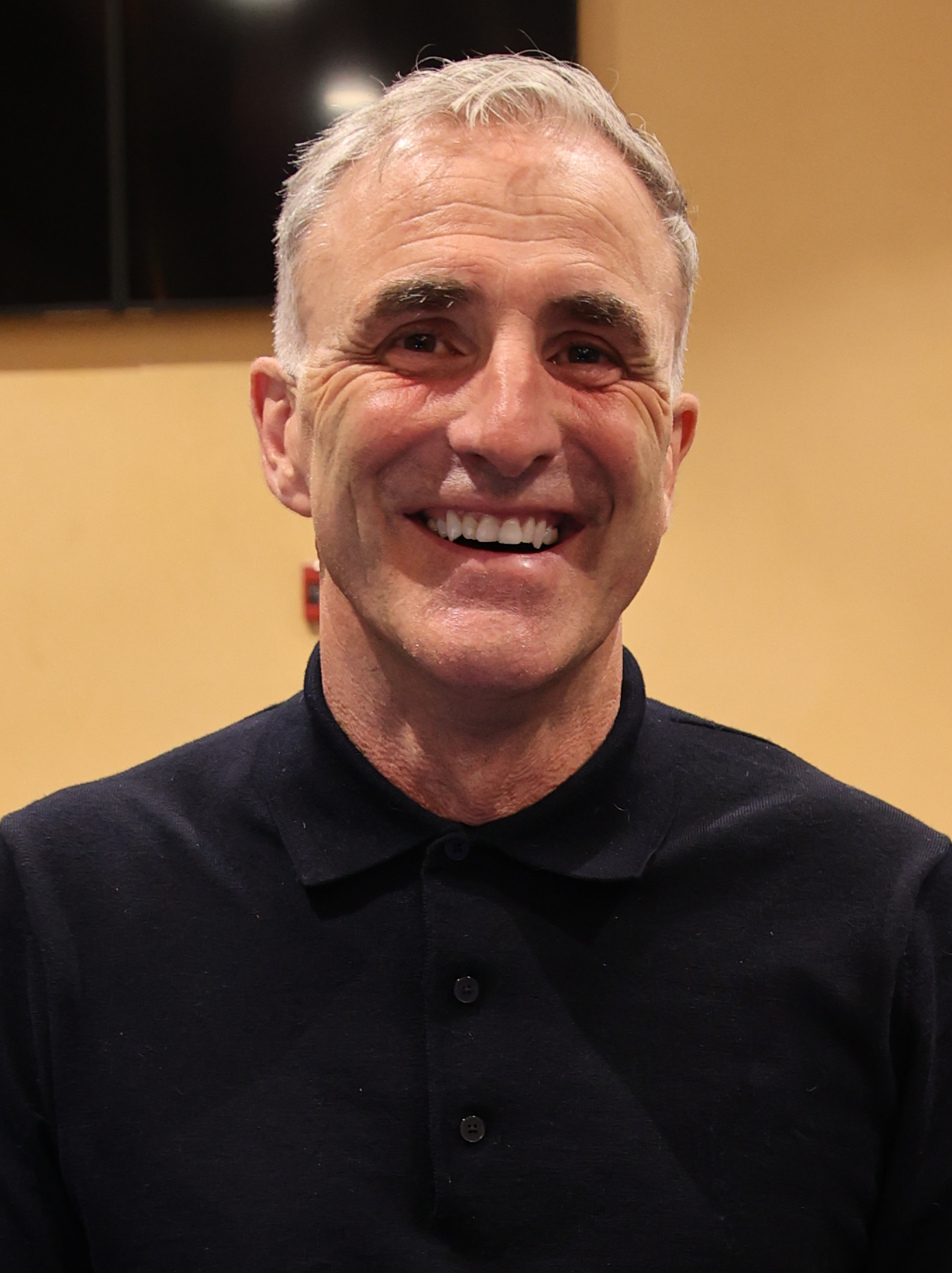
- Andrews in 2025

Senator
- Incumbent
- Assumed office 30 January 2025
- Constituency: Labour Panel

Teachta Dála
- In office February 2020 – November 2024
- Constituency: Dublin Bay South
- In office May 2007 – February 2011
- Constituency: Dublin South-East

Personal details
- Born: 25 May 1964 (age 62) Dublin, Ireland
- Party: Sinn Féin (since 2012)
- Other political affiliations: Fianna Fáil (until 2012)
- Spouse: Tina Andrews (m. 1997)
- Children: 2
- Parent: Niall Andrews (father)
- Relatives: Todd Andrews (grandfather); David Andrews (uncle); Barry Andrews (cousin); David McSavage (cousin); Ryan Tubridy (cousin)
- Education: NUI Maynooth

Chris Andrews (born 25 May 1964) is an Irish Sinn Féin politician who has served as a senator for the Labour Panel since January 2025. He was previously a Fianna Fáil politician and a Teachta Dála (TD) for the Dublin South-East constituency from 2007 to 2011, then, after a gap of nine years, he was a Sinn Féin TD for the Dublin Bay South constituency from 2020 to 2024. While a senator, he participated in the 2025 Global Sumud Flotilla and was kidnapped on the way to Gaza by the Israeli Navy and held at Ktzi'ot Prison before he was released after several days in captivity in early October 2025.

== Early life and family ==
He is the grandson of Todd Andrews, a leading Irish republican figure and member of Fianna Fáil following the foundation of the party. His father Niall Andrews and his uncle David Andrews both served as Fianna Fáil Teachtaí Dála (TDs), while his first cousin Barry Andrews was elected a Fianna Fáil TD at the 2002 general election and is now a Member of the European Parliament. He was the fifth member of his family to have sat in the Dáil. He is a cousin of the comedy writer and performer David McSavage, and another cousin, Ryan Tubridy, was the host of The Late Late Show on RTÉ One.

Andrews is married and has two daughters.

As a child, Andrews appeared in the Safe Cross Code road safety TV advertisement along with his younger sister, Niamh.

Andrews graduated from NUI Maynooth with a degree in community and youth work.

== Political career ==
Elections to the Dáil
| Party | Election | | FPv | FPv% | Result |
|---|---|---|---|---|---|
| Fianna Fáil | Dublin South-East | 2007 | 6,600 | 19.5 | Elected on count 3/5 |
| Fianna Fáil | Dublin South-East | 2011 | 3,922 | 11.2 | Eliminated on count 10/10 |
| Sinn Féin | Dublin Bay South | 2016 | 3,774 | 9.5 | Eliminated on count 6/8 |
| Sinn Féin | Dublin Bay South | 2020 | 6,361 | 16.1 | Elected on count 8/8 |
| Sinn Féin | Dublin Bay South | 2024 | 4,875 | 12.2 | Eliminated on count 12/12 |

In May 2007, Andrews topped the poll in the Dublin South-East constituency, on his second attempt, gaining 6,600 first preferences. He was a member of Dublin City Council from 1999 to 2004, 2006 to 2007 and 2014 to 2020, representing both Fianna Fáil and subsequently Sinn Féin.

Andrews was convenor of the Oireachtas Finance Committee, and was a member of the Trade, Enterprise and Employment Committee and the European Scrutiny Committee in the 30th Dáil.

During the 2009 European Parliament election in Ireland, Andrews distributed political leaflets showing him shaking hands with Syrian dictator Bashar al-Assad, taken during a meeting earlier that year. The leaflets bore the headline "EU must maintain pressure on Israel to negotiate meaningfully". The leaflets' contents were called back into question in September 2013 when Andrews joined Sinn Féin.

=== Twitter account revelation and departure from Fianna Fáil ===
In the aftermath of the 2011 general election, in which he and many other Fianna Fáil members lost their seats as TDs, Fianna Fáil were struggling in the polls. In August 2012, Andrews left the Fianna Fáil party. He cited his disenchantment with Micheál Martin and the lack of direction of the party. His announcement came after an individual whose wife had allegedly been criticized by a Twitter account sent a 35 page dossier about their investigation into the owner of the account to the Sunday Independent which revealed Andrews was the owner of an account used to anonymously attack party leaders and other senior members, including a constituency rival, Jim O'Callaghan. Andrews stated that his decision to leave the party had been in his mind before the prior election, although his resignation followed after he had been revealed as the person behind the account.

=== As a member of Sinn Féin ===
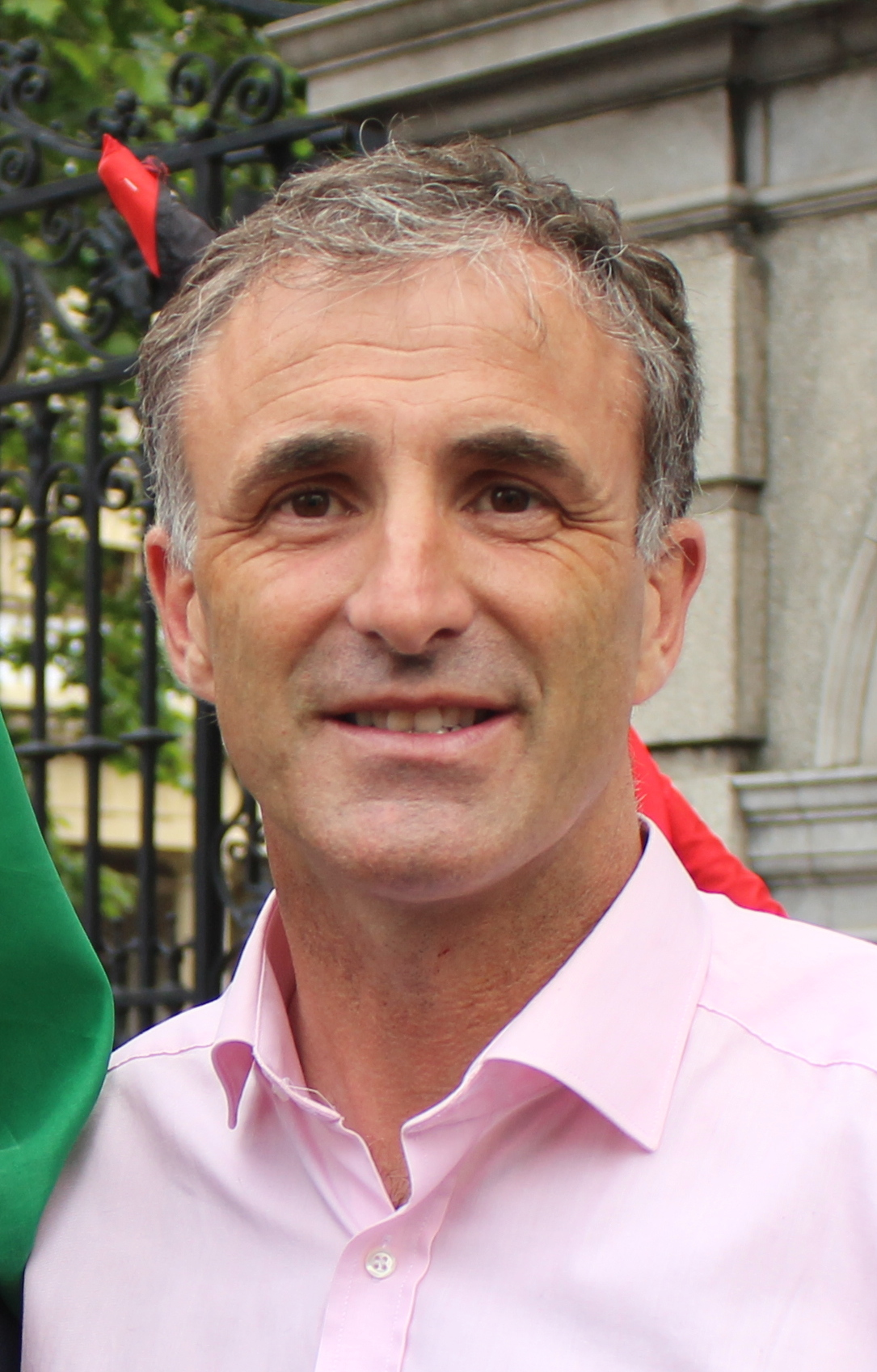
Andrews in 2014

In September 2013, he joined Sinn Féin and successfully contested the 2014 local elections for the Pembroke South Dock local electoral area of Dublin City Council for the party.

In February 2015, he was selected to contest the new constituency of Dublin Bay South at the 2016 general election; however, he lost the election.

He was the Sinn Féin candidate for the Dublin Bay South constituency at the 2020 general election and was elected. Daniel Ceitinn was co-opted to Andrews' seat on Dublin City Council following his election to the Dáil.

Following the 7 October 2023 Hamas-led attacks in Israel, EU president Ursula von der Leyen stated, "I unequivocally condemn the attack carried out by Hamas terrorists against Israel. It is terrorism in its most despicable form. Israel has the right to defend itself against such heinous attacks". In response, Andrews tweeted: "It seems that according to the EU and Ireland, only Palestine has no right to defend itself against murder, torture and apartheid". Andrews' comments were covered in The Irish Times and an opinion piece by Harry McGee offered the view that Andrews was less critical of Hamas than of the Israeli Defence Forces. Following this article, Andrew began legal proceedings against The Irish Times, citing defamation. Andrews' case was criticised by pro-journalist organisations such as the press ombudsman Susan McKay, the National Union of Journalists and Reporters without Borders.

Andrews lost his seat at the 2024 general election. Andrews was elected as a senator at the 2025 Seanad election on the Labour Panel. He participated in the 2025 Global Sumud Flotilla on the vessel Spectre attempting to provide humanitarian aid to Gaza. On 23 September 2025, the Spectre was attacked by Israeli drones that dropped four explosive devices on the vessel and after the attack Andrews said the Irish government should have sent Irish Army personnel. On 1 October 2025, the Spectre was intercepted on its way to Gaza by the Israeli Navy, which kidnapped Andrews. After the interception of the Spectre, Andrews and the other passengers were forced to sit at gunpoint for the 15 hours it took for the vessel to reach Ashdod, where Andrews said they were handcuffed, blindfolded, and placed in a prison van. On 2 October 2025, fellow Irish senator Pauline Tully claimed he was kidnapped or abducted and said "Communication with Senator Chris Andrews was lost last night. It was a time of worry for all of us because we did not know what was happening to him or where he was, and even his family did not know. He has since been kidnapped or abducted. I do not think 'detained' is the correct word because he was in international waters on a peaceful mission." Andrews was later released on 6 October 2025 after he had been imprisoned with the other flotilla participants at Ktzi'ot Prison for several days.

== Political views ==
Andrews visited Gaza in 2008. He has said there was no electricity during the three days he visited. During the 2008–2009 Israel–Gaza conflict Andrews called for an economic, diplomatic and political boycott of Israel, for its ambassador to Ireland to be expelled, and for shops to remove produce from Israeli settlements. He said that Israel had the right to defend itself, but that its disproportionate response meant that "...it can only now be classified as a terror state". On 30 May 2010, he was one of three Irish politicians who were prevented from leaving Cyprus to join the 2010 Gaza Freedom Flotilla by Cypriot government authorities. The flotilla was carrying aid to the blockaded Gaza Strip and was raided by Israeli commandos, who killed nine flotilla passengers on 31 May 2010.

In June 2011 Andrews stated on Twitter: "Lab[our] are a pro-Israeli party & [Fine Gael] foreign affairs on Israel are determined by Israeli puppets in Ireland. Alan Shatter Gov will support Israel".

In March 2011, Andrews set off on another flotilla to Gaza. One of his shipmates was Aengus Ó Snodaigh. In November 2011, Andrews was reported to be on board another ship headed to Gaza on a humanitarian mission. In 2013, Andrews was reported to have spent time in Palestine doing aid work.

In December 2020, Andrews apologised for liking tweets about Laurel Hubbard that were perceived as transphobic by transgender rights campaigners. The tweet criticised transgender women participating in female sports.

== See also ==
- Families in the Oireachtas

| Dáil | Election | Deputy (Party) | Deputy (Party) | Deputy (Party) | Deputy (Party) |
|---|---|---|---|---|---|
| 13th | 1948 | John A. Costello (FG) | Seán MacEntee (FF) | Noël Browne (CnaP) | 3 seats 1948–1981 |
| 14th | 1951 | John A. Costello (FG) | Seán MacEntee (FF) | Noël Browne (Ind.) | 3 seats 1948–1981 |
| 15th | 1954 | John A. Costello (FG) | Seán MacEntee (FF) | John O'Donovan (FG) | 3 seats 1948–1981 |
| 16th | 1957 | John A. Costello (FG) | Seán MacEntee (FF) | Noël Browne (Ind.) | 3 seats 1948–1981 |
| 17th | 1961 | John A. Costello (FG) | Seán MacEntee (FF) | Noël Browne (NPD) | 3 seats 1948–1981 |
| 18th | 1965 | John A. Costello (FG) | Seán MacEntee (FF) | Seán Moore (FF) | 3 seats 1948–1981 |
| 19th | 1969 | Garret FitzGerald (FG) | Noël Browne (Lab) | Seán Moore (FF) | 3 seats 1948–1981 |
| 20th | 1973 | Garret FitzGerald (FG) | Fergus O'Brien (FG) | Seán Moore (FF) | 3 seats 1948–1981 |
| 21st | 1977 | Garret FitzGerald (FG) | Ruairi Quinn (Lab) | Seán Moore (FF) | 3 seats 1948–1981 |
| 22nd | 1981 | Garret FitzGerald (FG) | Gerard Brady (FF) | Seán Moore (FF) | Richie Ryan (FG) |
| 23rd | 1982 (Feb) | Garret FitzGerald (FG) | Gerard Brady (FF) | Ruairi Quinn (Lab) | Alexis FitzGerald Jnr (FG) |
| 24th | 1982 (Nov) | Garret FitzGerald (FG) | Gerard Brady (FF) | Ruairi Quinn (Lab) | Joe Doyle (FG) |
| 25th | 1987 | Garret FitzGerald (FG) | Gerard Brady (FF) | Ruairi Quinn (Lab) | Michael McDowell (PDs) |
| 26th | 1989 | Garret FitzGerald (FG) | Gerard Brady (FF) | Ruairi Quinn (Lab) | Joe Doyle (FG) |
| 27th | 1992 | Frances Fitzgerald (FG) | Eoin Ryan Jnr (FF) | Ruairi Quinn (Lab) | Michael McDowell (PDs) |
| 28th | 1997 | Frances Fitzgerald (FG) | Eoin Ryan Jnr (FF) | Ruairi Quinn (Lab) | John Gormley (GP) |
| 29th | 2002 | Michael McDowell (PDs) | Eoin Ryan Jnr (FF) | Ruairi Quinn (Lab) | John Gormley (GP) |
| 30th | 2007 | Lucinda Creighton (FG) | Chris Andrews (FF) | Ruairi Quinn (Lab) | John Gormley (GP) |
| 31st | 2011 | Lucinda Creighton (FG) | Eoghan Murphy (FG) | Ruairi Quinn (Lab) | Kevin Humphreys (Lab) |
| 32nd | 2016 | Constituency abolished. See Dublin Bay South. | | | |

| Dáil | Election | Deputy (Party) | Deputy (Party) | Deputy (Party) | Deputy (Party) |
|---|---|---|---|---|---|
| 32nd | 2016 | Eamon Ryan (GP) | Jim O'Callaghan (FF) | Kate O'Connell (FG) | Eoghan Murphy (FG) |
| 33rd | 2020 | Eamon Ryan (GP) | Jim O'Callaghan (FF) | Chris Andrews (SF) | Eoghan Murphy (FG) |
| 33rd | 2021 by-election | Eamon Ryan (GP) | Jim O'Callaghan (FF) | Chris Andrews (SF) | Ivana Bacik (Lab) |
| 34th | 2024 | James Geoghegan (FG) | Jim O'Callaghan (FF) | Eoin Hayes (SD) | Ivana Bacik (Lab) |
