= Dublin (European Parliament constituency) =

Constituency of the European Parliament

- European Parliament constituency
- Location among the current constituencies

- Dublin shown within Ireland
- Member state: Ireland
- Created: 1979
- MEPs: 4 (1979–2009); 3 (2009–2020); 4 (2020–)

Dublin is a European Parliament constituency in Ireland. It elects four Members of the European Parliament (MEPs) using proportional representation by means of the single transferable vote.

== History and boundaries ==
The constituency was created in 1979 for the first direct elections to the European Parliament. It has always contained the whole of County Dublin and the city of Dublin only (with the county defined since 1994 as the counties of Dún Laoghaire–Rathdown, Fingal, South Dublin).

From 1979 to 2004, it elected 4 MEPs; this was reduced to 3 for the 2009 election. For the 2019 European Parliament election, a reapportionment following Brexit and the loss of 73 MEPs from the United Kingdom gave two additional seats to Ireland. Following a recommendation of the Constituency Commission, Dublin gained an extra seat, from 3 to 4. However, the last candidate elected did not take his seat until after the United Kingdom withdrew from the European Union.

Elections	Seats
1979, 1984, 1989, 1994, 1999, 2004	4
2009, 2014	3
2019, 2024	4

== MEPs ==
Members of the European Parliament (MEPs) for Dublin 1979–
Key to parties: DL = Democratic Left; FF = Fianna Fáil; FG = Fine Gael; GP = Green; Ind. = Independent; I4C = Inds. 4 Change; Lab = Labour; SF = Sinn Féin; SP = Socialist Party; WP = Workers' Party
Parl.	Election	Member (Party)	Member (Party)	Member (Party)	Member (Party)
1st	1979	John O'Connell (Lab)	Richie Ryan (FG)	Michael O'Leary (Lab)	Síle de Valera (FF)
1st	1981 (Note: John O'Connell was substituted by John Horgan (LAB / PES) on 21 October 1981.)	John Horgan (Lab)	Richie Ryan (FG)	Michael O'Leary (Lab)	Síle de Valera (FF)
1st	1981 (Note: Michael O'Leary was substituted by Frank Cluskey (LAB / PES) on 1 July 1981.)	John Horgan (Lab)	Richie Ryan (FG)	Frank Cluskey (Lab)	Síle de Valera (FF)
1st	1983 (Note: John Horgan resigned on 1 January 1983 and was substituted by Flor O'Mahony (LAB / PES) on 2 March 1983.)	Flor O'Mahony (Lab)	Richie Ryan (FG)	Frank Cluskey (Lab)	Síle de Valera (FF)
1st	1983 (Note: Frank Cluskey was substituted by Brendan Halligan (LAB / PES) on 2 March 1983.)	Flor O'Mahony (Lab)	Richie Ryan (FG)	Brendan Halligan (Lab)	Síle de Valera (FF)
2nd	1984	Mary Banotti (FG)	Richie Ryan (FG)	Eileen Lemass (FF)	Niall Andrews (FF)
2nd	1986 (Note: Richie Ryan was substituted by Chris O'Malley (FG / EPP) on 3 June 1986.)	Mary Banotti (FG)	Chris O'Malley (FG)	Eileen Lemass (FF)	Niall Andrews (FF)
3rd	1989	Mary Banotti (FG)	Proinsias De Rossa (WP)	Barry Desmond (Lab)	Niall Andrews (FF)
3rd	1992 (Note: Proinsias De Rossa was substituted by Des Geraghty (DL / EUL) on 18 February 1992.)	Mary Banotti (FG)	Des Geraghty (DL)	Barry Desmond (Lab)	Niall Andrews (FF)
4th	1994	Mary Banotti (FG)	Patricia McKenna (GP)	Bernie Malone (Lab)	Niall Andrews (FF)
5th	1999	Mary Banotti (FG)	Patricia McKenna (GP)	Proinsias De Rossa (Lab)	Niall Andrews (FF)
6th	2004	Gay Mitchell (FG)	Mary Lou McDonald (SF)	Proinsias De Rossa (Lab)	Eoin Ryan (FF)
7th	2009	Gay Mitchell (FG)	Joe Higgins (SP)	Proinsias De Rossa (Lab)	3 seats 2009–2020
7th	2011 (Note: Joe Higgins was substituted by Paul Murphy (SP / GUE/NGL) on 1 April 2011.)	Gay Mitchell (FG)	Paul Murphy (SP)	Proinsias De Rossa (Lab)	3 seats 2009–2020
7th	2012 (Note: Proinsias De Rossa was substituted by Emer Costello (LAB / S&D) in February 2012.)	Gay Mitchell (FG)	Paul Murphy (SP)	Emer Costello (Lab)	3 seats 2009–2020
8th	2014	Brian Hayes (FG)	Lynn Boylan (SF)	Nessa Childers (Ind.)	3 seats 2009–2020
9th	2019	Frances Fitzgerald (FG)	Ciarán Cuffe (GP)	Clare Daly (I4C)	3 seats 2009–2020
9th	2020 (Note: Barry Andrews, the fourth candidate elected in 2019, did not take his seat until the UK left the EU and its MEPs vacated their seats on 31 January 2020.)	Frances Fitzgerald (FG)	Ciarán Cuffe (GP)	Clare Daly (I4C)	Barry Andrews (FF)
10th	2024	Regina Doherty (FG)	Lynn Boylan (SF)	Aodhán Ó Ríordáin (Lab)	Barry Andrews (FF)

Note: The columns in this table are used only for presentational purposes, and no significance should be attached to the order of columns. For details of the order in which seats were won at each election, see the detailed results of that election.

== Elections ==
*: Outgoing MEP elected at the previous election.
†: Outgoing MEP co-opted subsequent to the previous election.
‡: Outgoing MEP elected for East at the previous election.

=== 2024 election ===
2024 European Parliament election: Dublin (4 seats)
Party	Candidate	FPv%	Count																		
Party	Candidate	FPv%	1	2	3	4	5	6	7	8	9	10	11	12	13	14	15	16	17	18	19
Fianna Fáil	Barry Andrews	16.50	62,147	62,205	62,268	62,298	62,368	62,434	62,463	62,601	62,741	62,784	63,672	63,740	63,866	64,102	65,167	66,226	67,179	69,110	76,881
Fine Gael	Regina Doherty	16.28	61,344	61,380	61,426	61,447	61,525	61,604	61,627	61,724	61,838	61,878	62,309	62,398	62,509	62,738	63,672	65,148	66,529	68,725	77,442
Sinn Féin	Lynn Boylan	9.41	35,431	35,445	35,479	35,535	35,600	35,707	35,758	36,093	36,312	36,497	36,980	37,099	37,487	44,985	45,780	47,349	53,248	64,586	68,235
Green	Ciarán Cuffe	8.55	32,204	32,220	32,244	32,265	32,313	32,764	32,776	32,845	33,055	33,095	33,622	33,668	33,737	33,900	34,635	37,842	40,393	43,582	
Labour	Aodhán Ó Ríordáin	8.16	30,733	30,769	30,812	30,844	30,944	31,083	31,124	31,173	31,546	31,662	31,975	32,046	32,253	32,557	32,970	37,403	41,911	46,912	63,526
Independent Ireland	Niall Boylan	8.13	30,637	30,670	30,737	30,811	31,038	31,119	31,356	32,045	32,219	33,053	33,415	35,121	39,615	40,012	43,235	43,642	44,932	49,490	50,416
Inds. 4 Change	Clare Daly	7.13	26,855	26,893	26,952	27,056	27,168	27,428	27,500	27,694	28,050	28,325	28,664	29,022	29,759	30,167	31,388	32,870	39,334		
PBP–Solidarity	Bríd Smith	5.73	21,577	21,611	21,654	21,751	21,956	22,282	22,384	22,459	22,963	23,232	23,513	23,746	24,284	25,222	25,759	28,772			
Social Democrats	Sinéad Gibney	4.33	16,319	16,338	16,358	16,396	16,487	16,808	16,821	16,888	17,116	17,176	17,469	17,540	17,679	17,898	18,396				
Sinn Féin	Daithí Doolan	2.86	10,766	10,782	10,802	10,866	10,933	10,973	11,023	11,093	11,204	11,379	11,479	11,604	11,822						
Aontú	Aisling Considine	2.84	10,693	10,729	11,098	11,163	11,248	11,340	11,418	11,911	12,016	12,385	12,624	13,054	13,903	14,117					
Independent	Malachy Steenson	1.89	7,128	7,196	7,381	7,480	7,773	7,833	8,152	8,307	8,813	9,466	9,639	11,483							
Independent	Umar Al-Qadri	1.25	4,707	4,737	4,763	4,774	4,886	5,023	5,032	5,121	5,293	5,329									
Ireland First	Philip Dwyer	1.19	4,479	4,491	4,536	4,770	4,814	4,856	5,206	5,603	5,765	6,676	6,705								
Irish Freedom	Diarmaid Ó Conoráin	0.94	3,546	3,588	3,659	4,101	4,201	4,226	4,654	5,023	5,160										
Independent	Brendan Ogle	0.84	3,148	3,281	3,418	3,506	3,733	3,917	3,993	4,052											
National Party	Rebecca Barrett	0.80	2,997	3,004	3,033	3,096	3,130	3,179	3,908												
National Party	Patrick Quinlan	0.69	2,595	2,604	2,642	2,785	2,850	2,862													
Rabharta	Robin Cafolla (Note: Did not appear on the ballot as Rabharta. The Electoral Commission proposed the registration of the party to contest European and local elections on 12 April. However, as the proposed decision was subject to a 21-day appeal period, it was not in force for the 7 June 2024 elections.)	0.67	2,514	2,542	2,576	2,610	2,723														
Independent	Stephen O'Rourke	0.60	2,250	2,337	2,413	2,475															
The Irish People	Andy Heasman	0.54	2,028	2,057	2,092																
Independent	Eamonn Murphy	0.41	1,557	1,713																	
Independent	Conor Murphy	0.28	1,065																		
Electorate: 890,468 Valid: 376,720 Spoilt: 9,483 (2.5%) Quota: 75,345 Turnout: 386,203 (43.4%)

=== 2019 election ===
4 MEPs were elected in 2019 but the last MEP elected would not take their seat until a reallocation of seats in the European Parliament after Brexit had taken effect and the MEPs elected for the United Kingdom vacated their seats. This would take place on 31 January 2020

2019 European Parliament election: Dublin (4* seats)
Party	Candidate	FPv%	Count															
Party	Candidate	FPv%	1	2	3	4	5	6	7	8	9	10	11	12	13	14	15	16
Green	Ciarán Cuffe	17.5	63,849	63,895	63,997	64,314	64,406	64,588	64,853	65,291	65,683	66,370	69,282	71,255	73,028			
Fine Gael	Frances Fitzgerald	16.2	59,067	59,089	59,135	59,250	59,317	59,375	59,448	59,575	59,724	60,062	61,528	61,880	72,446	78,580		
Fianna Fáil	Barry Andrews	14.1	51,420	51,446	51,506	51,599	51,708	51,913	51,997	52,078	52,451	53,159	53,980	54,418	56,110	59,619	63,177	68,952
Inds. 4 Change	Clare Daly	11.6	42,305	42,344	42,391	42,533	42,673	42,744	43,400	44,159	45,570	46,850	48,559	52,382	52,930	55,752	65,683	87,770
Sinn Féin	Lynn Boylan	10.8	39,387	39,428	39,457	39,526	39,646	39,701	40,045	40,470	41,786	42,317	42,873	45,216	45,552	46,704	51,632	
Social Democrats	Gary Gannon	5.6	20,331	20,360	20,398	20,507	20,578	20,647	21,002	21,561	22,054	22,426	24,051	25,502	25,915	29,720		
Labour	Alex White	5.0	18,293	18,312	18,350	18,414	18,445	18,513	18,942	19,088	19,226	19,661	20,905	21,303	22,205			
Fine Gael	Mark Durkan	4.5	16,473	16,488	16,534	16,562	16,637	16,704	16,733	16,778	16,875	17,144	17,480	17,649				
People Before Profit	Gillian Brien (Note: Contested as part of Solidarity–People Before Profit.)	3.0	10,864	10,896	10,918	10,968	11,006	11,036	11,370	13,134	13,584	13,912	14,358					
Independent	Alice-Mary Higgins	3.0	10,846	10,867	10,907	11,045	11,129	11,228	11,434	11,751	12,039	12,887						
Independent	Ben Gilroy	2.1	7,594	7,627	7,648	7,689	8,051	8,450	8,511	8,609								
Independent	Gemma O'Doherty	1.8	6,659	6,689	6,782	6,867	7,594	8,451	8,661	8,768	10,622							
Solidarity	Rita Harrold	1.4	4,967	4,999	5,028	5,088	5,125	5,171	5,607									
Workers' Party	Éilis Ryan	1.0	3,701	3,722	3,745	3,784	3,817	3,895										
Independent	Eamonn Murphy	0.7	2,519	2,575	2,666	2,750	2,915											
Independent	Hermann Kelly	0.7	2,441	2,473	2,506	2,539												
Independent	Aisling McNiffe	0.4	1,572	1,641	1,690													
Independent	Mark Mullan	0.3	932	969														
Independent	Tony Bosco Lowth	0.2	727															
Electorate: 884,118 Valid: 363,947 Spoilt: 15,345 (4.1%) Quota: 72,790 Turnout: 379,292 (42.9%)

The count was suspended overnight after count 14 to clarify whether Lynn Boylan's votes should be redistributed between the two continuing candidates, Barry Andrews and Clare Daly. The usual count rules had been amended so the practice of deeming candidates elected without reaching the quota would not apply. The order in which candidates were elected was required as the candidate elected to the fourth seat would not take their seat until after the withdrawal of the United Kingdom from the European Union.

=== 2014 election ===
2014 European Parliament election: Dublin (3 seats)
Party	Candidate	FPv%	Count						
Party	Candidate	FPv%	1	2	3	4	5	6	7
Sinn Féin	Lynn Boylan	23.6	83,264	84,289	89,764				
Fine Gael	Brian Hayes	15.5	54,676	55,132	55,656	63,591	65,132	73,317	73,405
Fianna Fáil	Mary Fitzpatrick	12.6	44,283	44,954	45,779	48,360	50,585		
Green	Eamon Ryan	12.5	44,078	45,173	47,256	53,179	59,803	71,909	72,256
Independent	Nessa Childers	10.2	35,939	37,706	41,787	46,531	59,955	72,413	73,598
Socialist Party	Paul Murphy	8.5	29,953	31,310	39,313	41,373			
Labour	Emer Costello	7.4	25,961	26,232	27,194				
People Before Profit	Bríd Smith	6.8	23,875	25,539					
Direct Democracy	Tom D'Arcy	1.1	4,022						
Direct Democracy	Raymond Whitehead	0.9	3,133						
Independent	Jim Tallon	0.6	2,244						
Fís Nua	Damon Wise	0.3	1,147						
Electorate: 820,668 Valid: 352,575 Spoilt: 6,368 (1.8%) Quota: 88,144 Turnout: 358,943 (43.7%)

=== 2009 election ===
Posters in Upper Leeson Street for candidates in the European and local elections

2009 European Parliament election: Dublin (3 seats)
Party	Candidate	FPv%	Count						
Party	Candidate	FPv%	1	2	3	4	5	6	7
Fine Gael	Gay Mitchell	23.8	96,715	99,098	100,810	104,413			
Labour	Proinsias De Rossa	20.5	83,471	85,217	87,274	94,306	95,636	103,225	
Fianna Fáil	Eoin Ryan	13.6	55,346	56,317	66,205	68,517	69,122	71,530	76,956
Socialist Party	Joe Higgins	12.4	50,510	52,457	53,038	55,116	55,351	60,165	82,366
Sinn Féin	Mary Lou McDonald	11.8	47,928	50,097	50,980	52,447	52,529	55,429	
Green	Déirdre de Búrca	4.7	19,086	20,226	21,991				
Fianna Fáil	Eibhlin Byrne	4.7	18,956	19,448					
Independent	Patricia McKenna	4.3	17,521	21,523	22,380	25,213	25,636		
Libertas	Caroline Simons	3.3	13,514						
Independent	Emmanuel Sweeney	0.9	3,583						
Electorate: 812,465 Valid: 406,630 Spoilt: 6,054 (1.5%) Quota: 101,658 Turnout: 412,684 (50.8%)

=== 2004 election ===
2004 European Parliament election: Dublin (4 seats)
Party	Candidate	FPv%	Count					
Party	Candidate	FPv%	1	2	3	4	5	6
Fine Gael	Gay Mitchell	21.5	90,749					
Fianna Fáil	Eoin Ryan	14.6	61,681	62,939	64,876	65,923	85,810	
Sinn Féin	Mary Lou McDonald	14.3	60,395	60,689	62,030	68,355	72,153	76,543
Labour	Proinsias De Rossa	12.9	54,344	56,243	57,466	62,424	66,570	96,094
Labour	Ivana Bacik	9.7	40,707	41,703	42,624	45,413	47,520	
Green	Patricia McKenna	9.6	40,445	41,506	44,684	49,101	51,892	59,543
Fianna Fáil	Royston Brady	8.6	36,269	36,593	37,423	38,324		
Socialist Party	Joe Higgins	5.5	23,218	23,460	24,541			
Christian Solidarity	Barry Despard	1.3	5,352	5,443				
Independent	Brendan Price	1.1	4,813	4,931				
Independent	Tom Prendeville	0.5	2,071	2,124				
Independent	Paul Doonan	0.4	1,853	1,886				
Electorate: 821,723 Valid: 421,897 Spoilt: 13,239 (3.0%) Quota: 84,380 Turnout: 435,136 (52.9%)

=== 1999 election ===
1999 European Parliament election: Dublin (4 seats)
Party	Candidate	FPv%	Count							
Party	Candidate	FPv%	1	2	3	4	5	6	7	8
Fine Gael	Mary Banotti	20.2	56,593							
Fianna Fáil	Niall Andrews	15.7	44,176	44,731	45,967	46,481	47,931	50,439	71,423	
Green	Patricia McKenna	12.7	35,659	37,988	39,818	43,662	48,299	54,883	56,992	
Labour	Proinsias De Rossa	10.2	28,748	29,522	29,882	31,849	37,820	41,605	43,536	47,018
Fine Gael	Jim Mitchell	9.9	27,873	28,483	30,402	31,296	33,845	34,942	37,051	41,489
Fianna Fáil	Ben Briscoe	8.9	25,065	25,457	26,917	27,322	27,727	29,616		
Sinn Féin	Seán Crowe	6.6	18,633	19,070	19,735	21,147	21,703			
Labour	Bernie Malone	5.7	15,890	16,570	16,982	18,272				
Socialist Party	Joe Higgins	3.8	10,619	11,360	11,697					
Christian Solidarity	Gerard Casey	3.4	9,425	9,867						
Independent	Ciaran Goulding	2.0	5,546							
Independent	Adam Goodwin	0.5	1,438							
Natural Law	John Burns	0.4	1,006							
Electorate: 793,200 Valid: 280,671 Spoilt: 6,013 (2.1%) Quota: 56,135 Turnout: 286,684 (36.1%)

=== 1994 election ===
1994 European Parliament election: Dublin (4 seats)
Party	Candidate	FPv%	Count											
Party	Candidate	FPv%	1	2	3	4	5	6	7	8	9	10	11	12
Green	Patricia McKenna	14.5	40,388	40,928	42,548	45,348	46,058	47,551	49,999	50,879	54,933	57,749		
Fine Gael	Mary Banotti	13.7	38,053	38,160	38,898	38,984	39,857	41,999	42,461	42,965	43,839	46,521	47,032	53,897
Fianna Fáil	Niall Andrews	13.3	36,877	36,935	37,553	38,133	41,272	41,771	42,795	53,466	54,778	56,904		
Fine Gael	Jim Mitchell	10.1	28,116	28,180	28,827	28,981	29,243	30,704	32,199	33,037	35,006	36,037	36,210	42,112
Democratic Left	Pat Rabbitte	8.7	24,133	24,219	24,645	25,206	25,460	26,636	27,054	27,532	31,500	33,677	34,210	
Labour	Bernie Malone	8.1	22,419	22,510	22,878	23,393	24,088	24,813	25,257	26,269	28,748	36,724	37,352	47,696
Labour	Orla Guerin	6.0	16,674	16,765	16,962	17,303	17,977	18,311	18,527	18,929	20,225			
Workers' Party	Tomás Mac Giolla	5.7	15,830	15,965	16,249	17,338	17,547	17,763	18,211	18,579				
Fianna Fáil	John Stafford	4.6	12,811	12,838	13,178	13,661	14,959	15,170	16,349					
Independent	Eamonn Murphy	3.4	9,296	9,385	9,968	10,360	10,431	10,567						
Fianna Fáil	Olive Braiden	3.0	8,237	8,274	8,419	8,573								
Progressive Democrats	Stephen O'Byrnes	3.0	8,212	8,254	8,739	8,828	8,939							
Sinn Féin	Larry O'Toole	3.0	8,190	8,228	8,356									
Independent	Paddy Madigan	2.5	6,903	7,106										
Natural Law	John Burns	0.6	1,705											
Electorate: 755,486 Valid: 277,844 Spoilt: 2,917 (1.0%) Quota: 55,569 Turnout: 280,761 (37.2%)

=== 1989 election ===
1989 European Parliament election: Dublin (4 seats)
Party	Candidate	FPv%	Count					
Party	Candidate	FPv%	1	2	3	4	5	6
Fianna Fáil	Niall Andrews	16.1	72,057	73,032	74,007	76,866	80,010	85,561
Workers' Party	Proinsias De Rossa	15.8	71,041	73,856	74,921	80,475	85,343	97,001
Fianna Fáil	Eileen Lemass	13.0	58,345	59,181	59,892	62,096	65,760	70,917
Labour	Barry Desmond	12.8	57,225	58,185	60,550	64,322	72,096	82,264
Fine Gael	Mary Banotti	11.3	50,666	50,952	66,176	68,973	83,489	93,420
Green	Trevor Sargent	8.3	37,317	39,602	40,767	46,912	51,199	
Progressive Democrats	Mary Harney	8.1	36,402	36,773	40,229	42,371		
Fine Gael	Chris O'Malley	5.9	26,574	26,895				
Independent	Raymond Crotty	5.7	25,525	27,854	28,413			
Sinn Féin	Ann Speed	2.6	11,582					
Independent	Tim Cahill	0.4	1,668					
Electorate: 711,416 Valid: 448,402 Spoilt: 7,137 (1.6%) Quota: 89,681 Turnout: 455,539 (64.0%)

=== 1984 election ===
1984 European Parliament election: Dublin (4 seats)
Party	Candidate	FPv%	Count							
Party	Candidate	FPv%	1	2	3	4	5	6	7	8
Fine Gael	Richie Ryan	16.6	47,014	47,386	47,785	49,572	49,814	53,043	54,432	55,758
Fine Gael	Mary Banotti	15.1	42,660	43,271	44,064	46,654	46,921	50,569	52,559	53,314
Fianna Fáil	Niall Andrews	11.5	32,512	32,692	32,836	33,836	34,639	36,673	38,862	51,945
Fianna Fáil	Eileen Lemass	11.1	31,350	31,483	31,590	31,890	33,011	34,902	36,834	53,903
Fianna Fáil	Jim Tunney	10.8	30,488	30,588	30,641	30,845	31,969	33,492	35,305	
Labour	Frank Cluskey	10.0	28,384	28,846	29,834	30,902	31,984	35,685	47,051	48,454
Workers' Party	Des Geraghty	6.9	19,590	20,080	21,096	21,732	26,135	29,300		
Independent	Seán Dublin Bay Loftus	6.2	17,385	18,498	19,796	21,576	23,295			
Sinn Féin	John Noonan	5.2	14,604	14,730	14,844	14,959				
Independent	Shane Ross	2.9	8,099	8,702	9,605					
Democratic Socialist	John de Courcy Ireland	1.9	5,350	6,122						
Green	Christopher Fettes	1.9	5,242							
Electorate: 704,873 Valid: 282,678 Spoilt: 6,153 (2.1%) Quota: 56,536 Turnout: 288,831 (41.0%)

=== 1979 election ===
1979 European Parliament election: Dublin (4 seats)
Party	Candidate	FPv%	Count									
Party	Candidate	FPv%	1	2	3	4	5	6	7	8	9	10
Fine Gael	Richie Ryan	16.4	48,411	48,434	48,591	48,907	49,279	49,969	55,818	59,642		
Labour	John O'Connell	15.2	44,832	44,896	48,028	48,428	52,880	53,399	54,757	60,855		
Fianna Fáil	Síle de Valera	14.0	41,357	41,439	41,703	45,052	45,638	51,699	52,251	54,838	79,172	
Labour	Michael O'Leary	11.7	34,511	34,548	35,981	36,306	38,353	38,760	39,946	43,598	44,687	47,085
Fine Gael	Nuala Fennell	9.1	26,951	27,032	28,052	28,229	28,679	29,047	34,064	38,980	39,974	42,824
Independent	Seán Dublin Bay Rockall Loftus	7.4	21,769	21,994	22,644	22,870	24,655	25,164	25,991			
Fianna Fáil	Ruairí Brugha	7.4	21,758	21,798	21,876	23,066	23,326	28,403	28,555	30,099		
Fine Gael	Maurice Manning	4.8	14,296	14,326	14,575	14,764	15,142	15,464				
Fianna Fáil	Michael Yeats	4.3	12,715	12,729	12,779	14,402	14,543					
Sinn Féin The Workers' Party	Tomás Mac Giolla	4.0	11,915	11,986	12,444	12,563						
Fianna Fáil	Joe Fox	2.8	8,178	8,199	8,365							
Labour	Jane Dillon Byrne	2.6	7,807	7,968								
Community Democrats	Kevin Clear	0.3	915									
Electorate: 618,454 Valid: 295,415 Spoilt: 8,653 (2.9%) Quota: 59,084 Turnout: 304,068 (49.2%)
