= European Commission Representation in Ireland =

The European Commission Representation in Ireland represents the European Commission in Ireland.

== Leadership ==
Barbara Nolan was head of the EC representation in Ireland. Jonathan Claridge headed the Political Section and Helen Kearns headed the Media Section.
