= John O'Shea (humanitarian) =

Irish NGO executive (born 1944)

- Born: 1944 (age 81–82); Limerick, Ireland
- Education: CBC Monkstown Park
- Alma mater: University College Dublin
- Occupation: NGO executive
- Years active: 1977–present
- Title: Founder & former CEO, GOAL

John O'Shea (born 1944) is the founder and former CEO of GOAL, an Irish non-governmental organization devoted to assisting the poor. His first career was as a sports journalist and GOAL retains links to the sporting community, especially in Ireland.

O'Shea was shortlisted in the top 40 of 2010 RTÉ poll to find Ireland's Greatest person.

== Early life and career ==
O'Shea was born in County Wexford in 1944 and lived in Westport, County Mayo and in Cork. His father, a banker, moved the family to Dublin when he was 11. He was schooled in CBC Monkstown, played rugby at school and was a golfer and tennis player in Monkstown. O'Shea remains a fan of rugby, tennis and golf, playing tennis every Saturday and also giving opinions on Irish sports to radio and newspapers. O'Shea went on to study economics, English and philosophy at University College Dublin and had a career as a sports journalist in the Evening Press for many years after meeting Tim Pat Coogan whilst studying.

== GOAL ==
In 1977, O'Shea began a charitable organisation with a 10,000 punts donation for a feeding project in Calcutta, after which O'Shea founded GOAL. The charity has a sporting backbone. John McEnroe, Pat Cash and Gordon D'Arcy are amongst the sportstars to have become Goalies (volunteers).

GOAL has distributed €790 million and has had over 1,400 volunteers. It has operated in over 50 countries worldwide. O'Shea cites watching the Goalies working around the world as the best part of his years involved in the charity. O'Shea believes that governments of developed countries should be far more involved in the distribution of aid. Speaking on a tribute to his work in GOAL in 2007 on The Late Late Show, O'Shea said:

They were writing cheques and saying "it was nothing to do with us"...To help the poor, you've got to love the poor and this is why governments have failed. They talk about the poor, they issue statements about the poor but you don't get the feeling that Mandela had for his people, because he loved his people. We don't have people of that stature, we don't have people of that moral fibre at the top

— John O'Shea on The Late Late Show

'There is a fire raging - we need someone to put out the fire not hand out chocolate

— Speaking about Live 8 and its failure to tackle corruption in Africa in distributing aid to The Guardian

In 2012, O'Shea was asked to slow down by his doctor. In November 2012, former Fianna Fáil politician, Barry Andrews, was appointed chief executive of GOAL.

== Controversies ==
O'Shea was criticised by some in the INGO community for advocating military invasion and intervention in Sudan by the US, UK and NATO, under the guise of humanitarian intervention.

He was critical of perceived inaction by the UN in humanitarian crisis' in conflict zones and of governmental aid agencies in giving aid directly to allegedly corrupt African governments. John O'Shea has advocated using private companies to provide aid and military forces to directly force aid on countries. Most other Irish Aid agencies disagree stating that every type of aid channels must be used and have described his policies as re-colonisation.

O'Shea's stance was praised by the then Vice Chancellor of the Open University when it awarded him an honorary doctorate, John Naughton stating; "“He [John O’Shea] says openly that Western aid ought not to be channelled to governments that are proven to be either corrupt or brutal – and he is happy to name those regimes. Plain speaking of this order is not usually a way to win friends and influence people. But it has influenced us, which is why we honour him today."

== Recognition ==
In 2008, he was conferred with an honorary doctorate of laws from the University of Notre Dame in recognition of his work.

== Other activities ==
O'Shea gives talks at NUI Galway and interpersonal skills class UCD. He has become involved with the university for a few years where he shares his story. He is an advocate for social (non-profit) entrepreneurs and tries to convince students to go down that path.

== Remuneration ==
The Sunday Independent newspaper reported in 2010 that he drew a then annual salary of €98,320 as acting CEO of GOAL.

Awards
Preceded by (France) Marie-Claire Noah	Arthur Ashe Humanitarian of the Year; 1991	Succeeded by (United States) Arthur Ashe
