= List of addresses to Seanad Éireann =

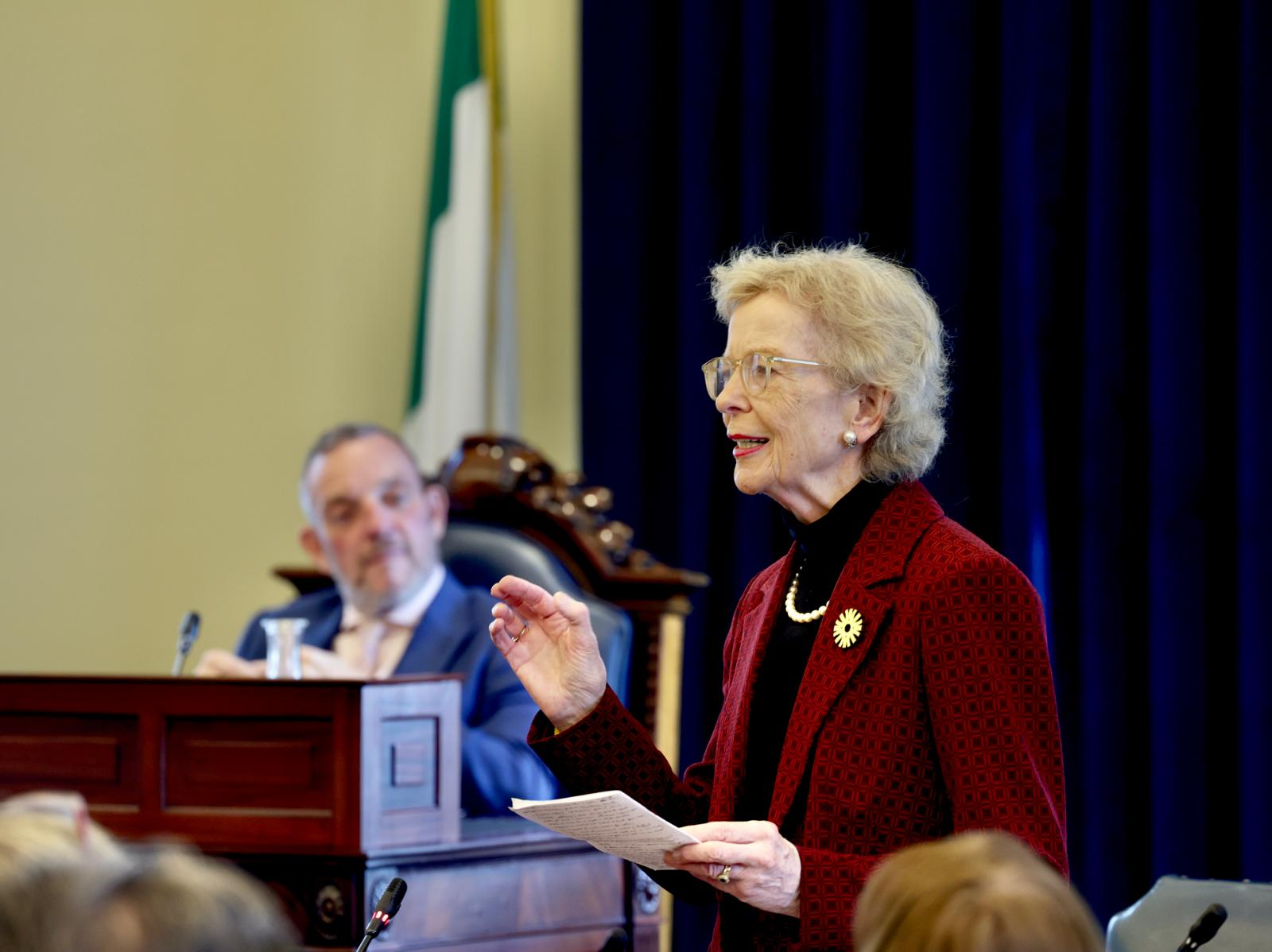
Mary Robinson addressing the Seanad in 2024 as Jerry Buttimer, the Cathaoirleach, looks on.

Seanad Éireann, the upper House of the Oireachtas, has been addressed on occasion by invited non-members. Since 22 May 2001, the Seanad's standing orders allow its Committee on Procedure and Privilege (CPP) to approve the attendance of an Irish Member of the European Parliament (MEP) in the house. (Currently S.O.57; originally S.O.52A, and later S.O.56.) In July 2011, S.O.57 was extended to "representatives and persons in public and civic life". Separately, the CPP can recommend inviting "Distinguished Persons" to address the house; since the late 1990s this has been extended, typically to EU officials.

Senators have also been present alongside TDs at joint sessions of the Seanad and Dáil Éireann, the lower house of the Oireachtas: see list of addresses to the Oireachtas.

Date (link to text)	Seanad	Speaker	Role	Country / Institution	Notes
28 March 1996	(20th)	James Dooge	Member of the Institute of European Affairs	Ireland	Former professor, Minister for Foreign Affairs and Cathaoirleach.
29 October 1996	(20th)	Neil Kinnock	Commissioner for Transport	European Commission (Santer)	
19 November 1998	(21st)	Jacques Santer	President	European Commission (Santer)	
14 November 2001	(21st)	David Byrne	Commissioner for Health and Consumer Policy	European Commission (Prodi)	
10 October 2002	(22nd)	Pat Cox	President	European Parliament	
13 November 2003	(22nd)	Mary Banotti	MEP for Dublin	Ireland	Invited under S.O.52A
26 November 2003	(22nd)	Joe McCartin	MEP for Connacht–Ulster	Ireland	Invited under S.O.52A
27 November 2003	(22nd)	Pat Cox	President	European Parliament	Cox was invited as a Distinguished Person, rather than as an MEP under S.O.52A.
27 November 2003	(22nd)	Dana Rosemary Scallon	MEP for Connacht–Ulster	Ireland	Invited under S.O.52A
27 November 2003	(22nd)	Nuala Ahern	MEP for Leinster	Ireland	Invited under S.O.52A
27 November 2003	(22nd)	Seán Ó Neachtain	MEP for Connacht–Ulster	Ireland	Invited under S.O.52A
11 December 2003	(22nd)	Avril Doyle	MEP for Leinster	Ireland	Invited under S.O.52A
11 December 2003	(22nd)	Brian Crowley	MEP for Munster	Ireland	Invited under S.O.52A
3 March 2004	(22nd)	John Hume	MEP for Northern Ireland	European Parliament	
8 November 2006	(22nd)	John Bruton	Ambassador to the United States	European Union	Former Taoiseach
8 April 2008	(23rd)	Hans-Gert Pöttering	President	European Parliament	
12 July 2011	(24th)	Jerzy Buzek	President	European Parliament	
28 September 2011	(24th)	Maurice Manning	President of the Irish Human Rights Commission	Ireland	Invited under S.O.57(2). Chair of the European Group of National Human Rights Institutions; Chancellor of the National University of Ireland; Former Leader of the Seanad
24 November 2011	(24th)	Mary Robinson	President of the Mary Robinson Foundation – Climate Justice	Ireland	Invited under S.O.57(2). Former Senator, President of Ireland, and United Nations High Commissioner for Human Rights. Address on "the importance of the Seanad in her career as a human rights activist".
3 July 2012	(24th)	Drew Nelson	Grand secretary	Grand Orange Lodge of Ireland	Invited under S.O.57(2).
8 November 2012	(24th)	Christopher Pissarides	Professor of Economics	London School of Economics	Address on the topic "Youth Unemployment and Public Policy". Co-laureate of 2010 Nobel Memorial Prize in Economic Sciences.
24 January 2013	(24th)	Gay Mitchell	MEP for Dublin	Ireland	Invited under S.O.57(2)
29 January 2013	(24th)	Mairead McGuinness	MEP for East	Ireland	Invited under S.O.57(2).
13 February 2013	(24th)	Phil Prendergast	MEP for South	Ireland	Invited under S.O.57(2).
28 February 2013	(24th)	Emer Costello	MEP for Dublin	Ireland	Invited under S.O.57(2).
25 April 2013	(24th)	Pat The Cope Gallagher	MEP for North-West	Ireland	Invited under S.O.57(2).
30 April 2013	(24th)	Seán Kelly	MEP for South	Ireland	Invited under S.O.57(2).
1 May 2013	(24th)	Nessa Childers	MEP for East	Ireland	Invited under S.O.57(2).
2 May 2013	(24th)	Marian Harkin	MEP for North-West	Ireland	Invited under S.O.57(2).
8 May 2013	(24th)	Máire Geoghegan-Quinn	Commissioner for Research, Innovation and Science	European Commission (Barroso II)	
16 May 2013	(24th)	Jim Higgins	MEP for North-West	Ireland	Invited under S.O.57(2).
29 May 2013	(24th)	Margareta Wahlström	Special Representative and head of UN International Strategy for Disaster Reduction	United Nations	Invited under S.O.57(2).
25 September 2013	(24th)	David Begg	General Secretary	Irish Congress of Trade Unions	Invited under S.O.57(2).
16 January 2014	(24th)	Tom Arnold	Chairperson	Constitutional Convention	Invited under S.O.57(2).
12 June 2014	(24th)	Anne Brasseur	President	Parliamentary Assembly of the Council of Europe	Invited as a "Distinguished Person".
19 June 2014	(24th)	Catherine McGuinness	Chairperson of the external assessment panel	Children's Rights Alliance report card	Invited under S.O.57(2). Former Supreme Court justice and president of the Law Reform Commission. Address on "children's rights in Ireland".
23 June 2015	(24th)	Phil Hogan	Commissioner for Agriculture and Rural Development	European Commission (Juncker)	Invited as a "Distinguished Person".
5 October 2016	(25th)	Manus Cooney	Advocate of amnesty for Irish illegal immigrants in the United States	United States	Address instigated by Billy Lawless. Topic was "undocumented Irish and immigration reform". Invited under S.O.57(2).
29 November 2016	(25th)	Nicola Sturgeon	First Minister	Scottish Government	Invited as a "Distinguished Person".
21 March 2018	(25th)	Mícheál Ó Muircheartaigh	Sports broadcaster	Ireland	Invited under S.O.57(2). The address, to mark Bliain na Gaeilge ("the Year of Irish") was mainly in Irish and partly in English. Responses from senators also mixed the two languages.
26 April 2018	(25th)	Phil Hogan	Commissioner for Agriculture and Rural Development	European Commission (Juncker)	Invited as a "Distinguished Person".
8 November 2018	(25th)	Deirdre Hargey	Lord Mayor	Belfast	Invited under S.O.57(2).
29 January 2019	(25th)	John Horan	President	Gaelic Athletic Association	Invited under S.O.57(2). After Horan's initial address, Senators made comments and questions, with Horan giving a final speech in response.
22 September 2021	(26th)	Colm Markey, Maria Walsh	MEP for Midlands–North-West	Ireland	Invited under S.O.57(1). Luke 'Ming' Flanagan and Chris MacManus were invited but could not attend.
2 November 2021	(26th)	Barry Andrews, Ciarán Cuffe, Clare Daly, Frances Fitzgerald	MEPs for Dublin	Ireland	Invited under S.O.57(1).
18 November 2021	(26th)	Micheál Martin	Taoiseach	Ireland	Invited "notwithstanding anything in Standing Orders".
23 February 2022	(26th)	Billy Kelleher, Grace O'Sullivan, Seán Kelly	MEPs for South	Ireland	Invited under S.O.57(1). Deirdre Clune and Mick Wallace were invited but did not attend.
3 March 2022	(26th)	Linda Ervine	Irish language in Northern Ireland activist	Turas	Invited under S.O.57(2). To mark Seachtain na Gaeilge.
24 May 2022	(26th)	Richard Neal	Chairman of Congressional Friends of Ireland	United States	Invited as a "Distinguished Person".
14 June 2022	(26th)	Lesia Vasylenko, Alyona Shkrum, Rostyslav Tistyk, Dmytro Natalukha	Verkhovna Rada members	Ukraine	Invited as "Distinguished Persons". In solidarity after the Russian invasion of Ukraine.
20 September 2022	(26th)	Barry Andrews, Ciarán Cuffe, Frances Fitzgerald	MEPs for Dublin	Ireland	Invited under S.O.57(1). Clare Daly sent apologies.
5 October 2022	(26th)	John, Baron McFall	Lord Speaker of the House of Lords	United Kingdom	Invited as a "Distinguished Person".
26 April 2023	(26th)	Larry McCarthy	President	Gaelic Athletic Association	Invited under S.O.57(2).
9 May 2023	(26th)	Mairead McGuinness	Commissioner for Financial Stability, Financial Services and the Capital Markets Union	European Commission (von der Leyen)	Invited under S.O.57(2). Marking Europe Day
23 May 2023	(26th)	Bertie Ahern	Former Taoiseach	Ireland	Invited as a "Distinguished Person". Marking the 25th anniversary of the Good Friday Agreement signed by Ahern.
13 June 2023	(26th)	Annita Demetriou	President of the House of Representatives	Cyprus	Invited as a "Distinguished Person".
27 June 2023	(26th)	Maura Healey	Governor of the Commonwealth of Massachusetts	United States	Invited as a "Distinguished Person".
12 June 2024	(26th)	Mary Robinson	Former President. (Note: "Former President" was the designation in the motion of invitation and title of the Seanad record of the address. Introducing her address, the Cathaoirleach also mentioned her time as Senator, UN High Commissioner for Human Rights, and co-founder of The Elders.)	Ireland	Invited as a "Distinguished Person". Address on the "climate crisis".

== See also ==
- List of addresses to the Oireachtas, includes joint sessions and Dáil addresses at which Seanad members were present.
