= Statue of Queen Victoria, Sydney =

Statue in New South Wales, Australia

Statue of Queen Victoria
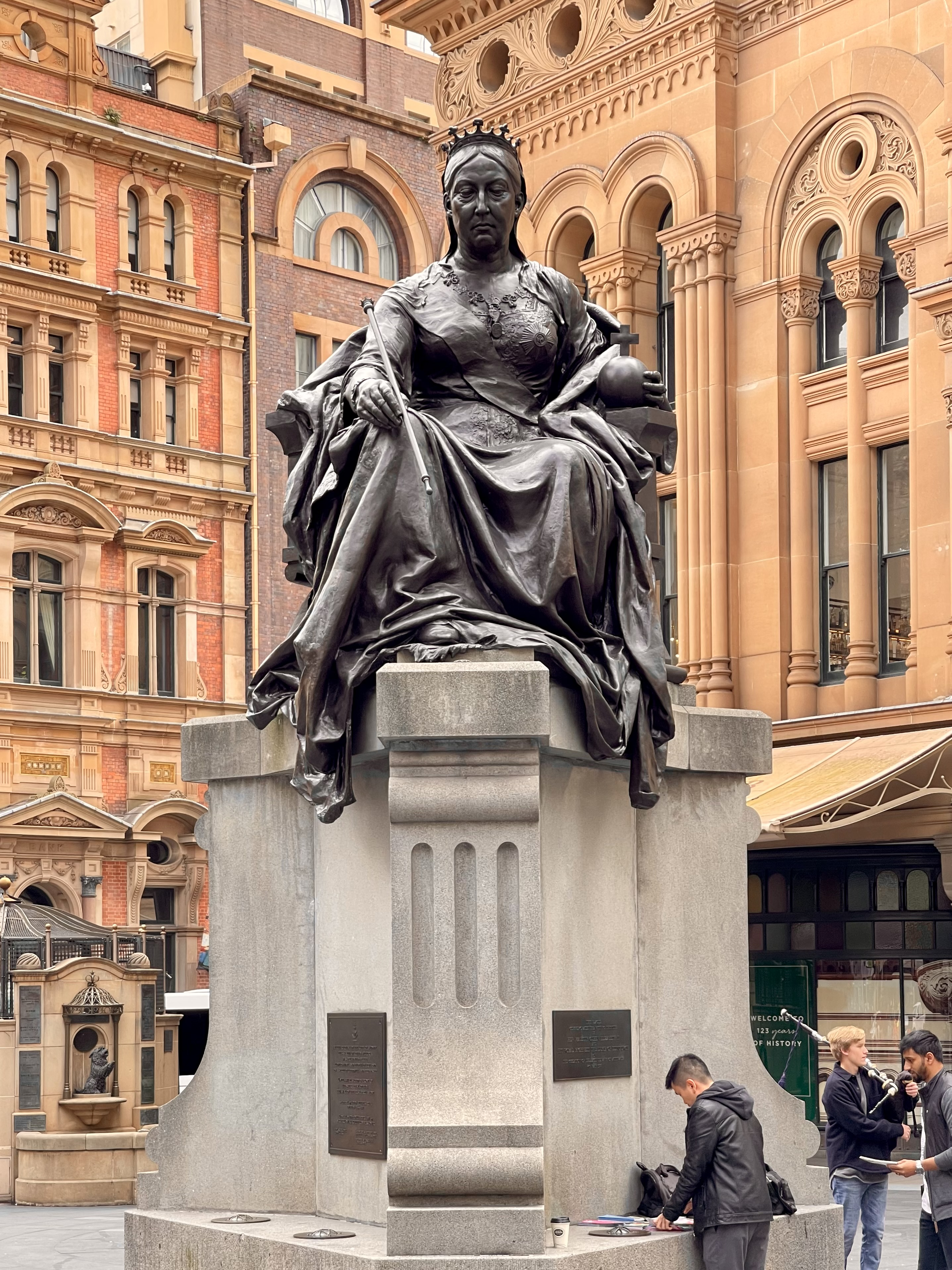
- The monument in 2021
- Artist: John Hughes
- Completion date: 15 February 1908; 118 years ago
- Type: Bronze statue on sandstone plinth
- Dimensions: 3 m (9.8 ft)
- Location: Sydney, Australia; 33°52′21.8217″S 151°12′24.5185″E

The seated Statue of Queen Victoria now in Sydney, New South Wales, Australia, was sculpted by John Hughes in 1908 and was originally located in Dublin, Ireland while it was still part of the United Kingdom. It was the last royal statue to have been erected in Ireland. Made of bronze, it is now situated on the corner of Druitt and George Street in front of the Queen Victoria Building, Sydney.

A standing bronze statue of Queen Victoria is located nearby, on Queen's Square.

== History ==
=== Commission ===
The Diamond Jubilee of Queen Victoria in 1897 (which had been celebrated with "great acclaim" in Dublin), and her tour of Ireland in April 1900, prompted the Royal Dublin Society to propose a national monument to her. Her death nine months later spurred a second burst of enthusiasm. The state, which owned the courtyard in front of Leinster House, donated the site for the purpose. John Hughes, instructor in Modelling at the Dublin Metropolitan School of Art, was commissioned to create the statue and, resigning his teaching position, moved his studio to Paris to cast the work. It was his most important commission to date.

=== Unveiling in Dublin ===
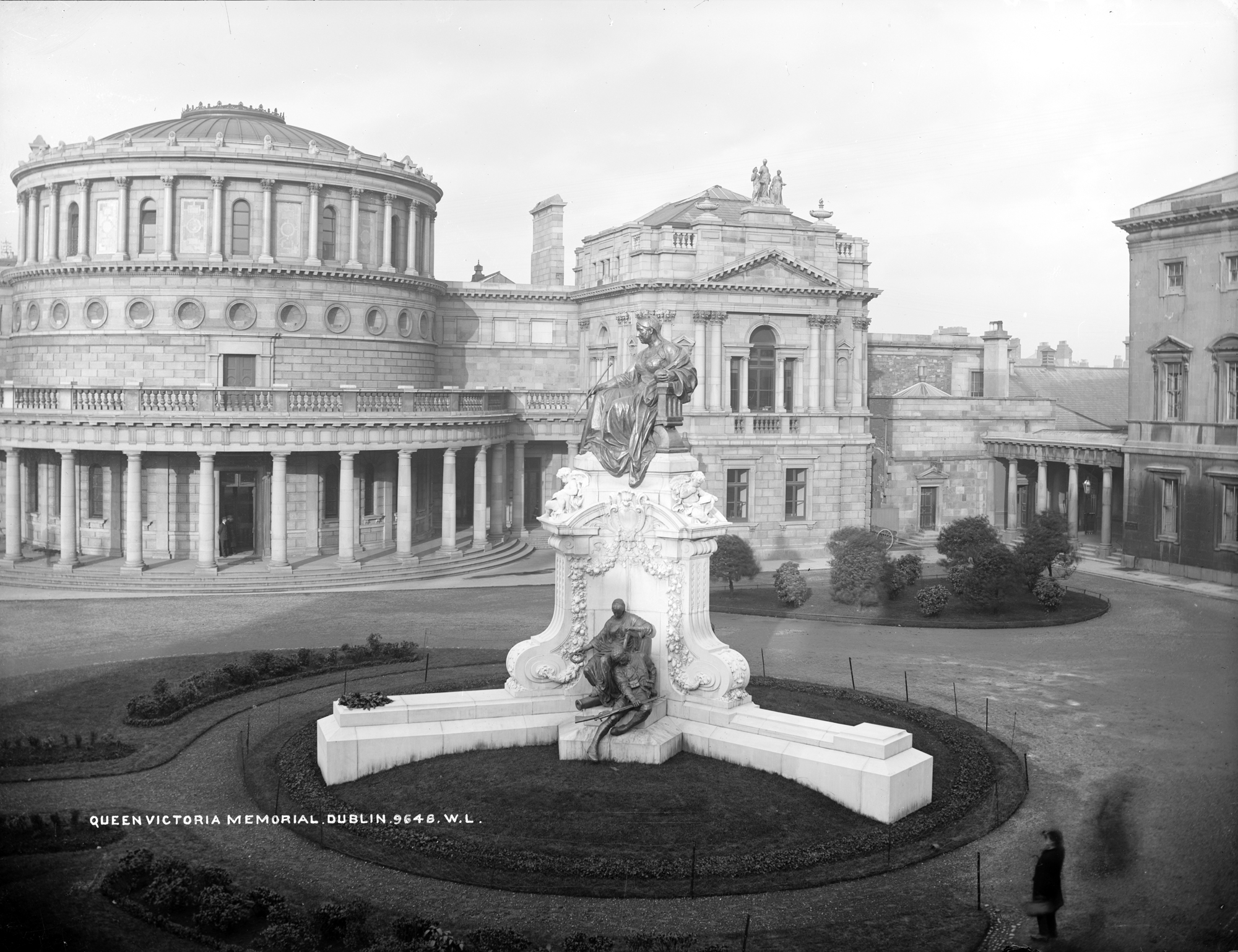
The statue in its original location in Dublin c.1908, with the National Library of Ireland in the background

Almost a decade later, it was unveiled in Dublin, Ireland, in the enclosed courtyard of Leinster House on 15 February 1908. At a ceremony with 1,000 troops on parade, and massed bands, Lord Aberdeen, the Lord Lieutenant of Ireland declared "we are assembled here to dedicate this noble work of art to the perpetual commemoration of a great personality and a great life." The unveiling ceremony was an occasion for ideological statement, and the speeches delivered linked the memorial to the Irishmen who had fought in the Boer War, "where the Royal Dublin Fusiliers and the Connaught Rangers had distinguished themselves."

=== Composition ===
The City of Sydney website notes that "She wears a gown that falls in graceful folds over the top of the pedestal at the front, and a cloak that falls over the back. In her right hand she holds a sceptre."

Irish art historian John Turpin writes that the Queen Victoria memorial was "a combination of world-wide imperialist celebration, affirmation of Irish unionism and war memorial to fallen Irish soldiers carrying all the emotion that a war memorial attracted." Peter Moore's entry in the Dictionary of Sydney notes:

The statue shows an effort to portray Victoria Regina as the 'Irish Queen' rather than the 'British Sovereign'. She is seated in a low chair rather than an elaborate throne, allowing the artist to contain the figure within a sphere rather than as a towering pillar. (Other seated examples place her on a high throne.) And she wears a simple coronet rather than the royal or imperial crown... Moreover, the statue portrayed her as the Sovereign Head of the Most Illustrious Order of St Patrick, Ireland's order of chivalry dating from 1783. The star on her left breast, and the pendant badge, feature shamrocks, crowned harps, and St Patrick's Cross. The St Patrick reference probably backfired. It confirmed Ireland's colonial subordination. Round her neck the chain alternates the red and white roses of England.

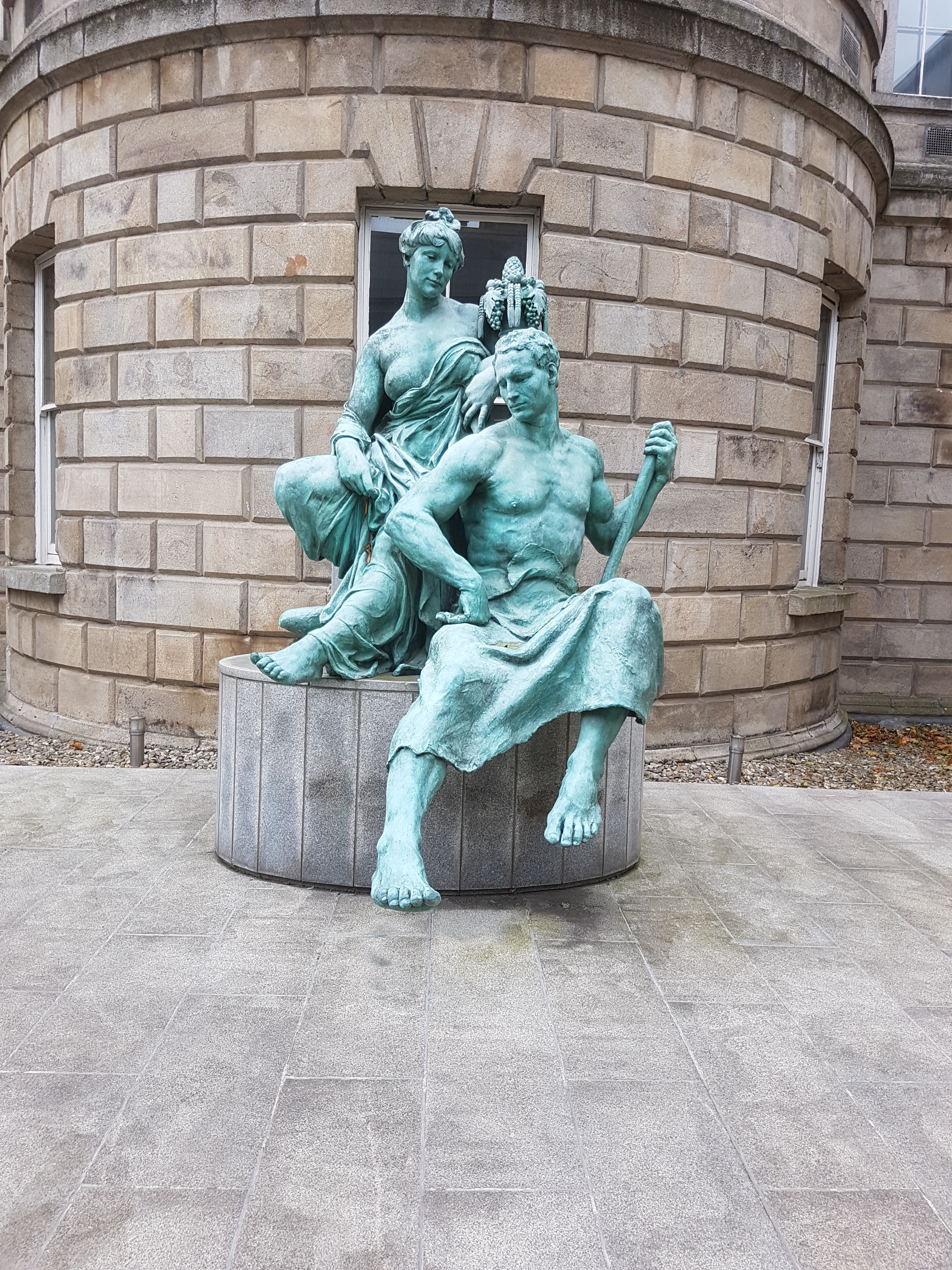
Two sculptures which initially sat at the base of the statue, and remain at Leinster House

The statue sat atop a portland stone column, also designed by Hughes, with three sculptural groups to be placed below – "Fame", "Hibernia at Peace" and "Hibernia at War". This last group was also known as "Erin and the Dying Soldier" and referred to the loyalty demonstrated by Irish soldiers in the Boer War. A 1997 article by Turpin in The Irish Review described the composition of the monument:

As you approached the completed monument from the entrance gates in Kildare Street, the right-hand face displayed a dead Irish soldier being presented with a laurel crown by Erin while on the left two bronze figures represented Peace; at the back, facing Leinster House, sat a bronze of Fame. In addition, three small figures in stone underneath the Queen represented Science, Literature and Art. In its elaborately naturalistic bronze figures and florid stone carvings it was a perfect example of French Belle Epoque sculpture, comparable to the grandest rhetorical Parisian monuments of the day.

=== Status following Irish Independence ===
In 1922, 14 years after the statue's installation, Leinster House had become the seat of the Irish parliament, the Oireachtas, and nationalistic sentiment disapproved of having a British queen celebrated in such a location. According to Turpin, the memorial became an "embarrassment in the new state, and was a constant and unwelcome reminder of Ireland's former links with Britain to the members of Dáil Éireann" (Ireland's assembly), who passed it on their way in to the building every day. The statue had by now been given the nickname "the auld bitch" by Irish writer James Joyce. In August 1929, The Irish Times reported that discussions were under way to remove the statue "on the basis that its continued presence there is repugnant to national feeling, and that, from an artistic point of view, it disfigures the architectural beauty of the parliamentary buildings."

External videos
- "Queen Turns Green At Royal Hospital" – report for Newsbeat by Cathal O'Shannon, RTÉ Television (13 January 1967).

=== Storage in Ireland ===
It was removed from its original location in 1947 (other sources state July 1948) and replaced with a carpark. It was transported by lorry to the Royal Hospital Kilmainham and, along with the associated three sculptural groups, was placed in a courtyard and left there, where it developed a patina. The hospital had also been a proposed site for the parliament, and was used as a storage location for property belonging to the National Museum of Ireland. It is now the Irish Museum of Modern Art. Attempts to send the sculpture to London, Ontario did not succeed as neither the Canadian nor Irish governments wished to pay the cost of transport. In February 1980, the statue was transferred to a yard behind a disused children's reformatory at Daingean, County Offaly.

==== Three supporting bronzes ====
In 1990, the three supporting bronzes were relocated onto the roof garden of the new conference centre at Dublin Castle, and remained there as of 1997. The associated sculptures from the base of the statue remained in the collection of Dublin Castle as of 2012.

=== Desire for a statue in Sydney ===
In the mid-1980s, the Queen Victoria Building in central Sydney was undergoing major renovations after decades of disuse, and the developers Ipoh Gardens "decided in consultation with Council that an exterior sculpture of Queen Victoria would be an appropriate addition to the building." The search for a suitable statue of Victoria began in 1983, and saw project manager Neil Glasser travelling to several former British colonies including India, Pakistan, South Yemen and Turkey in search of an appropriate sculpture. Although Glasser encountered "hundreds of suitable statues", he experienced a "general reluctance" in each country to part with their statues of the former Queen.

In late 1985, after a "considerable amount of sleuthing", the statue, sitting in long grass behind the reformatory in Daingean, Ireland, was discovered by Glasser and proposed to be moved to Australia. Following negotiations, which included discussions at Cabinet level, Ireland became the only country prepared to part with its statue. In order to obtain approval, Glasser contacted John Teahan, the Director of the National Museum of Ireland, and Sydney's Lord Mayor contacted the Irish Ambassador in Canberra. It was subsequently presented to the City of Sydney as a gesture of goodwill on behalf of the Irish Government and people, on a "loan until recalled" basis.

==== Transport to Australia ====
In August 1986, Taoiseach (Prime Minister of Ireland) Garret FitzGerald, authorised that the statue be given to Australia "on loan until recalled". Subsequently, declassified cabinet papers showed that the plan was opposed by the then-finance minister John Bruton (later to be Taoiseach), as well as Teahan, on the basis that it represented the work of an Irish artist and "...representative of one of the many traditions of Irish history".

Due to its weight and size, the statue was transported by sea to Australia. The irony of the British Queen being "transported" to Australia by ship was not lost on the Irish media. The statue arrived in Sydney in November 1986, whereupon it underwent "a few minor renovations" after the 43 years since it had last been on display.

=== Unveiling in Australia ===
An unveiling ceremony took place in Sydney on Sunday 20 December 1987 overseen by Eric Neal, Chief Commissioner of Sydney, and Dermot Brangan, first secretary at the Irish embassy to Australia. The statue was given a tall, triangular sandstone plinth on which to rest. In the days before the unveiling the embassy and the Daily Telegraph newspaper received anonymous threats of violence and protest about "the propriety of an Irish government giving a statue of Victoria as a gift."

Art historian Paula Murphy reflected on the episode in a 1993 paper for the Irish Arts Review Yearbook:

...the Victoria monument was dismantled in 1948. Initially stripped of majestic decorum, the bronze statue of the queen languished in storage at the Royal Hospital Kilmainham, and was subsequently donated to the Australians, and unveiled in Sydney in 1987. Queen Victoria sits once more on a pedestal, if a lesser one than her original perch, while, ironically, the figures of Erin and the Irish soldier lie discarded in the tall grass on the premises of the National Museum overflow building at Daingean.

==== Skye Terrier statue ====
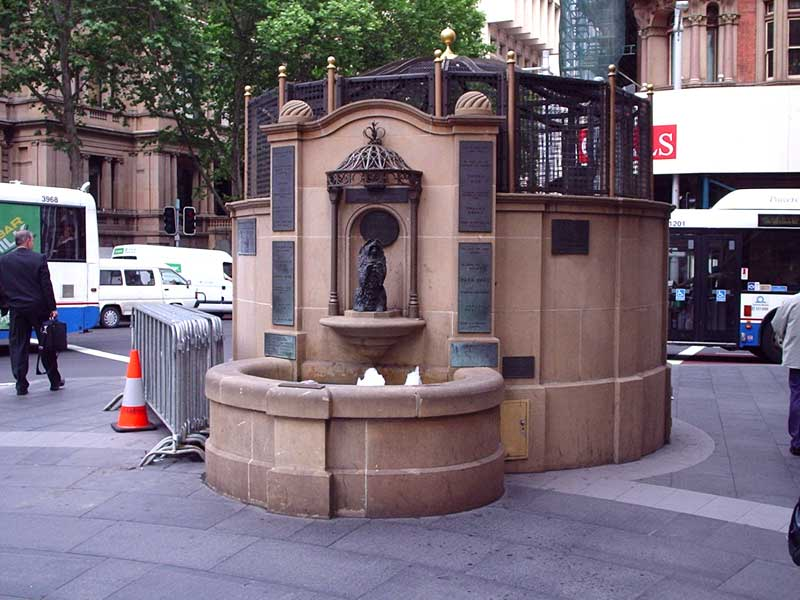
The small sculpture of "Islay" disguising the ventilation shaft

A second statue nearby is of the Queen's favourite pet, a Skye Terrier named "Islay", begging above a wishing well on behalf of the Royal Institute for Deaf and Blind Children. At a cost of $10,000, Sydney sculptor Justin Robson modelled the bronze work from an 1843 sketch by the Queen. The location of the statue is actually to disguise the ventilation shaft for the new carpark underneath the renovated building.

The wishing well also includes "a poem telling the story of Islay which will be specially translated into Braille, four proverbs highlighting the morality of giving in six different languages, and a piece of stone from Blarney Castle, Ireland." Since 1998, a recorded request for donations, supposedly being "spoken" by Islay, has been played at regular intervals from hidden loudspeakers. The recording says, "Because of the many good deeds I've done for deaf and blind children, I have been given the power of speech", and then expresses thanks for donations. It is voiced by local radio personality John Laws and concludes with two barks, also by Laws.

== Inscription ==
A plaque at the front of the pedestal reads:

At the request of the City of Sydney, this statue was presented by the Government and people of Ireland in a spirit of Goodwill and Friendship. Until 1947 it stood in front of Leinster House Dublin, the seat of the Irish Parliament.
Sculptured by John Hughes RHA Dublin 1865-1941
Unveiled on 20th December 1987 by Sir Eric Neal, Chief Commissioner; L.P. Carter O.B.E. Town Clerk; Sir Nicholas Sheadie O.B.E. Deputy Chief Commissioner; M. Norman Oakes A.O. Commissioner.

== Gallery ==
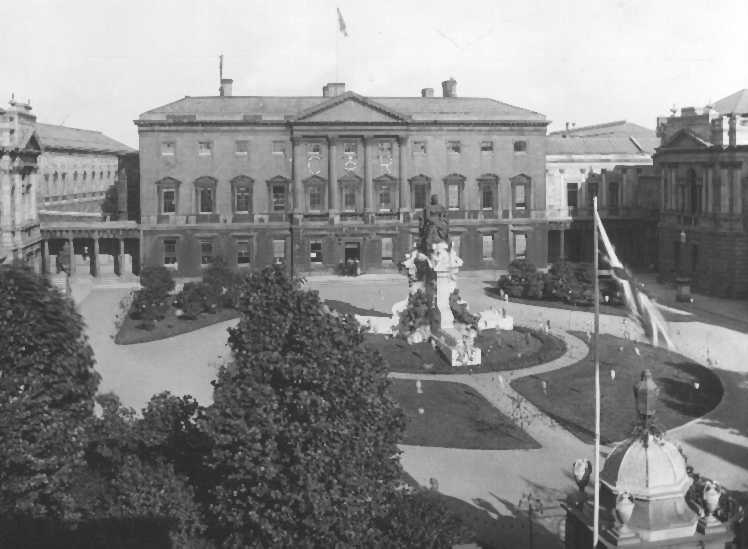
The monument as seen from Kildare Street in 1911

Photograph taken by American businessman Edmund F. Arras during a 1913 tour of Europe

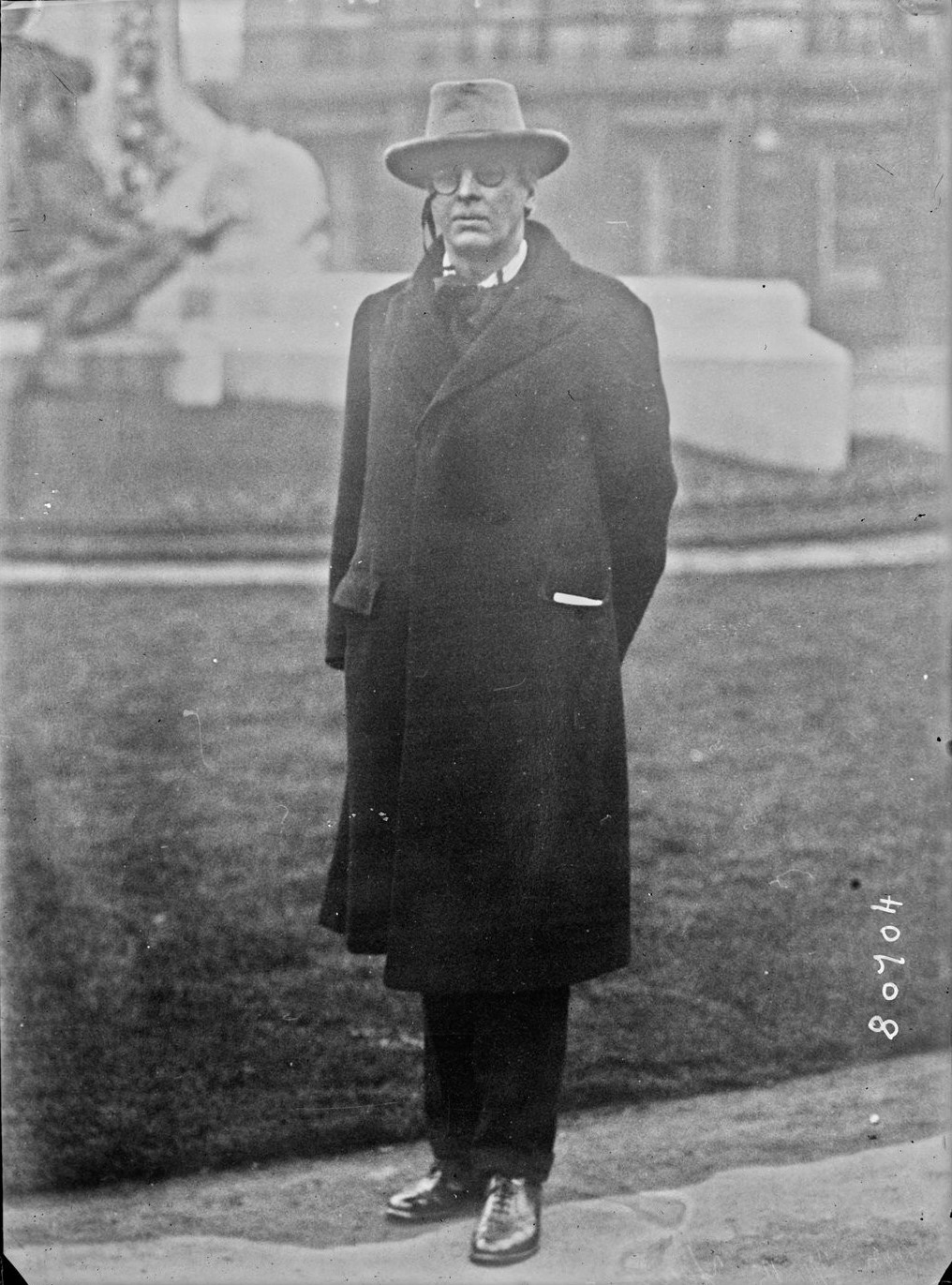
Poet W. B. Yeats in front of the monument in Dublin in 1922

The statue in Sydney circa.1987

The statue in Sydney in 2012

The statue in 2021

== See also ==
- Cloud Arch, a major proposed sculpture to be placed nearby
- List of statues of Queen Victoria
- A statue of Queen Victoria at University College Cork, Ireland, which was erected in 1849 and remains onsite
- A drinking fountain commemorating Queen Victoria's Diamond Jubilee, which was erected in Clones, County Monaghan in 1897 and accidentally damaged in 1965
