= Governor-General's Address to Dáil Éireann =

In the Irish Free State, the Governor-General's Address or Governor-General's Speech was a formal address delivered by the Governor-General to Dáil Éireann, modelled on the speech from the throne given in other Dominions of the British Commonwealth. The address was written by the Executive Council and outlined the bills it intended to introduce. Technically the address was only to the Dáil, not to a joint session of both Houses of the Oireachtas. However, members of Seanad Éireann were invited into the Dáil chamber to attend the address, and subsequently discussed it after returning to their own chamber.

The address was a brief, businesslike event, lacking the pomp and ceremony of the State Opening of Parliament. This reflected the general lack of enthusiasm for monarchy in the Irish Free State. Only the first two sessions of the Free State Oireachtas, in 1922 and 1923, had such an address. Whereas in the British Parliament bills do not persist from one session to the next, the Free State Oireachtas allowed pending bills to carry over from the previous session. Thus the beginning of a new session did not correspond with the introduction of a completely new slate of legislation.

== The first Address: December 1922 ==
The first address was delivered by the newly appointed Governor-General, Timothy Michael Healy, on 12 December 1922, six days after the coming into existence of the Irish Free State. Unlike other examples internationally the speech itself was delivered not to the upper house but to the lower house, Dáil Éireann, and involved no ceremony. Members of Seanad Éireann, at the invitation of the Ceann Comhairle, assembled in the Dáil chamber to witness the Speech. Labour Party members boycotted the speech.

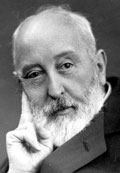
Governor-General Timothy Michael Healy Healy was the only governor-general required to give the Governor-General's Address to the Oireachtas.

The Governor-General began by reading a message sent by King George V which read:

With the final Enactment of the Constitution the self-governing Dominion of the Irish Free State comes into being.

The Constitution is itself founded on the Treaty that was framed a year ago between the Representatives of Great Britain and of Ireland.

It is my earnest hope that by the faithful observance on all sides of the Pact so concluded the peace and prosperity of Ireland may be secured. It is in the spirit of that Settlement that I have chosen you to be the first Representative of the Crown in the Irish Free State.

With all my heart I pray that the blessing of God may rest upon you and upon the Ministers of the Irish Free State in the difficult task committed to your charge.

In the Speech itself, which was written by the Executive Council, the Governor-General told members of the creation of the Boundary Commission.

The Parliament of that portion of the Province of Ulster called Northern Ireland, taking advantage of Article 12 of the Treaty between Great Britain and Ireland, has seen fit to present an address to His Majesty, by the effect of which the powers of your Parliament and Government have ceased to extend to Northern Ireland. Accordingly it becomes the duty now of my Government to take such steps as may be necessary for constituting the Commission which is to determine in accordance with the wishes of the inhabitants, so far as may be compatible with economic and geographic conditions, the boundaries between Northern Ireland and the rest of Ireland.

Members were also informed of forthcoming legislation that would deal with the implementation of the Irish Free State Constitution, the creation of a new judiciary, reform of the Poor Law, the creation in law of the Civil Guards (later named the Garda Síochána) and other legal reforms.

After its conclusion, a motion of thanks was proposed in each House for the Governor-General's Speech. The Houses then debated in detail the full contents of the speech.

== The second Address: October 1923 ==
The second Governor-General's Address was delivered in the Dáil on 3 October 1923, shortly after the Oireachtas reconvened after the 27 August general election. The text had been distributed in advance. Its contents were discussed in detail in subsequent weeks in both Houses.

No further Governor-General's Addresses were ever given.

== See also ==
- List of addresses to the Oireachtas
