= List of addresses to the Oireachtas =

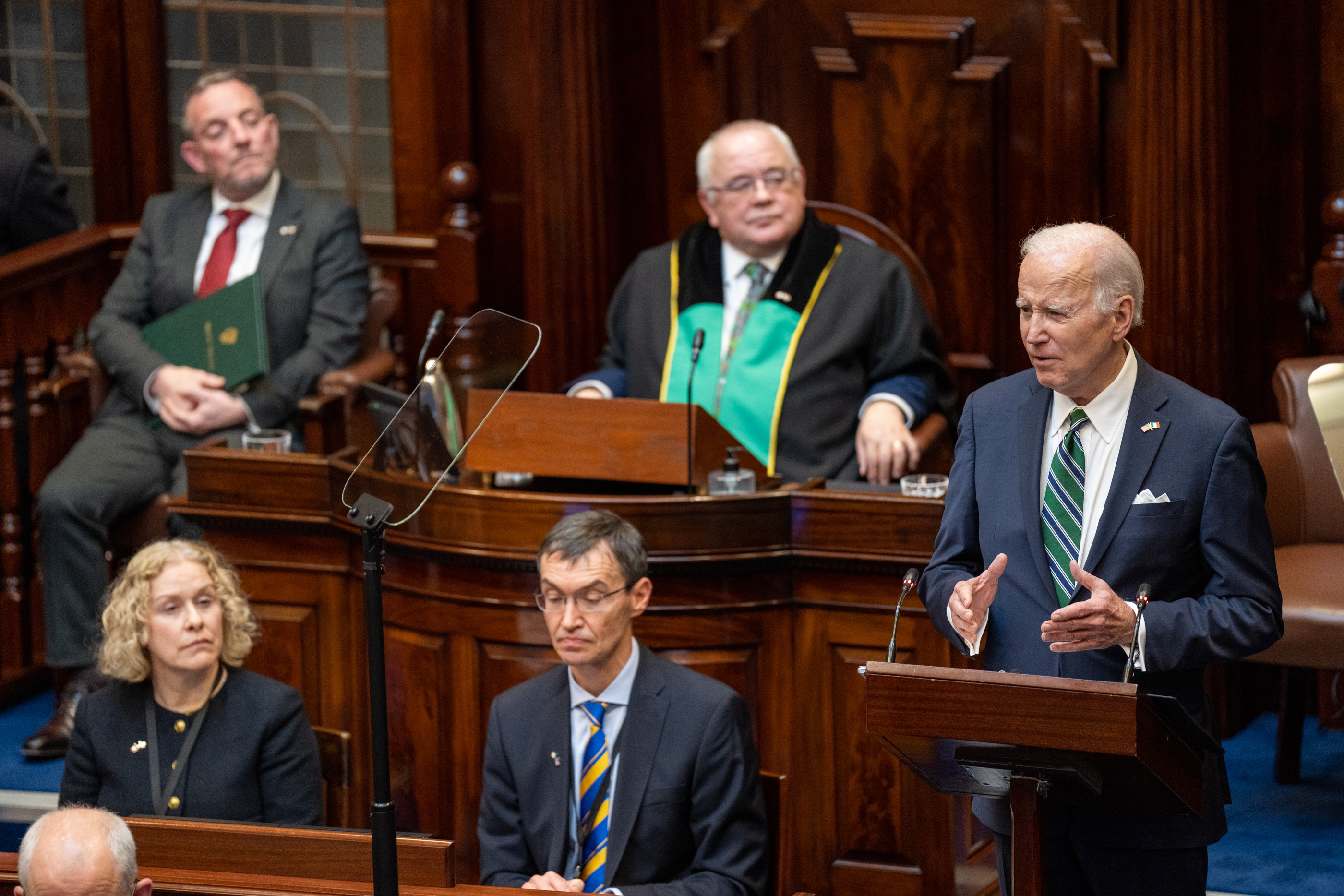
Joe Biden, the US President, addressing a joint sitting in 2023. Seán Ó Fearghaíl, the Ceann Comhairle, presides, with Jerry Buttimer, the Cathaoirleach, seated to the left.

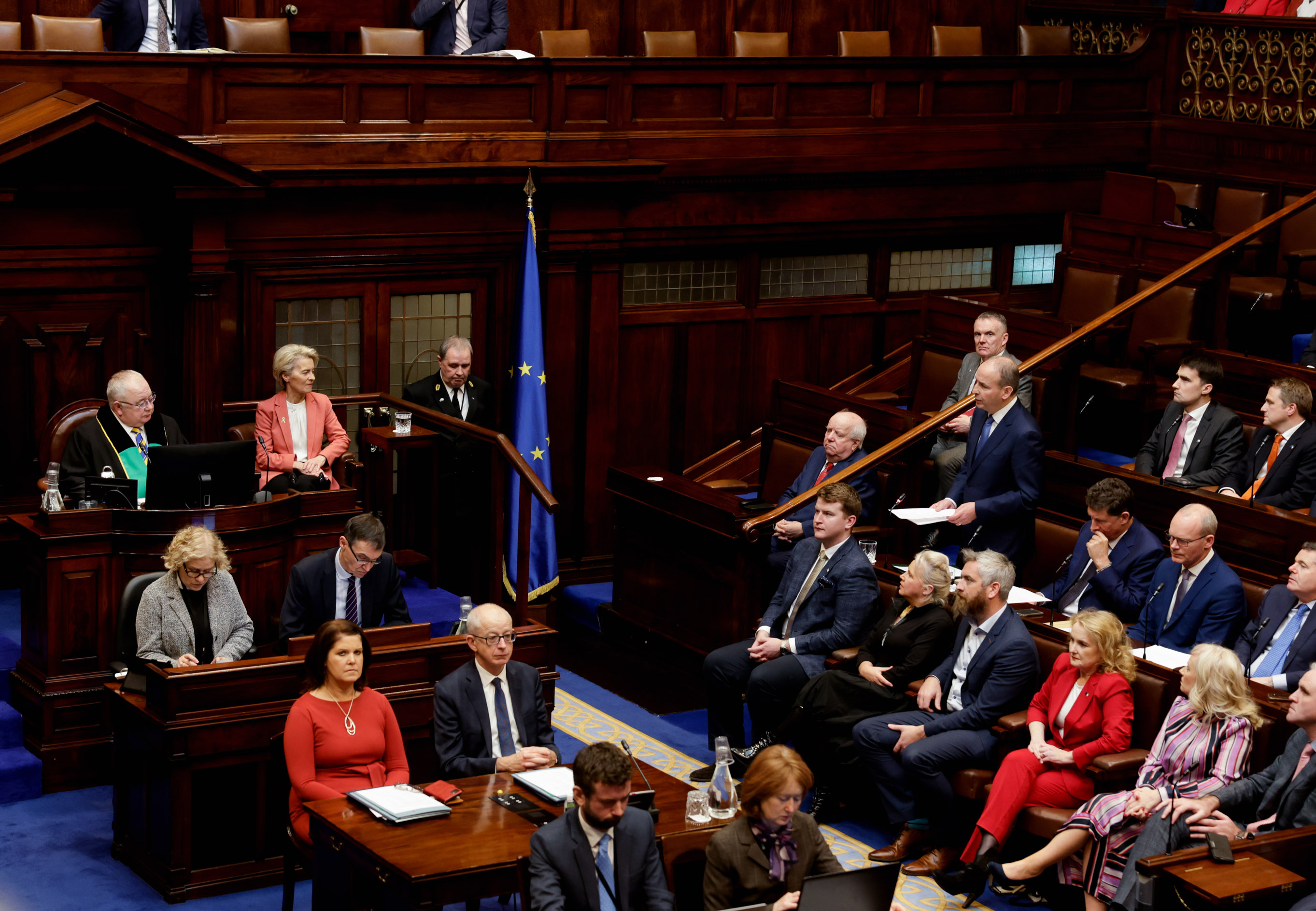
Micheál Martin, the Taoiseach, responds to the 2022 address by Ursula von der Leyen, the President of the European Commission. Senators occupy the usually empty seats in front of the front bench.

Several distinguished leaders have addressed a joint session of Dáil Éireann and Seanad Éireann, the two houses of the Oireachtas or parliament of Ireland. The President of Ireland is entitled to make such an address under Article 13.7.1° of the Constitution. Tim Healy, the first Governor-General of the Irish Free State, made addresses in 1922 and 1923 modelled on the British speech from the throne. Several foreign leaders have been honoured with an invitation to address the Oireachtas, typically during a state visit. The Official Report of Dáil and Seanad proceedings takes special care when recording such events and the transcript of speeches may be supplemented with description of ancillary actions. A few leaders have also addressed Dáil Éireann sitting alone; those are also listed below. The standing orders of Seanad Éireann more readily allow addresses by non-members: see the list of addresses to Seanad Éireann.

Date	Assembly	Speaker	Role	Country / Institution	Notes
9 May 1919	Dáil (1st)	Frank P. Walsh, Edward Fitzsimmons Dunne, Michael J. Ryan	American Commission on Irish Independence members	United States	All three members spoke in turn.
10 January 1922	Dáil (2nd)	Thomas Johnson	Leader of the Labour Party	Ireland	A labour delegation was received on the floor of the Dáil, led by Johnson and also including Cathal O'Shannon, Thomas Foran, J. T. O'Farrell, Denis Cullen, George Nason, James Carr, and Luke Larkin. After Johnson's speech, O'Shannon spoke briefly in Irish. This was just after Arthur Griffith had been elected President of Dáil Éireann after a walkout by the anti-Treaty TDs led by Éamon de Valera
12 December 1922	Dáil (3rd) with Seanad (1st) members present	Tim Healy	Governor-General	Irish Free State	Governor-General's Address six days after the creation of the Irish Free State. Labour Party members boycotted the speech.
3 October 1923	Dáil (4th) with Seanad (1st) members present	Tim Healy	Governor-General	Irish Free State	Governor-General's Address after the 1923 general election
28 June 1963	Joint sitting of 17th Dáil and 10th Seanad	John F. Kennedy	President	United States	Kennedy presented the banner of the Irish Brigade under Thomas Francis Meagher flown at the Battle of Fredericksburg in 1862. His speech included the famous line, "George Bernard Shaw, speaking as an Irishman, summed up an approach to life: Other peoples, he said, see things and say: 'Why?' … But I dream things that never were—and I say: 'Why not?'"
21 January 1969	Simultaneous sitting of 18th Dáil and 11th Seanad	Éamon de Valera	President	Ireland	Address under Article 13.7, marking the 50th anniversary of the first meeting of the First Dáil. Rather than at the Oireachtas' modern home in Leinster House, the houses sat in the Mansion House where the 1919 meeting had been held. The speech was in Irish. Joe Clarke interrupted it to protest at the arrest of Dennis Dennehy.
4 June 1984	Joint sitting of 24th Dáil and 17th Seanad	Ronald Reagan	President	United States	Three left-wing TDs — Tony Gregory, Tomás Mac Giolla and Proinsias De Rossa — left the chamber during the proceedings.
21 October 1987	Dáil (25th)	Bob Hawke	Prime Minister	Australia	
26 February 1988	Joint sitting of 25th Dáil and 18th Seanad	François Mitterrand	President	France	The speech was in French.
2 July 1990	Dáil (26th)	Nelson Mandela	Deputy Leader of the African National Congress	South Africa	Several months after his release from prison, and early in the negotiated end to apartheid.
8 July 1992	Joint sitting of 26th Dáil and 19th Seanad	Mary Robinson	President	Ireland	Address under Article 13.7, on the topic "the Irish Identity in Europe".
20 September 1993	Dáil (27th)	Paul Keating	Prime Minister	Australia	
2 February 1995	Joint sitting of 27th Dáil and 20th Seanad	Mary Robinson	President	Ireland	Address under Article 13.7 titled "Cherishing the Irish Diaspora"
1 December 1995	Joint sitting of 27th Dáil and 20th Seanad	Bill Clinton	President	United States	Address made at an early stage in the Northern Ireland peace process
2 October 1996	Dáil (27th)	Helmut Kohl	Chancellor	Germany	The speech was in German.
26 November 1998	Joint sitting of 28th Dáil and 21st Seanad	Tony Blair	Prime Minister	United Kingdom	Address made after the Belfast Agreement.
16 December 1999	Joint sitting of 28th Dáil and 21st Seanad	Mary McAleese	President	Ireland	Address under Article 13.7 to mark the millennium.
23 May 2006	Dáil (29th)	John Howard	Prime Minister	Australia	
4 October 2012	Dáil (31st)	Martin Schulz	President	European Parliament	
11 May 2017	32nd Dáil and 25th Seanad sitting in joint committee of the whole	Michel Barnier	Chief Negotiator on Brexit	European Commission	Described as an "exchange of views" with Barnier rather than an address by him.
21 June 2018	Joint sitting of 32nd Dáil and 25th Seanad	Jean-Claude Juncker	President	European Commission	
6 April 2022	Joint sitting of 33rd Dáil and 26th Seanad	Volodymyr Zelenskyy	President	Ukraine	First address by video link. One of many addresses by Zelenskyy to legislatures seeking support after the 2022 Russian invasion of Ukraine.
1 December 2022	Joint sitting of 33rd Dáil and 26th Seanad	Ursula von der Leyen	President	European Commission	Marking the 50th anniversary of Ireland's EU accession.
2 February 2023	Joint sitting of 33rd Dáil and 26th Seanad	Roberta Metsola	President	European Parliament	Marking the 50th anniversary of Ireland's EU accession.
13 April 2023	Joint sitting of 33rd Dáil and 26th Seanad	Joe Biden	President	United States	25th anniversary of the Good Friday Agreement. People Before Profit members boycotted the speech.
2 December 2025	Joint sitting of 34th Dáil and 27th Seanad	Volodymyr Zelenskyy	President	Ukraine	Address in person during a state visit by Zelenskyy and his wife, Olena Zelenska.

On 28 April 1949, Jawaharlal Nehru, the Prime Minister of India, was received on the floor of the Dáil; he did not make a speech.

On 21 January 2019, a programme of events in the Mansion House, to mark the centenary of the First Dáil, included an address by President Michael D. Higgins and a joint sitting of the 32nd Dáil and 25th Seanad; however, the address was not formally part of the joint sitting.

On 18 April 2019, Nancy Pelosi, the Speaker of the United States House of Representatives, addressed current and former members of the Oireachtas, but not at a formal sitting of the Dáil or Seanad.

== See also ==
- List of addresses to Seanad Éireann; such addresses are a more regular part of the Seanad's ordinary business.
