= John Hughes (sculptor) =

- Born: 27 January 1865; Dublin, Ireland
- Died: 1941 (aged 75–76); Nice, France
- Occupation: sculptor

John Hughes (27 January 1865 – 6 June 1941) was an Irish sculptor.

== Life ==
Hughes was born in Dublin and educated by the Christian Brothers at O'Connell School in North Richmond Street, Dublin. He entered the Metropolitan School of Art in Dublin in 1878 and trained as a part-time student for ten years. In 1890 he won a scholarship to the South Kensington School of Art, London, after which another scholarship took him to Paris. He then studied further in Italy where he became deeply influenced by Renaissance sculpture. He was appointed as teacher to the Metropolitan School of Art in Dublin in 1894 and in 1902 became Professor of Sculpture in the Royal Hibernian Academy School. His last residence in Dublin was at 28 Lennox Street, Portobello. From 1903 he moved to Paris, where he worked on Ireland's monument to Queen Victoria. In 1905, Hughes became a founding member of the Royal Society of Sculptors. In 1920 he relocated to Florence, where he lived with one of his sisters until 1926, after which he spent most of his time traveling through France and Italy. He died at Nice on 6 June 1941.

== Works ==
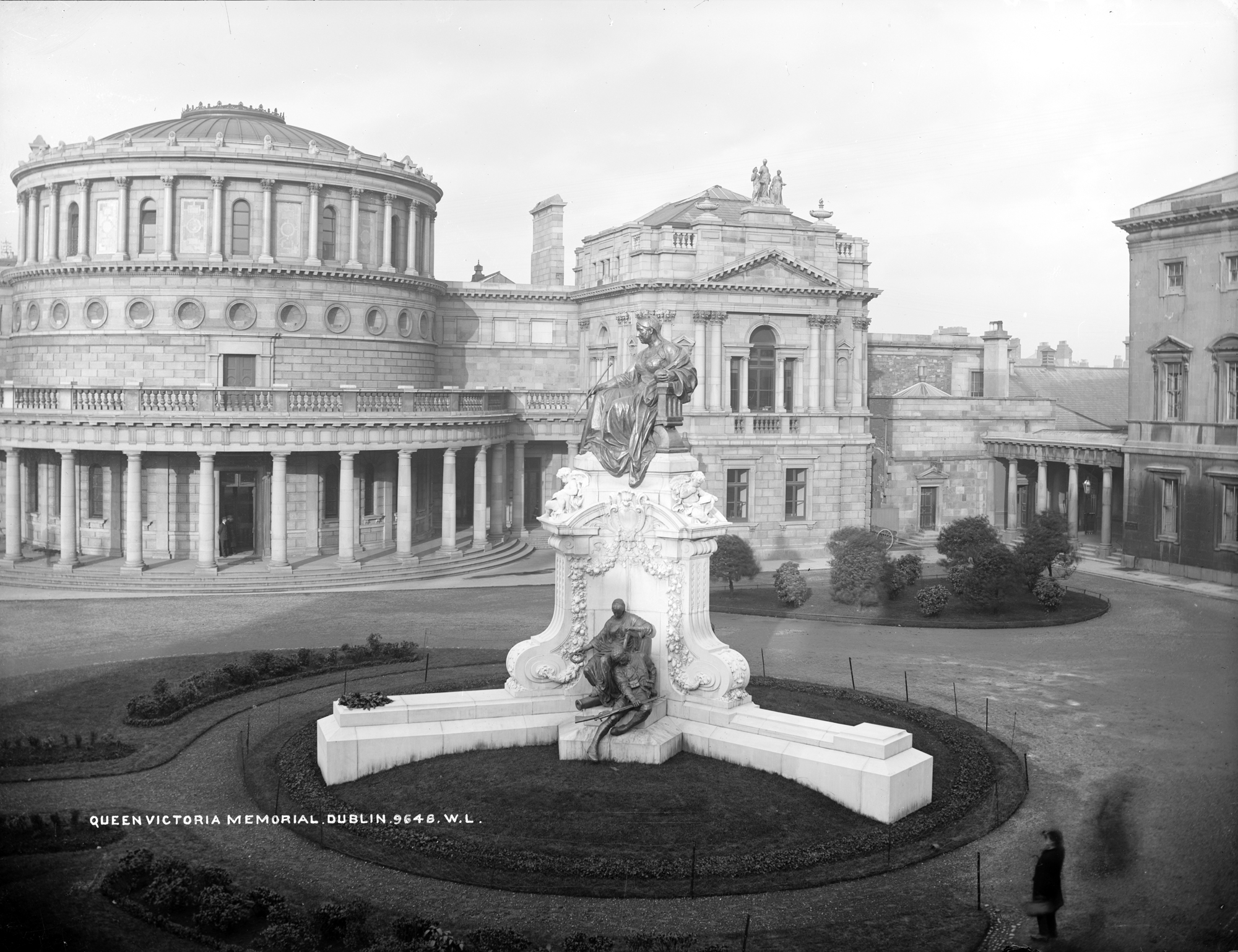
Statue of Queen Victoria in front of the National Library of Ireland (circa 1908)

In Ireland:

- Man of Sorrow; Madonna and Child, both 1901, for Loughrea Cathedral
- A dying Irish soldier overlooked by Erin, now in the garden of Dublin Castle Conference Centre
- Monument to Charles Kickham, in Tipperary.
- Monument to George Salmon, at Trinity College Dublin

Others:

- W. E. Gladstone Memorial, intended for the Phoenix Park, but installed instead at Hawarden in 1925.
- Queen Victoria, unveiled by the Lord Lieutenant of Ireland in 1907 outside Leinster House in Dublin, re-erected in Sydney, Australia in 1987.
- Bronze altar reliefs at Loughrea cathedral.
