= Alyona Shkrum =

Ukrainian politician

- Альона Шкрум
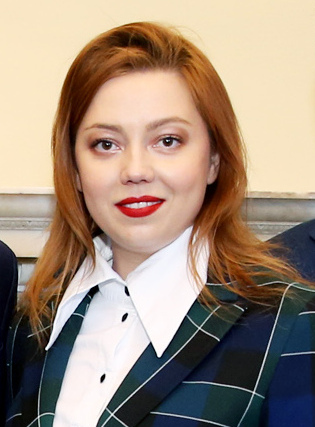

Deputy-Minister of Communities and Territories Development
- Incumbent
- Assumed office 3 December 2024

People's Deputy of Ukraine
- In office 27 November 2014 – 3 December 2024

Personal details
- Born: 2 January 1988 (age 38) Kyiv, Ukrainian SSR, Soviet Union
- Party: All-Ukrainian Union "Fatherland"
- Spouse: Dmytro Natalukha
- Education: Taras Shevchenko National University of Kyiv, Paris 1 University, Trinity Hall at University of Cambridge

Alyona Ivanivna Shkrum (Ukrainian: Альона Іванівна Шкрум, born 2 January 1988) is a Ukrainian politician, lawyer, human rights activist, public figure. She was from 2014 to December 2024 a member of the Verkhovna Rada (Ukraine's national parliament) for the All-Ukrainian Union "Fatherland". On 3 December 2024 she was appointed Deputy-Minister of Communities and Territories Development.

== Early life and education ==
Shkrum studied law at Taras Shevchenko National University of Kyiv, has an MA degree in law from the Paris 1 Panthéon-Sorbonne University and from Trinity Hall at University of Cambridge.

In 2008-2009 served as a Junior Associate at Volkov Koziakov and Partners Law Firm (Kyiv), in 2010-2011 was an associate at the Chevalier Pericard Connesson Bar Association (Paris).

In 2012 worked as an assistant to the attorneys of the law firms belonging to the Inner Temple Association (London).

In 2013 completed internship in the office of Peter Julian, Member of the House of Commons of the Canadian Parliament.

Before entering the parliament, served as an advocacy expert at the Right to Protection (Kyiv). This organisation is an implementing partner of the UNCHR.

== Political career ==
Before being elected People's Deputy of Ukraine Shkrum worked as a parliamentary assistant for of (fellow) politician Iryna Herashchenko and Igor Alekseyev in the 7th Ukrainian Verkhovna Rada (2012 – 2014).

In 2014, Shkrum was elected to the Verkhovna Rada (Ukraine's national parliament) on the party list (placed 5th) of Batkivshchyna. She was included in the party's electoral list in an open competition as a member of the Professional Government initiative.

Shkrum was re-elected for the same party (placed 22nd this time) in the 2019 Ukrainian parliamentary election.

=== The 8th Ukrainian Verkhovna Rada ===
Shkrum served as:

- Deputy member of the Ukrainian part of the EU-Ukraine Parliamentary Association Committee
- Member of the Inter-Parliamentary Union Standing Committee on Peace and International Security. The main achievement of the work in the IPU Committee was the development of the text, amendments and presentation of the Resolution from Ukraine at the 140th IPU Assembly in Doha. It was the first Ukrainian resolution in the 130 years of the organization's existence: "On non-admissibility of using mercenaries and foreign fighters as a means of undermining peace, international security and the territorial integrity of States, and violating human rights".
- Co-chair of the group on inter-parliamentary relations with France
- Member of the groups on inter-parliamentary relations with the United States, Sweden, United Kingdom, Turkey, Germany and Malta

=== The 9th Ukrainian Verkhovna Rada ===
In 2019 Shkrum was reelected, she served as:

- Member of the governing body (Bureau) of the Committee on Peace and International Security of the Inter-Parliamentary Union
- Co-chair of the group on inter-parliamentary relations with France
- Secretary of the groups on inter-parliamentary relations with Japan and the United Kingdom
- Member of the groups on inter-parliamentary relations with Canada, Australia, Singapore and Lithuania

On 2 December 2024 Shkrum officially requested the deprivation of her parliamentary mandate. The following day parliament withdrew her mandate. Later that day she was appointed Deputy-Minister of Communities and Territories Development.

=== Since the beginning of the Russian invasion of Ukraine ===
Shkrum has been a member to a number of parliamentary delegations:

- United Kingdom: had meetings with the Prime Minister Boris Johnson, British politicians, Secretary of State for Defense Ben Wallace, Home Secretary Priti Patel; discussions on arms supplies and closure of Ukrainian airspace, coordination of the UK program Homes for Ukraine.
- France: had meetings with President of France Emmanuel Macron, President of the French Senate Gerard Larcher, Mayor of Paris Anne Hidalgo; participation in the meeting of the Assembly of the Francophonie.
- European Parliament: had meetings with President of the European Parliament Roberta Metsola, Chairman of the European Parliament Committee on Women's Rights and Gender Equality Robert Biedroń, NATO Secretary General's Special Representative for Women, Peace and Security Irene Fellin and others.
- World Economic Forum in Davos: gave speeches at 3 panels, 1 roundtable, 2 closed events, 1 special discussion at Ukraine House, had meetings with President of Latvia Egils Levits, Prime Minister of Croatia Andrej Plenković and others.
- Inter-parliamentary Union: during the 145th Assembly of the organization in Rwanda in October 2022, participated in the preparation of the final resolution condemning Russian aggression against Ukraine; accepted the Inter-Parliamentary Union Award for MPs and the Presidium of the Verkhovna Rada; during the 146th Assembly in Bahrain in March 2023, she took part in a series of meetings with the states of the Global South and was one of the organizers of an event on demining the territories of Ukraine, which was attended by 25 countries; at the same time, a resolution was adopted on the protection of civilians in the context of a humanitarian catastrophe in Ukraine.

=== Political stance during the war ===
- Shkrum is one of the activists of the #UnrussiaUN movement and the petition "Kick Russia out of the UN" aimed at depriving the Russian Federation of its membership in the UN, which is illegitimate in view of Russia's war against Ukraine (according to Article 4 of the UN Charter) and the absence of a procedure for the country's accession to the organization after the collapse of the USSR. She expressed her position in an article in TIME, noting, in particular, that "without restoring the rule of law within its own organization, the UN will become more and more irrelevant, just as the League of Nations did when it failed to react to the Third Reich's invasion of Poland in 1939." She also called for Russia's expulsion from the UN in an article published in The Scotsman.
- She took an active part in the #bloodytrade campaign, addressed to Western companies that did not leave the Russian market after the start of a full-scale war against Ukraine. One of the achievements was the closure of Decathlon stores in Russia, while Auchan and Leroy Merlin refused to leave Russia. In addition, considerable attention was paid to the issue of not including the Russian state-owned diamond producer ALROSA in the EU sanctions packages against Russia 8 times in a row.
- She was one of the initiators of the global LightUpUkraine campaign, which was held on December 21, 2022, in a number of countries, during which the lights were turned off for one hour in festive locations, government agencies, shops and homes of ordinary citizens in solidarity with Ukrainians suffering from Russian strikes on critical infrastructure. The campaign was aimed at raising $10 million for power generators for Ukrainian hospitals.

== Family ==
Shkrum is married to Dmytro Natalukha. In the 2019 Ukrainian parliamentary election Natalukha was a candidate for the party Servant of the People. Natalukha and Shkrum were both elected into parliament.

== Awards and honors ==
Shkrum has been awarded multiple times. According to Kyiv Post, in 2016 she became one of the ‘Top 30 under 30’, the most successful Ukrainian people under the age of 30. The MP also holds the 2016 Diploma of the Verkhovna Rada of Ukraine for her significant personal contribution to the reform of local self-government. Shkrum was honored by NV magazine as she was included in the Top 100 Successful Women of Ukraine in 2018. In 2019 the Ukrainian public campaign Chesno named Shkrum one of the top 25 most honest MPs of the 8th Ukrainian Verkhovna Rada.
