= Leinster House =

Seat of the parliament of Ireland, Dublin

- Teach Laighean
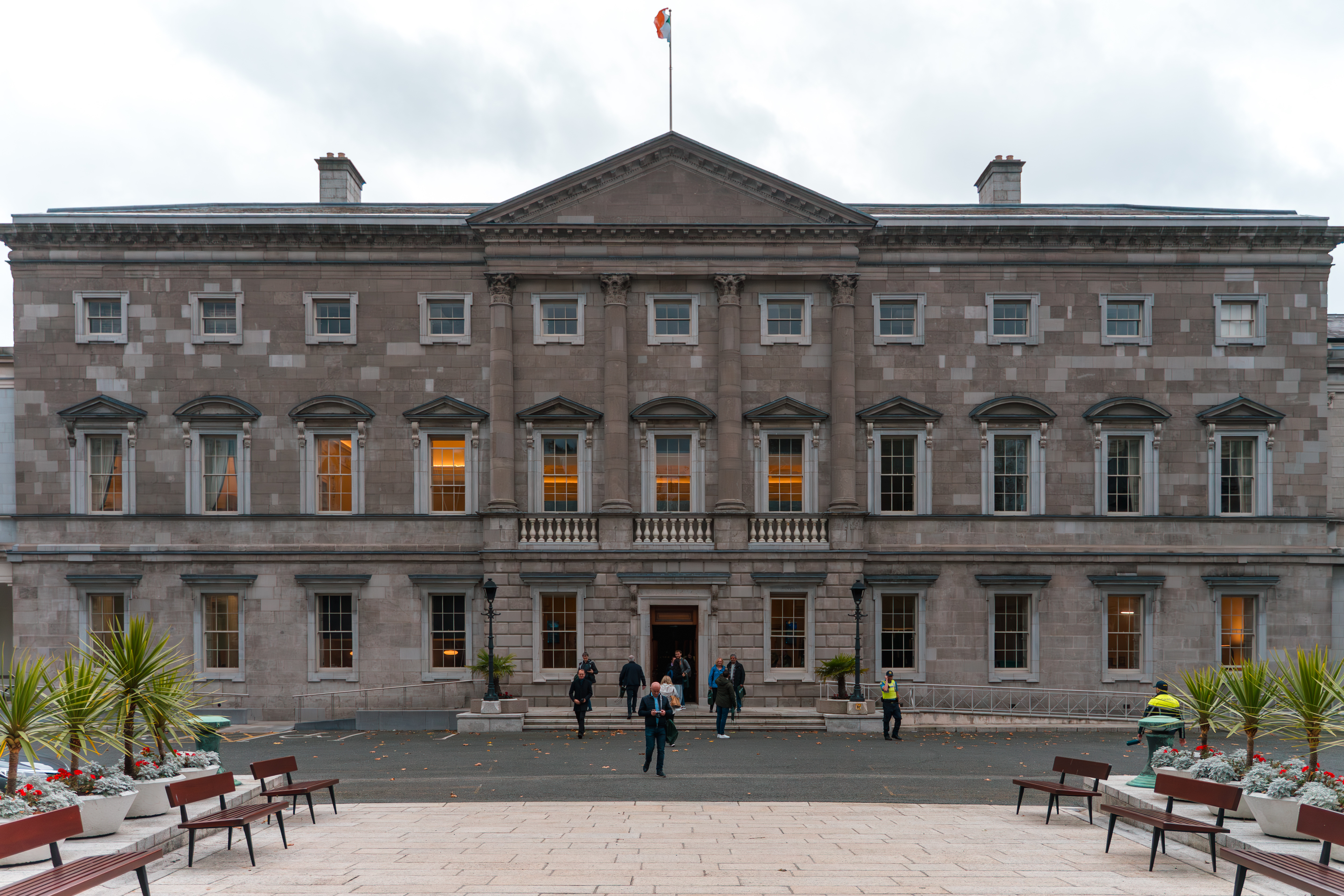
- Main façade of Leinster House.

- Location within Central Dublin

General information
- Architectural style: Georgian, Palladian
- Location: Kildare Street, Dublin, Ireland
- Coordinates: 53.34055°N 6.254021°W
- Current tenants: Oireachtas
- Construction started: 1745
- Completed: 1748; 278 years ago

Technical details
- Material: Ardbraccan limestone

Design and construction
- Architect: Richard Cassels
- Developer: James FitzGerald, 1st Duke of Leinster

Leinster House (Irish: Teach Laighean) is the seat of the Oireachtas, the parliament of Ireland. Originally, it was the ducal palace of the Dukes of Leinster.

Since 1922, it has been a complex of buildings which houses Oireachtas Éireann, its members and staff. The most recognisable part of the complex and the "public face" of Leinster House continues to be the former ducal palace at the core of the complex.

== History ==
=== Ducal palace ===
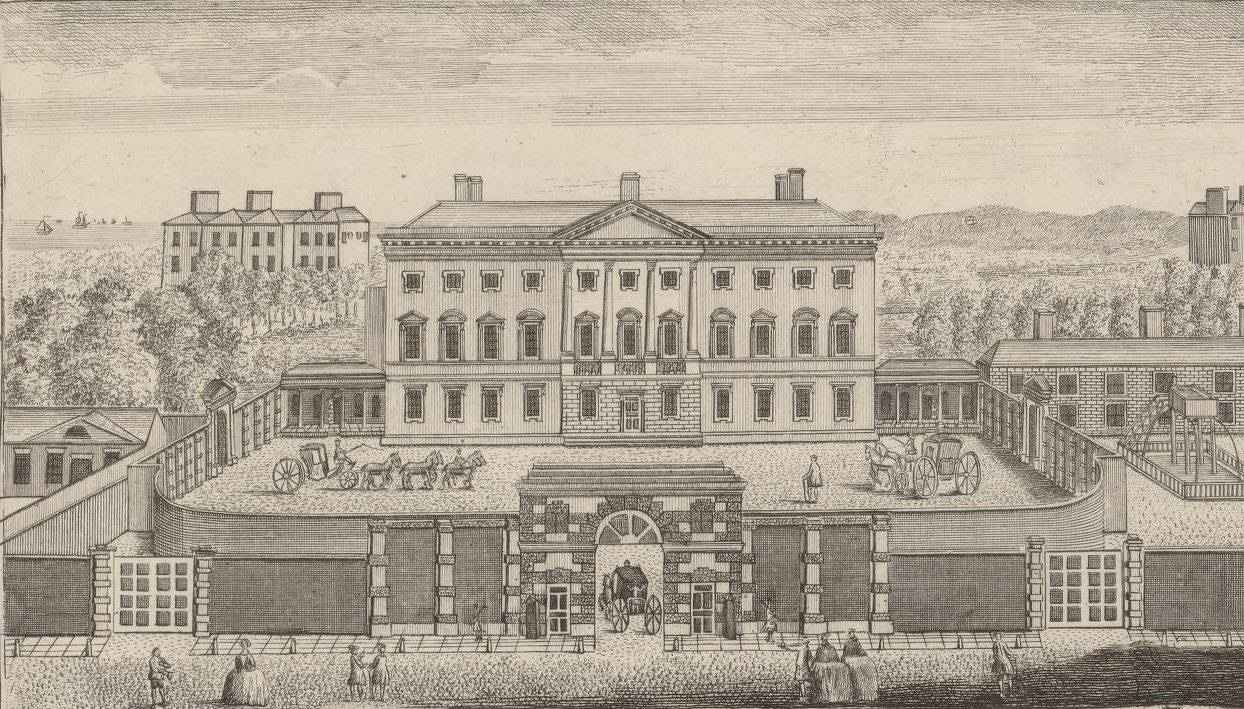
Leinster House from an illustration of 1757 by John Rocque

Leinster House was the former ducal residence in Dublin of the Duke of Leinster, and since 1922 has served as the parliament building of the Irish Free State, the predecessor of the modern Irish state, before which it functioned as the headquarters of the Royal Dublin Society. The society's famous Dublin Spring Show and Dublin Horse Show were held on its Leinster Lawn, facing Merrion Square. The building is the meeting place of Dáil Éireann and Seanad Éireann, the two houses of the Oireachtas, and as such the term 'Leinster House' has become a metonym for Irish political activities.

=== Irish Parliament ===
Ireland's parliament over the centuries had met in a number of locations, most notably in the Irish Houses of Parliament at College Green, next to Trinity College Dublin. Its medieval parliament consisted of two Houses, a House of Commons and a House of Lords. Ireland's senior peer, the Earl of Kildare, had a seat in the Lords. Like all the aristocrats of the period, for the duration of the Social Season and parliamentary sessions, he and his family resided in state in a Dublin residence.

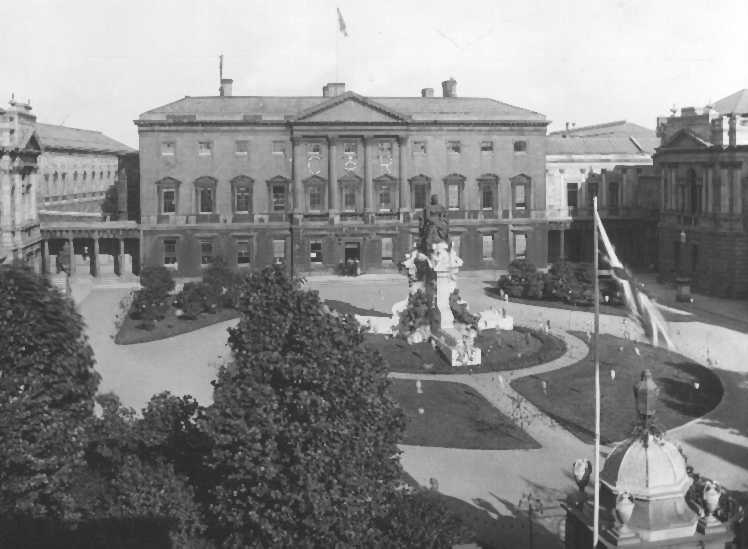
Leinster House in 1911

From the late eighteenth century, Leinster House (then called Kildare House) was the Earl's official Dublin residence. When it was first built in 1745–48 by James FitzGerald, Earl of Kildare, it was located on the unfashionable and isolated south side of the city, far from the main locations of aristocratic residences, namely Rutland Square (now Parnell Square) and Mountjoy Square. The Earl predicted that others would follow; in succeeding decades Merrion Square and Fitzwilliam Square became the primary location of residences of the aristocracy, with many of their northside residences being sold (many subsequently deteriorating and ending up as slums). The building itself was designed by architect Richard Cassels while some of the later elements and interior were designed by Isaac Ware.

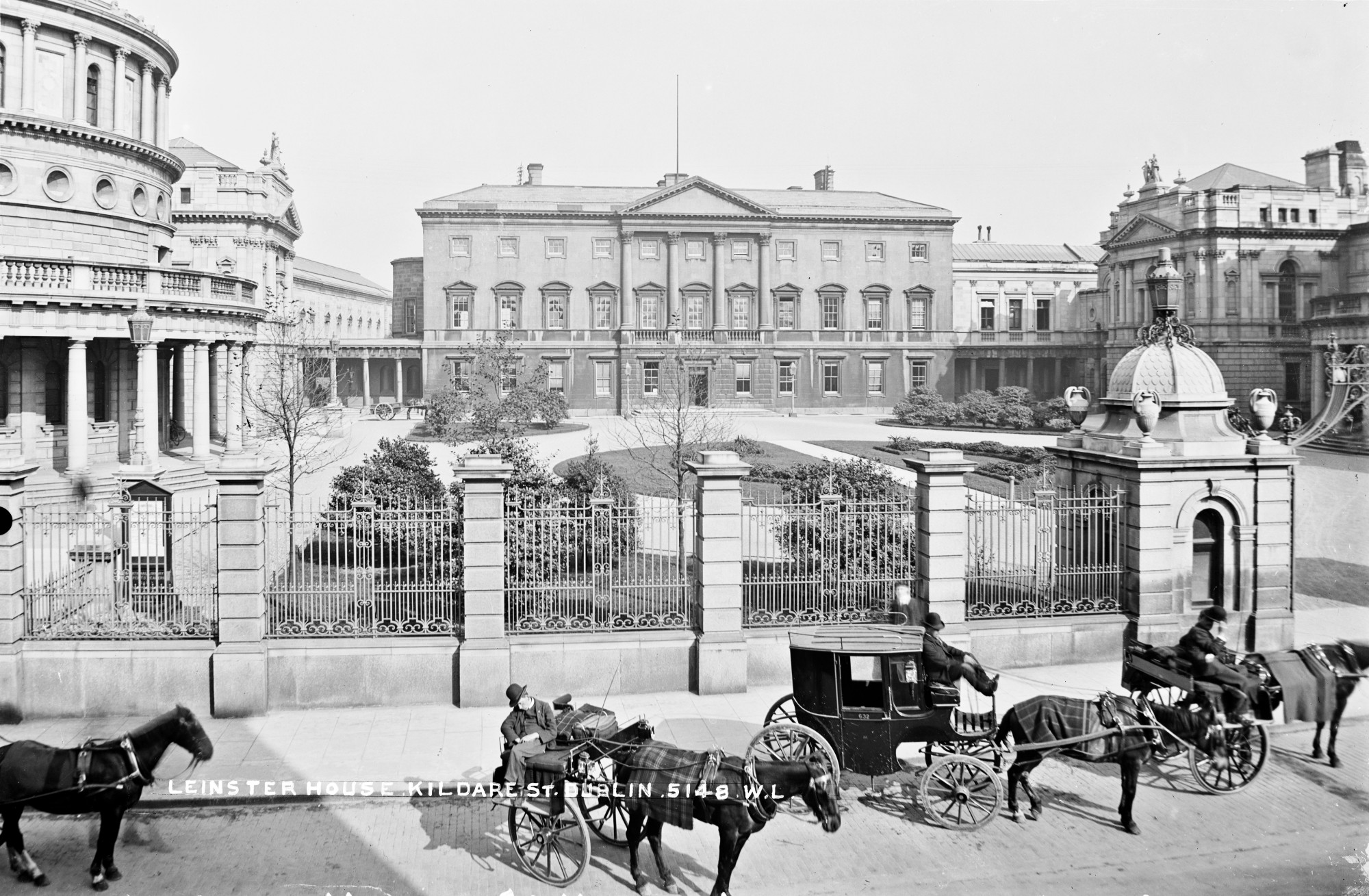
Leinster House, view from Kildare Street, Dublin

In the history of aristocratic residences in Dublin, no other mansion matched Kildare House for its sheer size or status. When the Earl was made the first Duke of Leinster in 1766, the family's Dublin residence was renamed Leinster House. Its first and second floors were used as the floor model for the White House by Irish architect James Hoban, while the house itself was used as a model for the original stone-cut White House exterior.

One famous member of the family who occasionally resided in Leinster House was Lord Edward FitzGerald, who became involved with Irish nationalism during the 1798 Rebellion, which cost him his life. With the passage of the Act of Union in 1800, Ireland ceased to have its own parliament. Without a House of Lords to attend, increasing numbers of aristocrats stopped coming to Dublin, selling off their Dublin residences, in many cases to buy residences in London, where the new united parliament met.

=== RDS headquarters 1815–1922 ===
The 3rd Duke of Leinster sold Leinster House in 1815 to the Royal Dublin Society. In 1853 the Great Industrial Exhibition was hosted in its grounds. The Natural History Museum was built on the site in 1857. Around the same time, two new wings were added, to house the National Library of Ireland and the National Museum of Ireland.

=== Oireachtas from 1922 ===
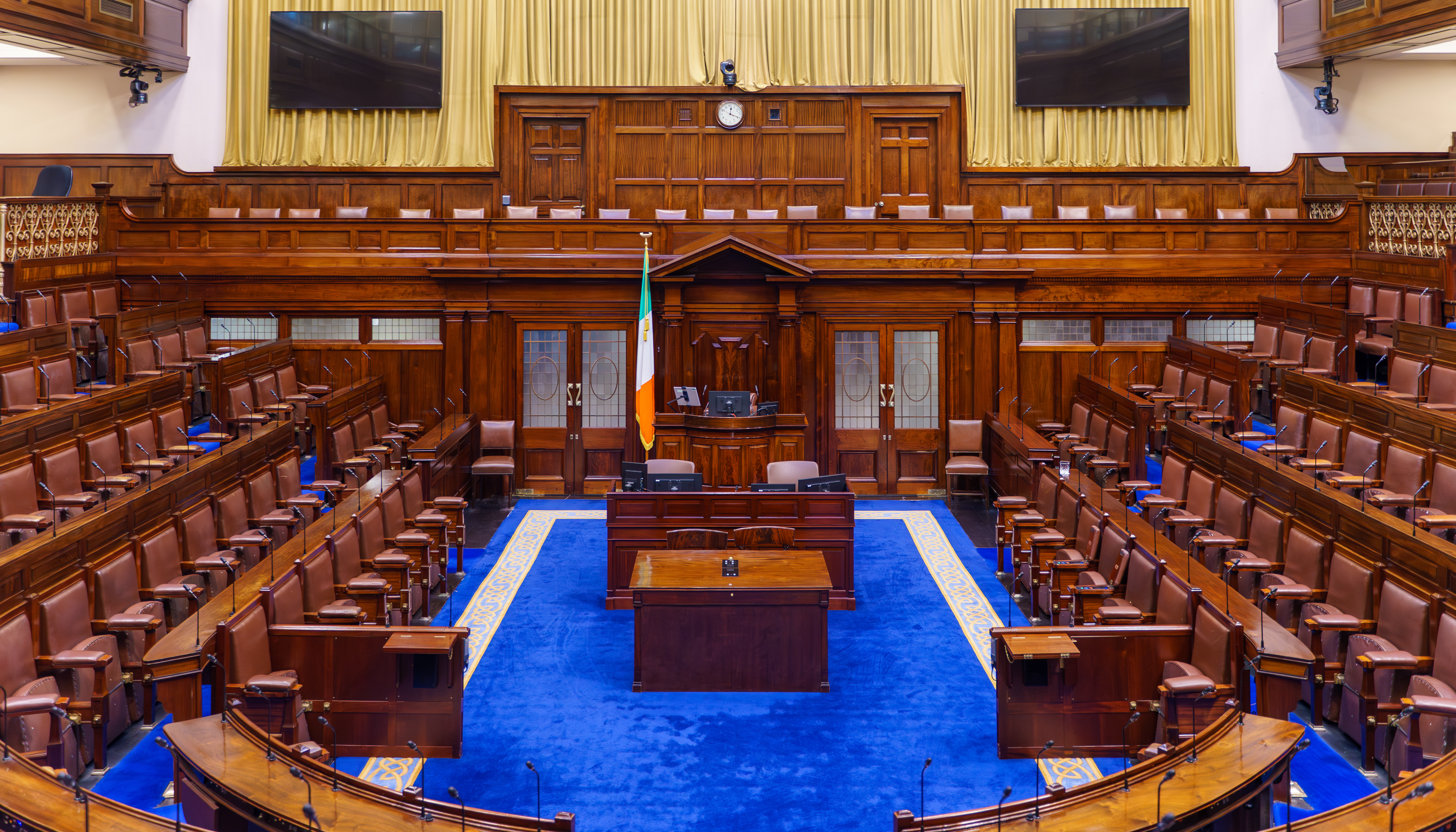
Dáil Chamber

The Anglo-Irish Treaty of 1921 provided for the creation of a self-governing Irish dominion, to be called the Irish Free State. As plans were made to bring the new state into being, the Provisional Government under W. T. Cosgrave sought a temporary venue for the meetings of the new Chamber of Deputies Dáil Éireann and Senate Seanad Éireann. Plans were made to turn Royal Hospital Kilmainham, an eighteenth-century former soldiers' home in extensive parklands, into a full-time Parliament House. However, as it was still under the control of the British Army, who had yet to withdraw from it, and the new Governor-General of the Irish Free State was due to deliver the Speech from the Throne opening parliament within weeks, Michael Collins decided to hire the Leinster House complex for use from September 1922 as a temporary Dáil chamber as it housed a large lecture theatre that could easily be adapted to the needs of the Oireachtas.

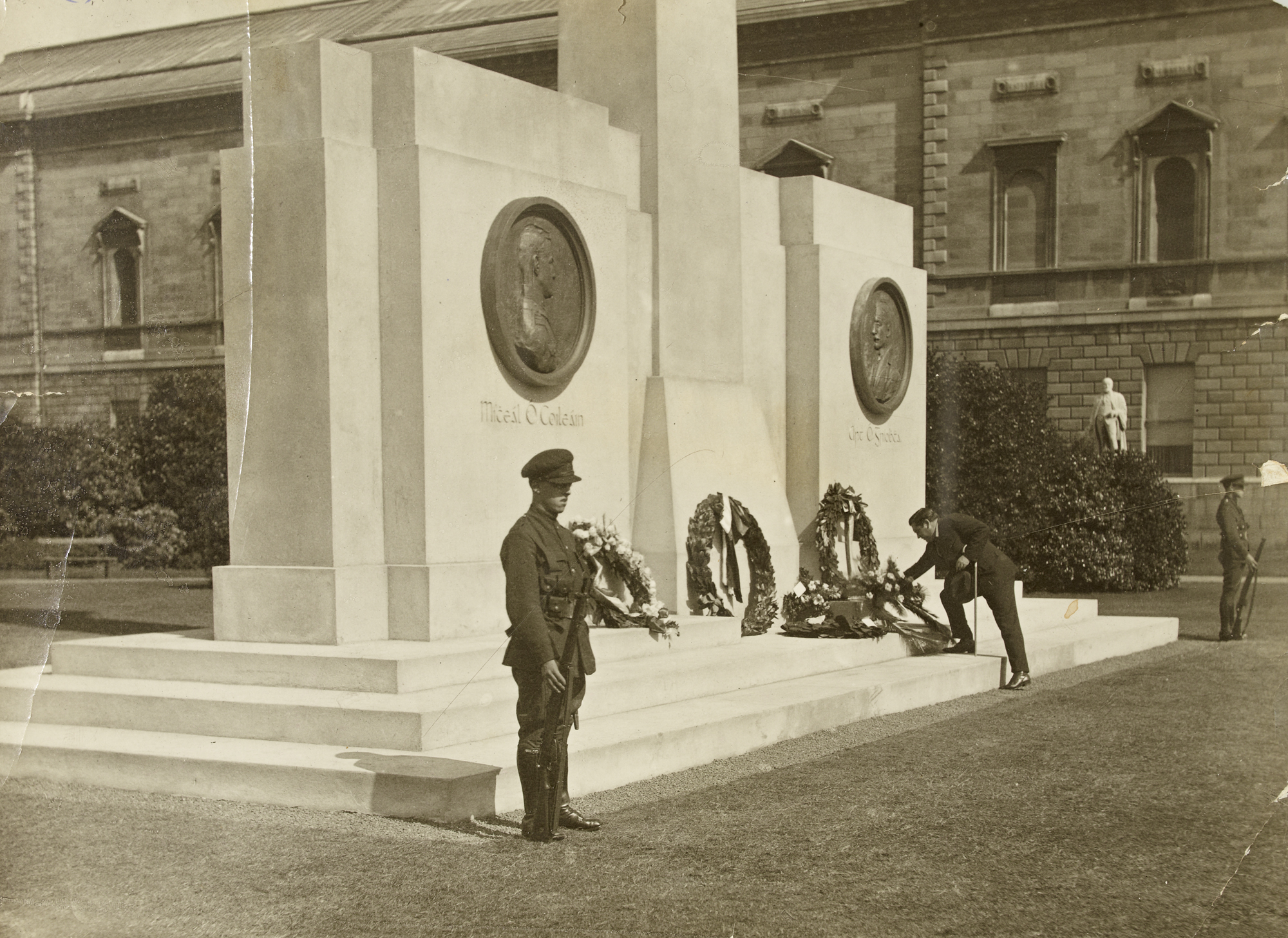
Former monument to Michael Collins and Arthur Griffith on Leinster Lawn, shown here in 1923 and removed in 1939

In 1924, due to financial constraints, plans to turn the Royal Hospital into a parliament house were abandoned; Leinster House, instead becoming the chapel of democracy, was bought, pending the provision of a proper parliament house at some stage in the future. A new Senate or Seanad chamber was created in the Duke's old ballroom, while wings from the neighbouring Royal College of Science were taken over and used as Government Buildings. The entire Royal College of Science, which by then had been merged with University College Dublin, was subsequently taken over in 1990 and turned into state-of-the-art Government Buildings.

Since then, a number of extensions have been added, most recently in 2000, to provide adequate office space for 174 TDs, 60 senators, members of the press and other staff. Among the world leaders who have visited Leinster House to address joint sessions of the Oireachtas are U.S. presidents John F. Kennedy, Ronald Reagan and Bill Clinton; British Prime Minister Tony Blair; Australian prime ministers Bob Hawke, Paul Keating, and John Howard; and French President François Mitterrand.

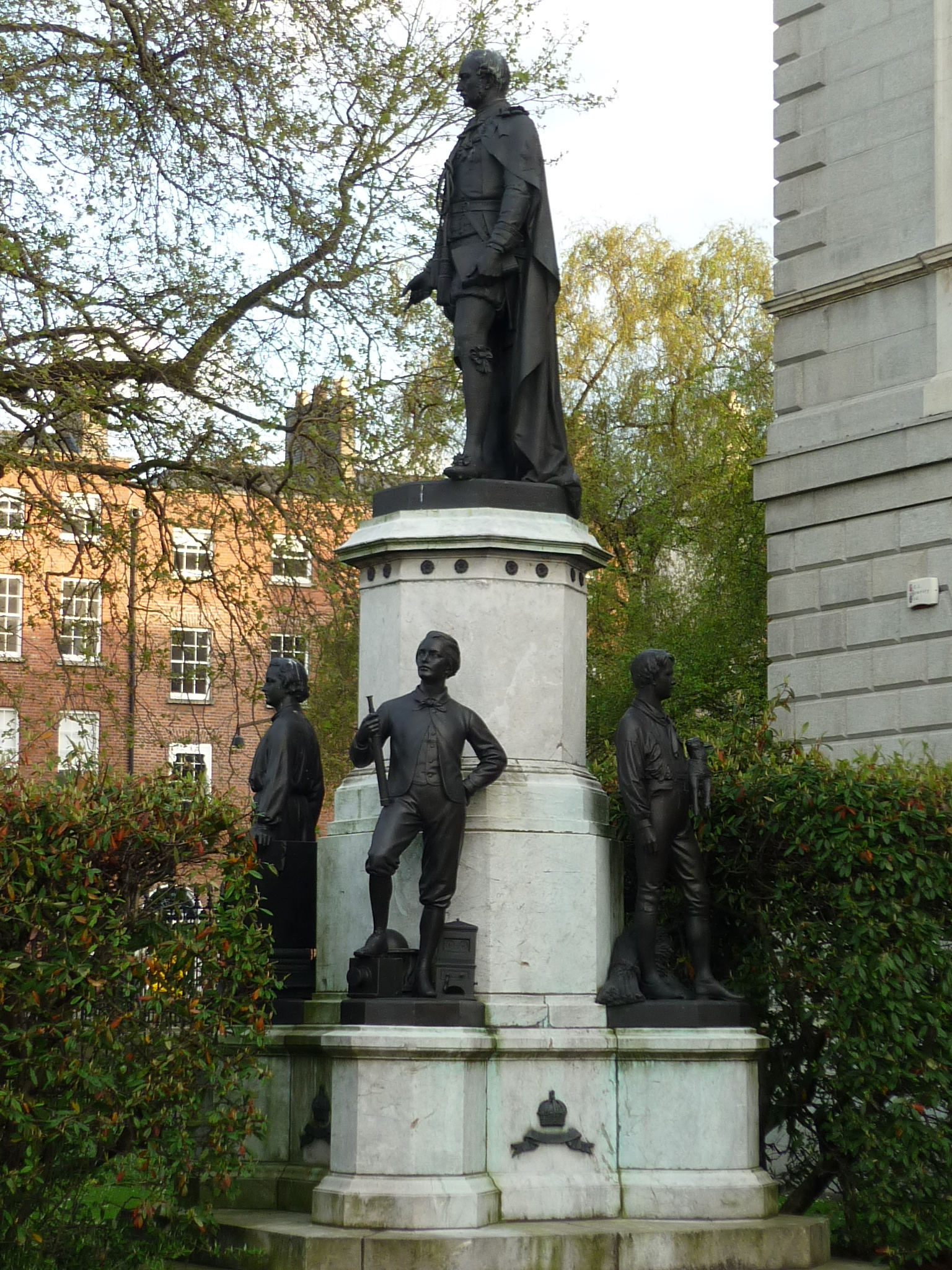
The statue of Prince Albert

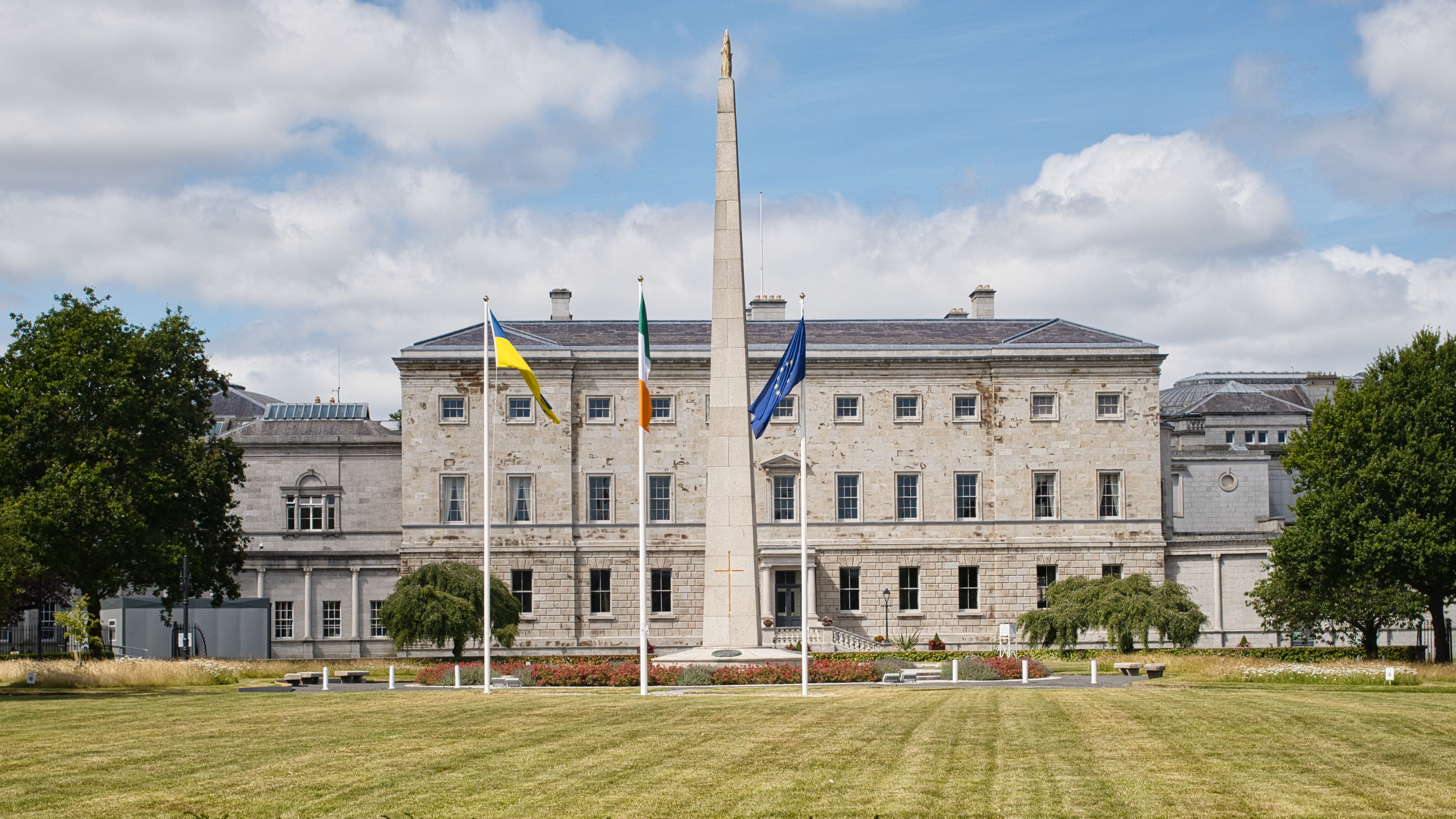
Cenotaph dedicated to the leaders of Irish independence

A number of monuments stand or have stood, around Leinster House. Its Kildare Street frontage used to be dominated by Queen Victoria, a large seated bronze statue by John Hughes, first unveiled by King Edward VII in 1908. Considering it inappropriate to have the British Queen overlooking the Irish parliament it was relocated to the Royal Hospital Kilmainham in 1948, as part of moves by the Irish state towards declaring a Republic. It was re-erected in 1987 in front of the Queen Victoria Building in Sydney, Australia. Facing the garden front on its Merrion Square side, stands a large triangular monument commemorating three founding figures of Irish independence, President of Dáil Éireann Arthur Griffith, who died in 1922, Michael Collins, who was shot and killed in an ambush by anti-treaty forces in 1922, and Kevin O'Higgins, the Chairman of the Provisional Government and the Vice-President of the Executive Council (deputy prime minister), who was assassinated in 1927. Another statue commemorates the Prince Consort, Prince Albert, husband of Queen Victoria, who held his major Irish Exhibition on Leinster Lawn in the 1850s.

=== Modern history ===
In September 2024, the perceived over-expenditure by the Office of Public Works on a bike shed for the use of Dáil members at Leinster House caused a controversy in Irish politics and media.

== Extensions ==
The main building has undergone regular extensions from Victorian times, through to a major extension to create offices for TDs in the 1960s, to most recently the building of Leinster House 2000, a new block of offices built to the north of the original ducal palace. The main extensions are:

- the Victorian additions to the complex which contain the Dáil Chamber
- a 1930s addition which houses Labour Party TDs and Senators
- the so-called Block 66 a five-storey office block which was built circa 1966 and which houses Fine Gael TDs and senators, with two restaurants and two bars at ground-floor level and which houses the office suite of the leader of the largest party in the Oireachtas (currently Fianna Fáil) and the party's meeting rooms. One of the bars is for visitors while the other is reserved for parliamentarians, the teachtaí dála and senators.
- Leinster House 2000, a new wing erected in 2000, which houses members of all parties, committee rooms and contains the office suites of the leaders of Labour and Fianna Fáil
- some modern offices across Kildare Street in Kildare House
- the top floors of Agriculture House, the Department of Agriculture building which on those floors house offices for independent TDs and independent senators
- offices on Molesworth Street which are used also by some members of the Oireachtas, most notably the office provided for former taoisigh.

== Structural concerns and restoration ==
A commissioned report delivered to the Ceann Comhairle's office in 2008 cast serious doubts on the safety of Leinster House without major remedial work. Warning that the building presented a risk to the safety and health of occupants and the public, the report outlined nine serious risks to the building, due to a combination of factors, including:

- the age of the building
- renovations over the centuries to the ducal palace made by its various owners which were substandard
- significant overloading of floors on upper levels
- inadequate and outdated wiring

If repairs were not carried out it outlined as a worst-case scenario "The facility is damaged/contaminated beyond habitable use. Most items/assets are lost, destroyed or damaged beyond repair/restoration."

The building underwent massive restoration and conservation work from December 2017 until August 2019, during which time the entire original Kildare House section was shielded from the elements under a temporary scaffold and plastic roof. Granite from Golden Hill quarry in County Wicklow was originally used in the construction of the Merrion Street side of the building in the 1740s, but was exhausted as a quarry by 1850. To ensure consistency in the type of granite used in the repairs, the Office of Public Works opted for stone from Ballyknockan quarry, being the nearest geographical substitute.

== Legacy and inspirations ==
- Charleston County Courthouse, Charleston, South Carolina
- White House, Washington, D.C.

== See also ==
- Parliament Buildings (Northern Ireland)
