= Rostyslav Tistyk =

Ukrainian politician (born 1993)

- Ростислав Тістик
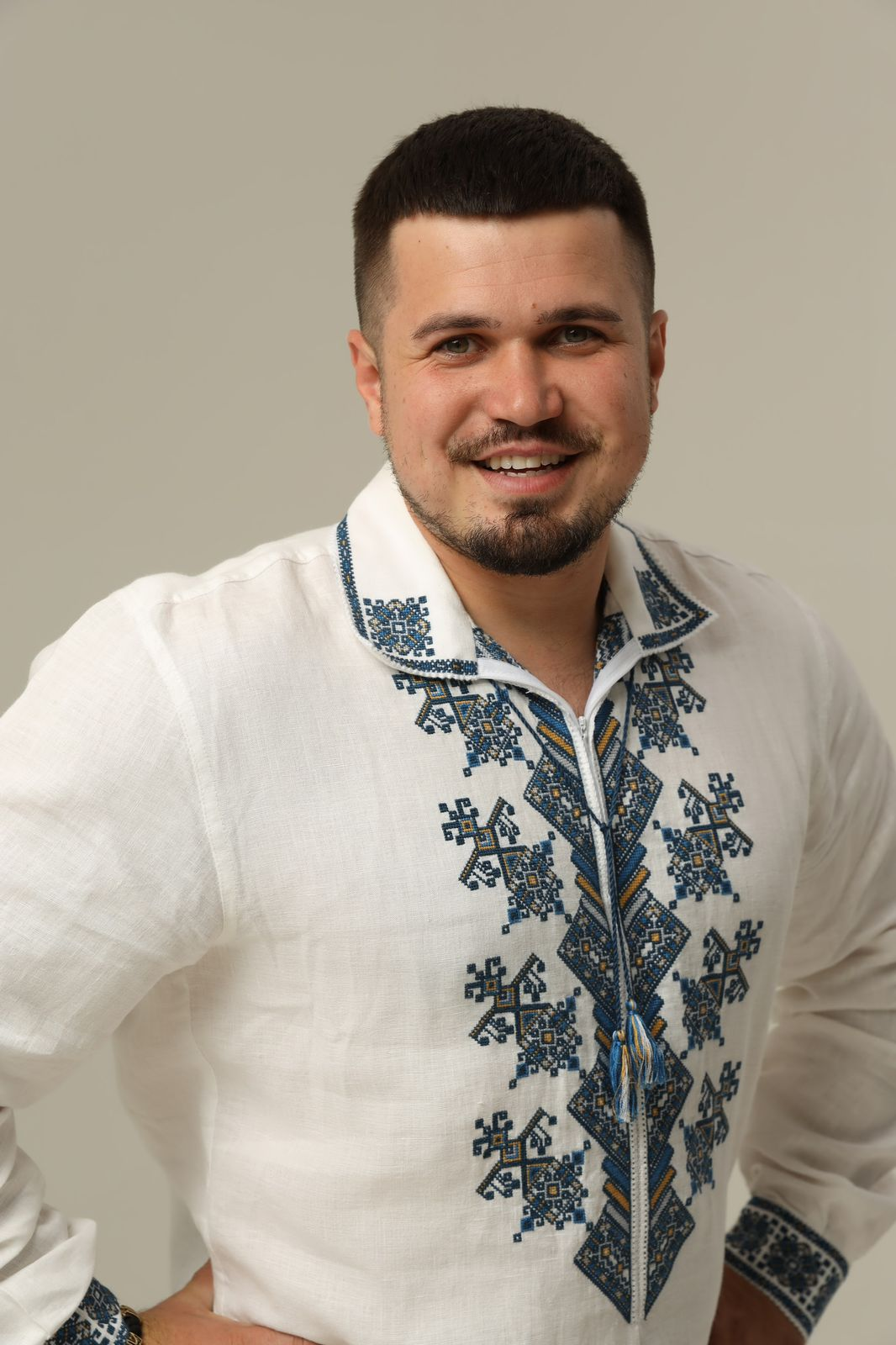
- Tistyk in 2022

People's Deputy of Ukraine
- Incumbent
- Assumed office 29 August 2019
- Constituency: Nationwide party list, no. 111

Personal details
- Born: Rostyslav Yaroslavovych Tistyk; 9 October 1993 (age 32) Lviv, Ukraine
- Party: Servant of the People
- Education: Ivan Franko National University of Lviv

Rostyslav Yaroslavovych Tistyk (Ukrainian: Ростислав Ярославович Тістик; born 9 October 1993) is a Ukrainian politician who has served as a People's Deputy of Ukraine since 2019. He was elected to the ninth convocation of the Verkhovna Rada on the nationwide party list of Servant of the People. He chairs the Subcommittee on European Integration of the Verkhovna Rada Budget Committee and is a substitute member of Ukraine's delegation to the Parliamentary Assembly of the Council of Europe (PACE).

== Early life and education ==
Tistyk was born in Lviv on 9 October 1993. He studied international economic relations at Ivan Franko National University of Lviv, attended the military department of the Hetman Petro Sahaidachnyi National Ground Forces Academy, and later completed a law programme at Ivan Franko National University of Lviv's Institute of Postgraduate Education and Pre-University Training.

On 21 August 2026, he defended a Doctor of Philosophy dissertation in political science at Ivan Franko National University of Lviv. The dissertation was titled Transformation of diplomacy in the context of Russian aggression against Ukraine.

== Career ==
Before entering politics, Tistyk worked as a legal adviser at Ukrsibbank in Lviv from 2014 to 2015 and as a chief legal adviser at Raiffeisen Bank Aval from 2015 to 2018. He subsequently worked as an entrepreneur and commercial director.

In February 2019, Tistyk became a regional representative of Volodymyr Zelenskyy's presidential campaign in Lviv Oblast. He also served as an official election observer for Zelenskyy in Lviv.

Tistyk was elected to the Verkhovna Rada in the 2019 Ukrainian parliamentary election from position 111 on the Servant of the People party list. He was an independent at the time of the election and joined the party's parliamentary faction. He served as a member of the Budget Committee from August 2019 and became chair of its Subcommittee on European Integration on 18 May 2023.

In December 2020, the Russian government added Tistyk to its list of Ukrainian individuals subject to economic sanctions. He appeared as entry 717 in the amended list.

In 2021, Tistyk was one of the parliamentary sponsors of Bill No. 4626 on the Military Chaplaincy Service, which was enacted as Law No. 1915-IX on 30 November 2021.

Tistyk chairs the Verkhovna Rada's interparliamentary relations group with the Holy See and co-chairs its group with the Czech Republic. In February 2023, he took part in the Holy See group's first working visit to the Vatican, during which Ukrainian parliamentarians met Pope Francis and officials of the Roman Curia.

He became a substitute member of Ukraine's delegation to PACE in January 2024. Within the Assembly, he has served as a member of the Sub-Committee on the European Social Charter.

On 22 July 2025, Tistyk voted for amended Bill No. 12414, which placed the National Anti-Corruption Bureau of Ukraine and the Specialized Anti-Corruption Prosecutor's Office under the authority of the prosecutor general. The measure prompted protests and criticism from European Union officials; on 31 July, parliament restored the agencies' independence.

== Fundraising activities ==
During the Russian invasion of Ukraine, Tistyk became involved with a support centre for the 125th Territorial Defence Brigade. In March 2024, a charity auction held for the brigade raised 12.53 million hryvnias towards the purchase of 500 FPV drones; Tistyk spoke on behalf of the support centre after the event. A further auction marking the brigade's third anniversary in March 2025 raised 40.1 million hryvnias for mortars, grenade launchers and pickup trucks.

== Awards ==
- Ministry of Defence of Ukraine Badge of Honour.
- Order of Saint Equal-to-the-Apostles Prince Volodymyr, 2nd class, awarded by Metropolitan Epiphanius of the Orthodox Church of Ukraine at a September 2021 ceremony in Sudova Vyshnia.
