= Dmytro Natalukha =

Ukrainian politician

- Дмитро Наталуха
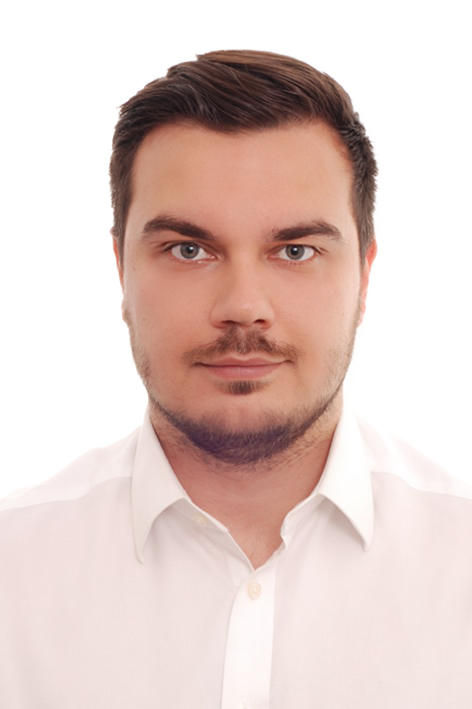
- Natalukha in 2019

People's Deputy of Ukraine
- Incumbent
- Assumed office 29 August 2019
- Constituency: Servant of the People, No. 14

Personal details
- Born: 15 September 1987 (age 39) Moscow, Russian SFSR, Soviet Union (now Russia)
- Party: Servant of the People
- Spouse: Alyona Shkrum
- Education: University of Cambridge, Taras Shevchenko National University of Kyiv

Dmytro Andriyovych Natalukha (Ukrainian: Дмитро Андрійович Наталуха; born 15 September 1987) is a Ukrainian politician and public figure with a background in banking and finance law, as well as in strategic communications.

He was named as one of “100 most influential Ukrainians” in 2024 by NV magazine, and prior to that - in 2021 by Korrespondent magazine, as well as one of the "100 most promising Ukrainian politicians in 2021" by Gazeta.ua magazine.

He is the Chairman of the Economic Affairs Committee of the Parliament of Ukraine, as well as member of parliament of the 9th convocation of the Verkhovna Rada (the Ukrainian parliament), as #14 on the party list of Servant of the People - the party of President Zelensky.

He is active in international politics, serving as member of the Permanent Delegation to the Parliamentary Assembly of the Council of Europe (where he is the treasurer of the European Conservatives Group and member the Committee on Legal Affairs and Human Rights).

== Early life and education ==
Natalukha was born in Moscow, where his father was receiving his master's degree. The family later moved to Rome (Italy), and he completed his secondary education in both Ukrainian and Italian schools. After returning to Ukraine in 2004 he enrolled at the Institute of International Relations of Taras Shevchenko National University of Kyiv, Faculty of International Law, where he specialized in international public law.

In 2010, he graduated as Master of International Law (LL.M.) and interpreter of French language.

His Master's thesis was on "Resolution of territorial disputes in international law" where as an example he took the public political claims of some Russian top politicians on the Crimean peninsula and the city of Sevastopil in particular.

In 2014, he graduated as Master of Philosophy (Master of Philosophy) in International Relations and Politics at the University of Cambridge, where he was a member of Fitzwilliam College.

In Cambridge he specialized in grand strategy, political economy and politics of China. His Master's thesis was on "Problems of the formation of the political elite in Ukraine after 2004".

He also served as chairman of the Cambridge University Ukrainian Society and was the vice-president of his college MCR. While in the UK he wrote analytical materials and articles on developments in Ukraine for Europe's leading research centers.

== Career ==
=== Law, communications and civil service ===
While a student at Taras Shevchenko National University of Kyiv, he started his legal career in leading Ukrainian and international law firms. From 2007 to 2009 he worked in Real Estate, Land Law and International Investments practice at "Spenser & Kauffmann Attorneys at law" in Kyiv. After finishing his master's degree he moved to "Ilyashev and Partners" law firm, where he specialized in international investments, banking and finance, as well as litigation.

From 2011 until 2013, Natalukha worked with Baker McKenzie CIS Limited as member of the banking and finance practice.

In 2013 Natalukha enrolled at the University of Cambridge and moved to the UK, where he was engaged in analysis of international relations and problems of European integration for a number of European think tanks after his graduation.

Back in Ukraine in 2014, Natalukha assumed the office of vice-president of "Right to Protection" - an executive partner office of the United Nations High Commissioner for Refugees, tackling the internally displaced person problem - an unprecedented issue for Ukraine after the outbreak of the Russo-Ukrainian War and the annexation of Crimea by the Russian Federation. His was one of the co-authors and advocates of the Law of Ukraine "On Ensuring the Rights and Freedoms of Internally Displaced Persons".

In 2015, he was appointed by then president of Ukraine Petro Poroshenko as the chairman of the Kominternovsky Raion (later Lyman Raion) of Odesa Oblast. He engaged in public service until 2017.

In 2017, Natalukha founded "Lead/Augury", a strategic communications boutique firm specializing in government relations, public relations, crisis communications, branding and political consulting, where he worked as managing partner before he was elected to the Verkhovna Rada.

=== Parliament of Ukraine ===
On 26 June 2019, the Central Election Commission of Ukraine registered Natalukha as a candidate for deputy from the Servant of the People party, and on 9 August 2019 according to the results of early parliamentary elections in Ukraine in 2019 Natalukha was sworn in as a People's deputy of Ukraine.

In the 9th Ukrainian Verkhovna Rada, he was elected as the chairman of the Economic Affairs Parliamentary Committee.

Focus magazine named him as one of the "Top 10 most efficient Ukrainian MPs" in 2021.

Natalukha is the co-author of a number of critical laws that have been adopted by the Verkhovna Rada, including:

- Law on urgent economic anti-crisis measures to support small and medium business and industry in quarantine caused by COVID-19 pandemic
- Law on localization of industrial production in Ukraine
- Law on industrial parks
- Law on concession
- Law on the demonopolization of the space industry
- Law on the demonopolization of the spirit industry
- Law on the unshadowing of the scrap metal market
- Draft law on business ombudsman

== Ideology and political position ==
Although on numerous occasions Natalukha identified himself as a developmentalist and insisted that "state economic policies shall be to the uttermost pragmatic and not ideology-driven", he called for a return "to a normal, healthy Keynesianism" amidst the COVID-19 pandemic.

He also repeatedly mentioned that he does not believe "in such thing as the invisible hand of the market", called for "healthy economic nationalism - an economy that will be driven by national interests" and stated that some of his legislative initiatives, which are called protectionist, are indeed as such - "yes, this is protectionism, but a protectionism that is beneficial for Ukrainian economy".

In 2021, during an emotional speech from the rostrum of the Verkhovna Rada, he deliberately declared that he is "a lobbyist of industrial parks in Ukraine", as in the first place he is "a lobbyist of economic development of Ukraine", echoing his prior statements that he does not mind being called a lobbyist of industry, "not of a specific company, however, but of processing and of added value in general".

Despite his image of a right-wing nationalist interventionist policy-maker, the Obozrevatel magazine named Natalukha as one of "Top 10 of people who heavily influence the economic policies in Ukraine" in 2021.

== Public activity ==
Natalukha was a participant of Euromaidan and supported the Revolution of Dignity.

He is the chairman and co-founder of the "Ardea Alba" Alumni Club of the Taras Shevchenko National University of Kyiv International Relations Institute. The Club organizes alumni meetings and other events with notable graduates that include Mikheil Saakashvili, Borys Tarasyuk, Volodymyr Ohryzko and others.

In 2015, Natalukha was elected Coordinator of the Professional Government Initiative, an organization that brought together about 2000 foreign-educated Ukrainians.

Natalukha is also the founder of the Ukrainian Institute on Territory Branding, a non-governmental organization designed to reinvent the global image of Ukraine as a country.

== Family ==
He married Alyona Shkrum – 8th and 9th Ukrainian Verkhovna Rada People's Deputy (in the list of "All-Ukrainian Union "Fatherland").
