= Irene Fellin =

Italian politician

Irene Fellin (born 1976, Bolzano) is an Italian expert in gender and security currently serving as the NATO Secretary General's Special Representative for Women, Peace and Security (WPS).

== Education ==
Fellin holds a degree in Cultural Heritage from the Università degli Studi di Parma, and a post graduate diploma in Museology from the École du Louvre in Paris. She later obtained a master's degree in Gender and Women's Studies from the Middle East Technical University, Ankara.

== Career ==
Fellin began her career in 2003 at the Italian Ministry of Foreign Affairs and International Cooperation, working in cultural diplomacy.

From 2006 to 2010, she lived in Turkey, where she completed her master's degree and worked as a gender consultant for several United Nations agencies, including UNDP, UNICEF, as well as for other national and international organizations.

In 2013, Fellin was appointed Advisor to the first NATO Secretary General's Special Representative for Women, Peace and Security, Ambassador Mari Skåre, at NATO Headquarters in Brussels.

In 2014, Fellin became a Senior Researcher at the Istituto Affari Internazionali (IAI). Between 2014 and 2018, she also worked as a trainer on gender and security issues for the Center of Excellence for Stability Police Units in Vicenza, training military personnel, UN peacekeepers, and civilians.

In 2016, Fellin founded Women in International Security (WiIS) Italy, the Italian chapter of a global network dedicated to advancing the leadership and the professional empowerment of women in the field of international peace and security. She currently is the Honorary President.

In 2017, she contributed to the establishment and coordination of the Mediterranean Women Mediators Network (MWMN), an initiative promoted by the Italian Ministry of Foreign Affairs and International Cooperation aimed at increasing the participation of high-level women mediators in peace processes.

Fellin was appointed NATO Secretary General's Special Representative for Women, Peace, and Security in November 2021 for a three-year mandate (2022-2025) under Jens Stoltenberg. Her mandate was subsequently extend for a further term (2025-2028) under Mark Rutte.

During Fellin's tenure, the Women, Peace and Security agenda and the Human Security agenda were included for the first time into NATO Strategic Concept (2022), in which Allies committed to integrating these priorities across all core tasks. She also led the negotiations that resulted in the endorsement of the NATO Women, Peace and Security Policy at the Washington Summit in 2024. Her tenure has included special attention to women in combat following Russia's full-scale invasion of Ukraine.

== Recognitions ==
In 2024, Irene Fellin received the Peacebuilding Award from the Women's Foreign Policy Group in recognition of her work in advancing women's participation in peacebuilding at both local and international levels.

In 2025, Fellin won the Anna Maria Mammoliti Minerva Award in International Relations for her commitment to promoting women's inclusion in international security policy. The Minerva Award is a nongovernmental award established by Italian journalist and social activist Anna Maria Mammoliti in 1983, and is the first Italian award dedicated to women. Every year, the award is presented to women working in different field of knowledge who also serve as female role models, both for their professional skills or for the values they uphold.
