= Edmund F. Arras =

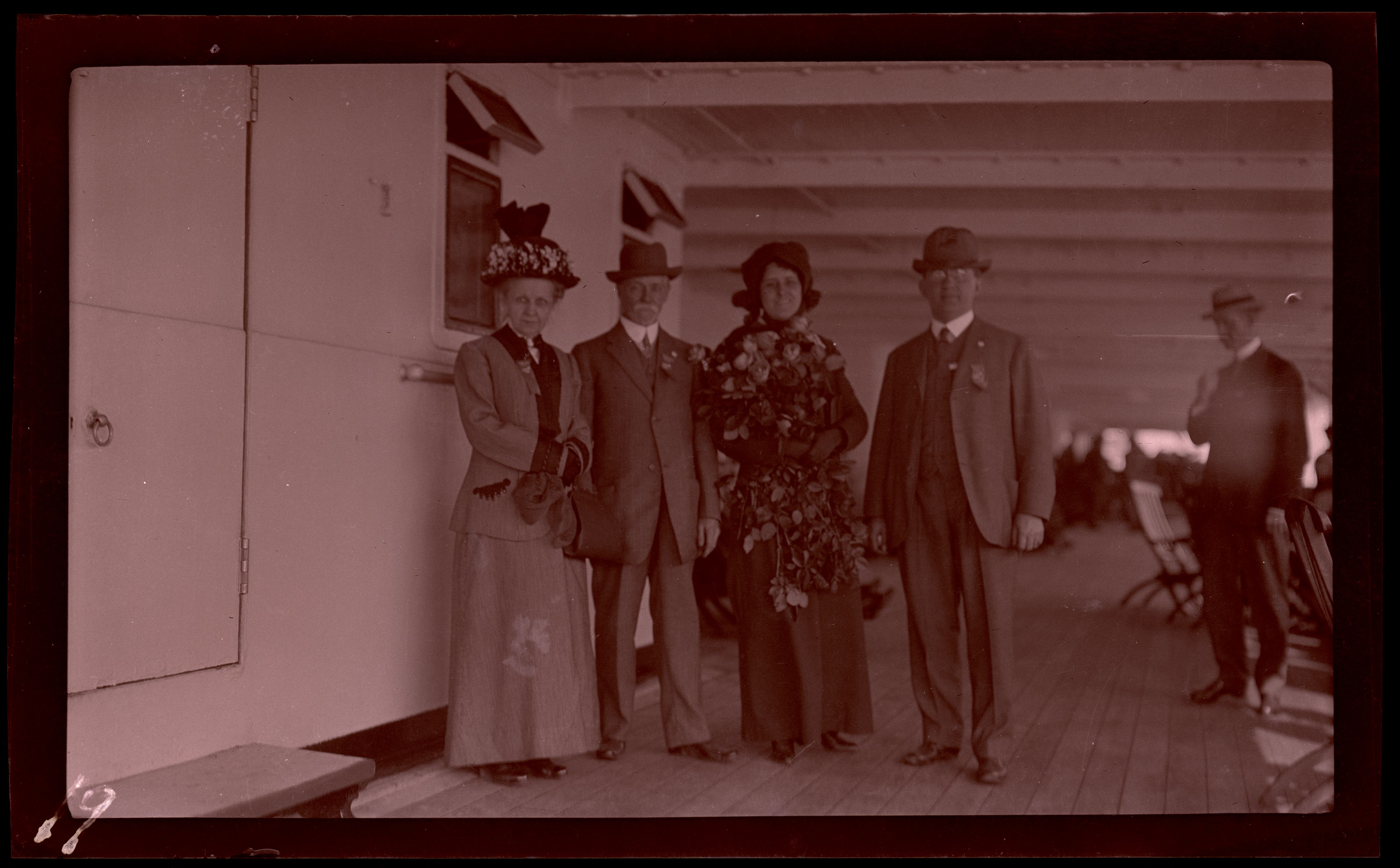
Flora C. Barrett, Edward L. Barrett, Elizabeth Arras and Edmund F. Arras aboard Canopic

Edmund F. Arras (July 7, 1875-October 19, 1951) was a lawyer and real estate businessman who was a leader in Kiwanis International and the Sunday School Association. He took photographs during a months long visit to Europe, Algeria, and Azores in 1913.

He was born in Dayton. His family moved to Columbus where he attended Central High School and Ohio State University Law School, graduating in 1896. Arras established a rental agency in 1891.

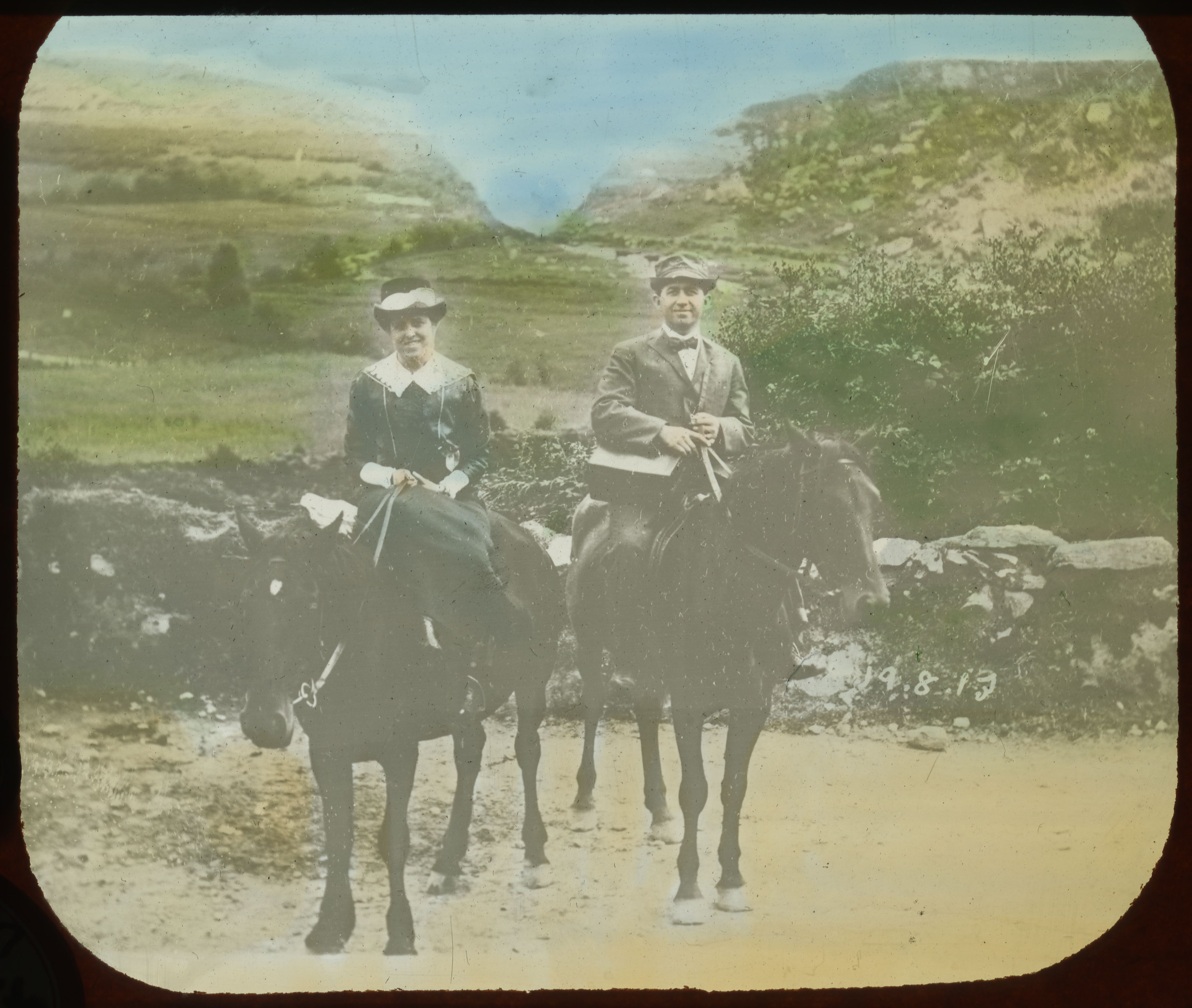
Riding on a tour of the Gap of Dunloe in County Kerry, Ireland

He and his wife were involved with Kiwanis and traveled to Europe in 1913 for a Sunday School Association conference. He took photos of their extended journey documenting their travels.

He was elected president of the Kiwanis International in 1923 and served in 1924. A glass negative was taken of fim in 1924. As president he travelled to every U.S. state and Canadian province.

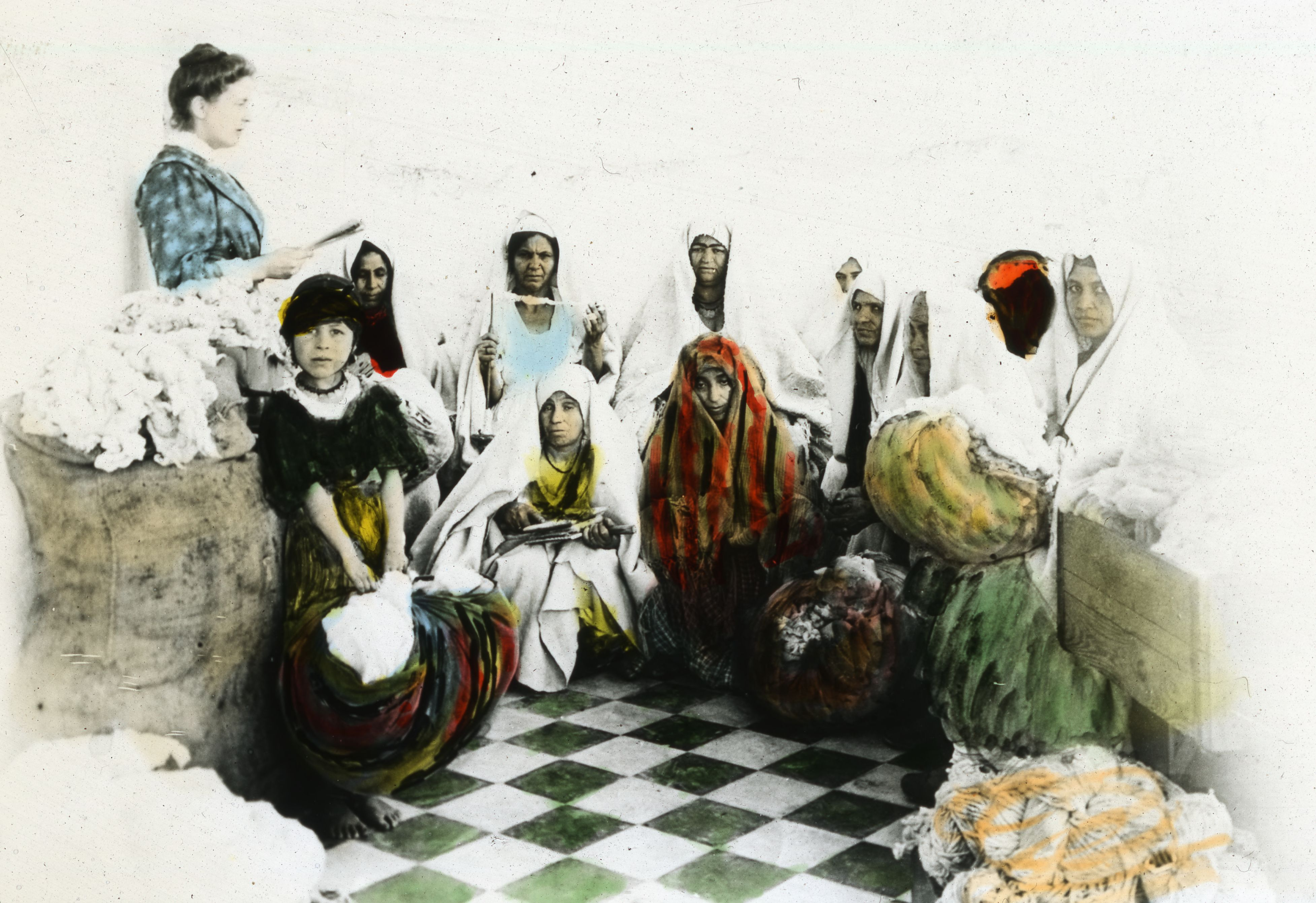
Methodist missionary and local women in Algiers, Algeria

He was married to Elizabeth née McDermott Arras (died 1969). They lived for several years at 1653 Bryden Road. An episode of WOSU's Ohio Snapshots in Time explored their lives and photographs of pre-World War I Europe and sites in the U.S. He left 4,000 negatives, lantern slides, and photographs as well as maps documenting his travels.
