= Joint session =

Meeting of two houses in a bicameral legislature

A joint session or joint convention is, most broadly, when two normally separate decision-making groups meet, often in a special session or other extraordinary meeting, for a specific purpose.

Most often it refers to when both houses of a bicameral legislature sit together. A joint session typically occurs to receive foreign or domestic diplomats or leaders, or to allow both houses to consider bills together.

Some constitutions give special power to a joint session, voting by majority of all members of the legislature regardless of which house or chamber they belong to. For example, in Switzerland a joint session of the two houses elects the members of the Federal Council (cabinet). In India, disputes between houses are resolved by a joint sitting but without an intervening election.

== Australia ==
In the Parliament of Australia, a joint sitting can be held, under certain conditions, to overcome a deadlock between the two houses. For a deadlock to be declared, a bill has to be rejected twice by the Senate at an interval of at least three months, after which a double dissolution election can be held. If, following the election, the new parliament is still unable to pass the bill, it may be considered by a joint sitting of the House of Representatives and the Senate, and must achieve an absolute majority of the total number of members and senators in order to pass. The only example of this occurring was the Joint Sitting of the Australian Parliament of 1974 under the Whitlam Labor government, at which six deadlocked bills were passed.

Because the House has twice as many members as the Senate, the former has an advantage in a joint sitting. However, the voting system used for the Senate before 1949, which might be called "multiple at-large voting", often led to landslide if not wipe-out results in each state, resulting in a winning margin over the whole of Australia of up to 36–0. That would have given the party or grouping enjoying such a large Senate majority an advantage in any joint sitting, had there been one.

The voting system now used for the Senate, quota-preferential proportional representation, almost inevitably leads to very evenly divided results. Six senators are elected from each state and two from each territory. A party or grouping has to get at least 57% of the vote in any State to obtain a four-two majority of seats in that state, whereas from 51% to 56% of the vote yields only an equality of three seats to each major party or group.

== Austria ==
The Federal Assembly is a formal joint session of the two houses of the bicameral Austrian Parliament, to swear the elected President of Austria into office.

== Belgium ==
The Chamber of Representatives and the Senate convene as United Chambers (Dutch: Verenigde Kamers; French: Chambres réunies; German: Vereinigten Kammern) to swear the King into office, as stipulated by article 91 of the Constitution.

== Canada ==
The Canadian government procedure is called a joint address, with the members of the House of Commons attending the Senate as guests. There is no procedure in Canada for both chambers of the Parliament to sit in a true joint session.

Various government agencies and non-governmental organizations may also meet jointly to handle problems which each of the involved parties has a stake in.

== France ==
The Congress of the French Parliament is an assembly of both houses of the French Parliament, convened at the Palace of Versailles, which can approve certain amendments to the constitution by a three-fifths majority of all members. Since 2008, the Congress may also be convened to hear an address from the President of the Republic.

== Germany ==
The Federal Convention elects the President of Germany. It includes members from the Bundestag and representatives of the States of Germany.

== India ==
In India, if an ordinary bill has been rejected by any house of the parliament and if more than six months have elapsed, the President may summon a joint session for purpose of passing the bill. The bill is passed by a simple majority of a joint sitting. Since the lower house (Lok Sabha) has more than twice the members of the upper house (Rajya Sabha), a group commanding a majority in the lower house of the Government of India can often pass such a bill even if it was previously rejected by the upper house.

So far, joint Session of the Parliament of India has been called for only three bills that have been passed at joint sessions: the Dowry Prohibition Act, 1961, the Banking Service Commission Repeal Bill, 1978, and the Prevention of Terrorism Act, 2002.

== Ireland ==
Joint sittings of Dáil Éireann and Seanad Éireann, the two houses of the Oireachtas, have been held for ceremonial purposes. Most cases are addresses to the Oireachtas, usually by the President of Ireland under Article 13.7.1° of the Constitution or by a foreign leader on a state visit. In 2017, a joint sitting addressed by Michel Barnier regarding Brexit negotiations was described as an "exchange of views" and proceeded as a committee of the whole. There was a joint sitting in 2019 to mark the centenary of the First Dáil. The Governor-General of the Irish Free State made addresses in 1922 and 1923 akin to the speech from the throne in other Commonwealth Dominions; each was not a joint sitting but rather a sitting of the Free State Dáil with Free State Senators present.

== Philippines ==
In the Philippines, Congress can convene in a joint session for the following:

- To declare the existence of a state of war
- Canvassing of votes after a presidential election
- Every State of the Nation Address
- Revocation or extension of the
  - Proclamation of martial law, or
  - Suspension of the privilege of the writ of habeas corpus

While the State of the Nation Address takes place annually, and presidential elections occur every six years, the only instances when the other two conditions were met post the approval of the 1987 constitution were following the declaration of martial law in Maguindanao after the Maguindanao massacre in 2009, and in Mindanao after the Marawi crisis in 2017 and 2018.

Special joint sessions can also be convened to facilitate visiting foreign leaders' addresses to Congress.

Joint sessions are typically held at the seat of the House of Representatives, which is at the Batasang Pambansa Complex, Quezon City.

== United Kingdom ==
English and later British monarchs have jointly addressed the House of Commons and the House of Lords since the 16th century. Since 1939, foreign heads of state and dignitaries have been invited to address both houses of Parliament, the first to do so was French President Albert Lebrun in March 1939.

The speech from the throne upon the State Opening of Parliament is made before a joint sitting of both Houses. This occurs in the House of Lords, the upper chamber, due to the constitutional convention that the monarch never enters the House of Commons. The closing of each of parliamentary session is also marked by a speech to both Houses.

== United States ==
The State of the Union Address of the president of the United States is traditionally made before a "joint session" of the United States Congress. Many states refer to an analogous event as a "joint convention". Such assemblies are typically held in the chamber of the lower house as the larger body. State constitutions of U.S. states may require joint conventions for other purposes; for example Tennessee's requires such to elect the secretary of state, the state treasurer, and the comptroller of the treasury.

The first foreign dignitary to address a joint session of Congress was Ambassador André de La Boulaye of France who addressed a joint session on May 20, 1934.

== See also ==
- Joint committee
- Special session
