= National Party (Ireland, 2016) =

Irish political party

The National Party An Páirtí Náisiúnta
- Leader: Gerry Kinneavy
- Deputy leader: Yan Mac Oireachtaigh
- Founders: Justin Barrett; James Reynolds
- Founded: 16 November 2016
- Headquarters: Mespil House, Sussex Road, Dublin 4
- Youth wing: Óige Náisiúnach (Nationalist Youth)
- Ideology: Irish nationalism; Social conservatism; Remigration; Anti-abortion; Anti-immigration; Euroscepticism
- Political position: Far-right
- National affiliation: National Alliance (2024–2025)
- Colours: Dark green White
- Slogan: Ar dheis ar aghaidh! ('Forward and to the Right!') 'Ireland Belongs to the Irish'

Website
- nationalparty.ie

The National Party (Irish: An Páirtí Náisiúnta) is a minor far-right political party in Ireland. The party was founded in 2016 and, as of 2026, the party's leader was Gerry Kinneavy. The National Party, which has no representation at local or national level, is the largest far-right party in Ireland.

== History ==
=== Formation ===
The party was founded in 2016 by Justin Barrett as party president and James Reynolds as party vice president. The National Party had planned to hold its press launch in the Merrion Hotel in Dublin but the event was cancelled by the hotel, which subsequently said it had done so for "public safety reasons". There had been much adverse reaction online to the announcement of the launch.

Barrett, who was raised in County Tipperary, has a background in anti-abortion and anti-immigration politics, formerly being a leading figure in Youth Defence and campaigning against the Treaty of Nice. Barrett attracted media attention due to his participation in events in both Germany and Italy organised by far-right parties, the National Democratic Party and Forza Nuova, respectively, in the 1990s. Barrett denied sharing their far-right views and said he attended these events in his capacity as an anti-abortion campaigner. In 2016, in an interview where he incorrectly overstated the levels of migration to Ireland by a factor of three, he called his attendance at these meetings "a mistake".

Reynolds, from County Longford, was the County Longford affiliate for Youth Defence in the early 1990s. He was associated with the Libertas Ireland political party in 2009, and campaigned for a No vote in the Fiscal Compact referendum in 2012 as chairman of the small Farmers for No group. Reynolds was previously the Longford county chairman of the Irish Farmers' Association, and national treasurer of the Irish Cattle and Sheep Farmers Association. He was suspended from the IFA in 2012 for "bringing the county executive into disrepute". In March 2017 he secured a temporary High Court injunction preventing his dismissal as national treasurer of the ICSA, but the High Court upheld his dismissal from the role in June 2017.

The party held its first Ardfheis in November 2017, at the Trump International Golf Links and Hotel Ireland in County Clare. Approximately 50 delegates attended. Barrett criticised Fine Gael in his speech for not calling its annual conference an ardfheis. John Wilson, a guest speaker from County Cavan, challenged homophobic comments made by deputy leader James Reynolds. Barrett defended Reynolds' comments and reportedly answered in the affirmative when asked by Wilson whether the National Party was "only for straight Irish people". Wilson then walked out in protest.

=== Referendums ===
The party has been involved in campaigning in Irish referendums. It formed Abortion Never in March 2018 to campaign for a 'No' vote in the 2018 referendum to legislate for abortion. Abortion Never presented itself as "an Irish nationalist anti-abortion campaign." At the launch of the campaign, Barrett stated that if the abortion referendum passed, it would lead to euthanasia for the elderly; "It doesn't just begin with abortion and stop there. It ends in euthanasia, because they already have a plan. You see discussions in the newspapers sometimes, 'What are we going to do about the pensions crisis?'". At the same event, he called for the abortion referendum campaign to be "as divisive as possible". The referendum was ultimately approved by 66.4% of voters.

In November 2020, the Standards in Public Office Commission (SIPO) announced that the National Party were one of five political parties who failed to provide them with a set of audited accounts for 2019, in breach of statutory obligations. SIPO later reported that the National Party had never filed any audited accounts or details of party finances, despite a legal obligation to do so.

The party supported a 'No' vote in the March 2024 referendums on family and carers. The party's application to become an 'approved body' during the campaign was rejected by the Electoral Commission due to the contested nature of the party's leadership.

=== Protests ===
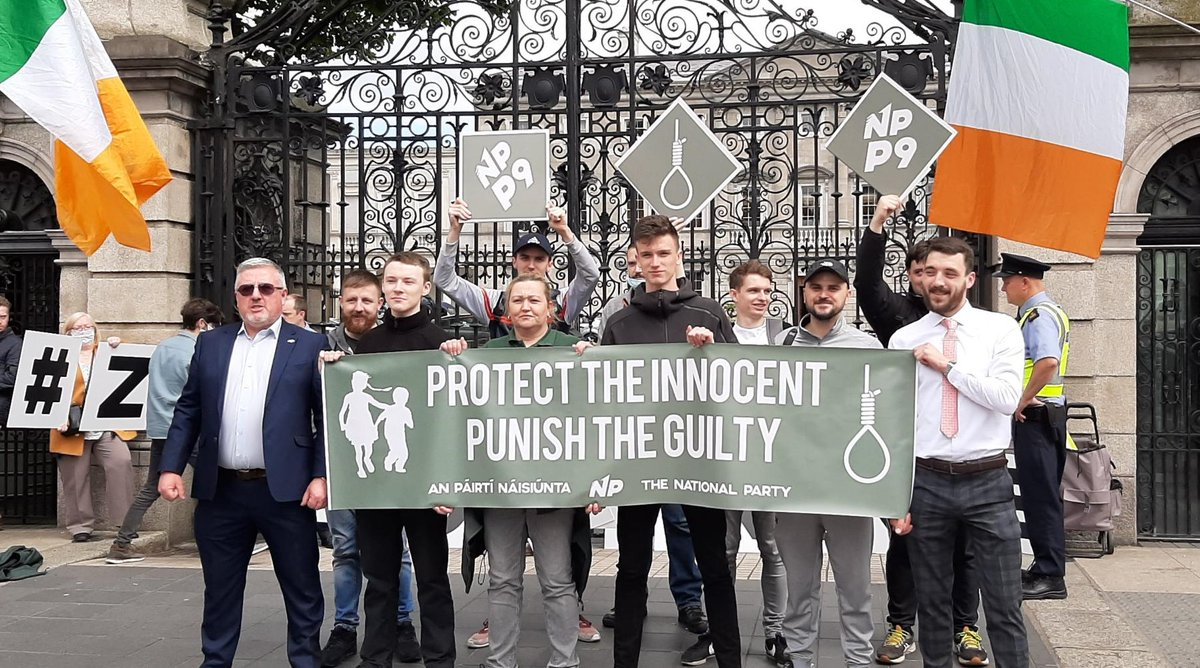
Members of the National Party holding up a banner and signs containing noose imagery during a protest directed at Roderic O'Gorman in Dublin in July 2020

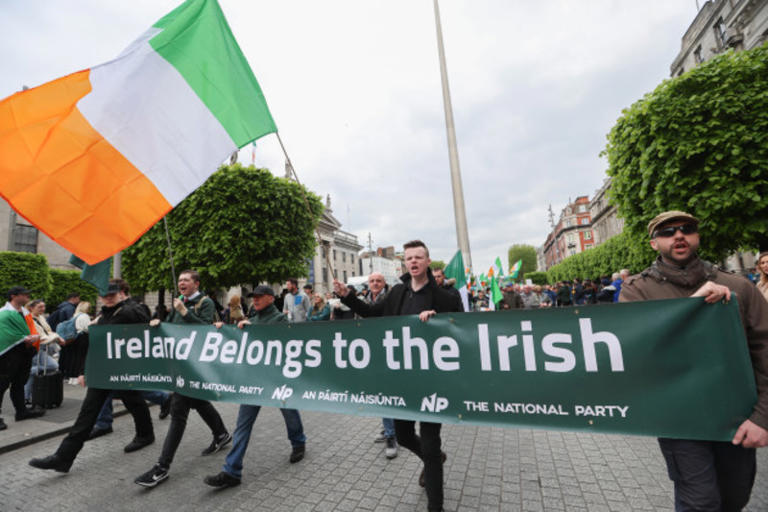
National Party members at an anti-immigration protest in Dublin in May 2024

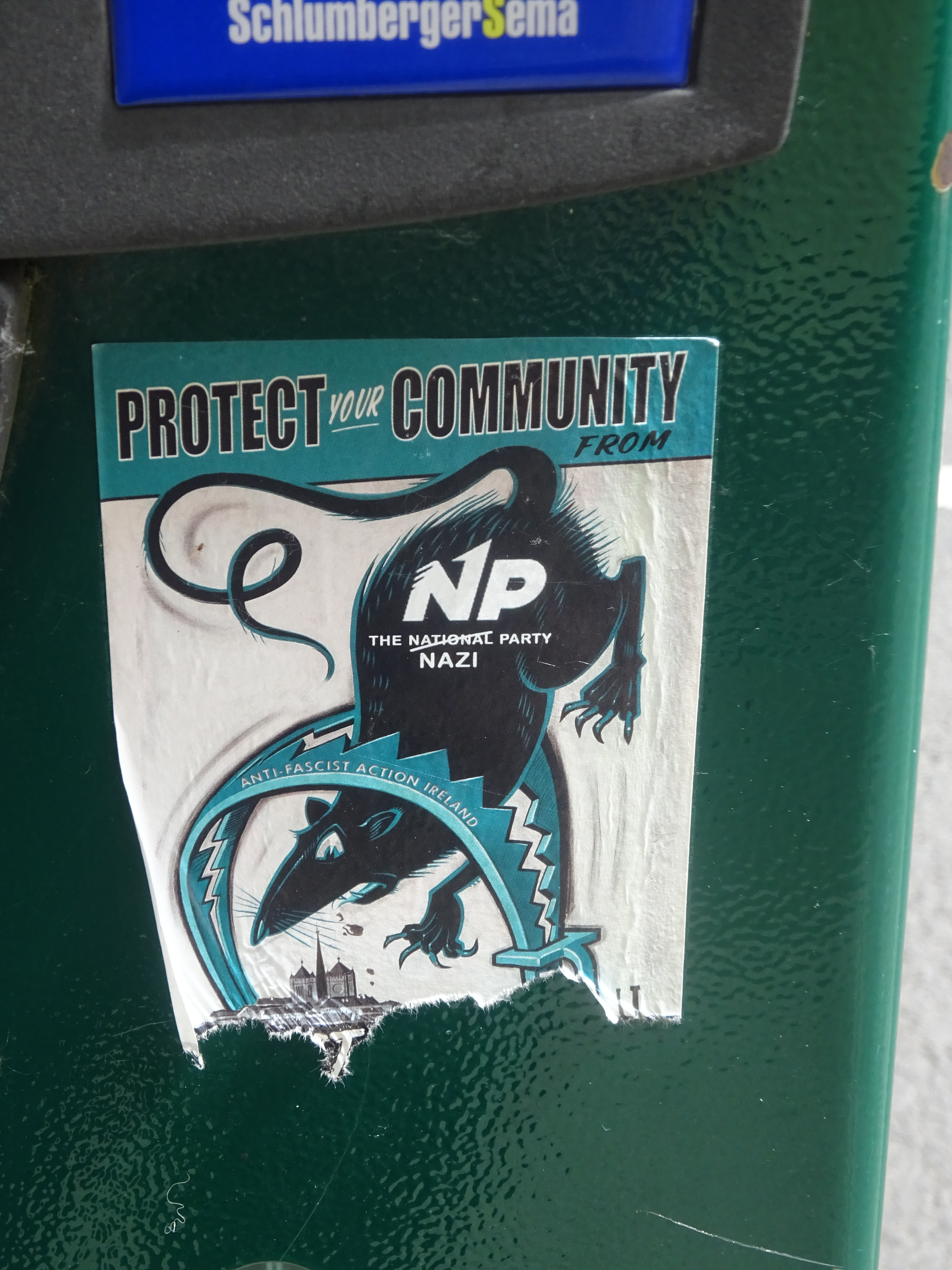
Anti-National Party sticker in Longford

In September 2019, party president Justin Barrett had a milkshake thrown over him when he along with other members the National Party were confronted by counter-protesters after unfurling a banner reading 'Ireland belongs to the Irish' in Galway.

During the COVID-19 pandemic in the Republic of Ireland, members of the National Party participated in several anti-mask and anti-lockdown protests. There were violent clashes at several events promoted and attended by party members in October 2020 and February 2021.

In July 2020, the National Party organised a protest against Minister for Children Roderic O'Gorman, who they accused of being sympathetic to paedophiles. During that protest, members of the party unfurled a banner and signs depicting a noose. Actor John Connors, who had attended the protest, subsequently issued a public apology (which O'Gorman accepted) in which Connors stated that he had allowed himself "to lead and be part of an online frenzy that cast hurtful and false assertions" on O'Gorman's character.

At an anti-mask protest held on 12 September 2020, a National Party member, Michael Quinn, assaulted LGBTQ+ activist Izzy Kamikaze with a wooden plank wrapped in the Irish flag, while she was observing the protest. In June 2021, Quinn pleaded guilty to assault using a weapon under Section 11 of the Firearms and Offensives Weapons Act, 1990. The party leadership has made no public comment on the assault or conviction. In the wake of the original assault, far-right social media accounts had claimed the victim had faked her injuries.

Representatives of the party attending the 2022–2023 anti-immigration protests across Ireland has been widely reported.

Members of the party were involved in an "anti-government" protest, held outside Leinster House, in September 2023. The party has featured prominently in protests, including leading street blockades against buses of refugees.

The party described the November 2023 Dublin riot as "spontaneous", "organic", and an eruption of "righteous anger". A party spokesperson stated: "Whilst the National Party does not endorse any illegal activity, yesterday evening's events were an outburst of passion in response to overt injustice... Ireland's open borders immigration policy has allowed the dregs of foreign countries to settle in Ireland, often being entitled to housing and welfare whilst Irish people struggle."

Councillor Patrick Quinlan spoke on behalf of the party at the April 2025 anti-immigration 'National Protest' in Dublin, held to commemorate the Easter Rising. He spoke alongside Dublin councillors Malachy Steenson, Gavin Pepper, and Philip Sutcliffe. Quinlan spoke against what he described as "the den of rats inside Dáil Éireann". He continued, "They fear not chaos but our awakening... the holy fire that blazed in our patriot dead lives on here today. The heroes of 1916 triumphed, and so shall we.” At a June 2025 protest, Quinlan accused the Irish government of being "traitors akin to the former British colonial overlords".

=== 2022 Ard Fheis ===
The party's annual Ard Fheis held in the Lough Erne Resort, County Fermanagh was disrupted by a group of far-left protesters who arrived by minibus, some of whom were armed with hammers and covered their faces with scarves and balaclavas. A fire extinguisher was also used by a member of the anti-fascist group as a weapon. Two people were treated at the scene for their injuries and four others were taken to hospital following the incident. One protester, Daniel Comerford from Dublin, was arrested and charged with having a hammer as an offensive weapon, causing criminal damage to a glass door, attempting to cause grievous bodily harm and affray.

The party Ard Fheis continued shortly after the disturbance. In his speech, the then deputy leader, James Reynolds, condemned the attack on the conference by "red communist thugs". In a subsequent statement, the party said: "The far-left in Ireland feel entitled to bludgeon people...Why? Because the NGO sector and media establishment give it moral sanction. The same people demand 'hate speech' legislation to create a two-tier justice system where they are on top."

=== 2023–2025 leadership dispute ===
In late July 2023, Justin Barrett made public allegations on social media that "gold reserves" valued at €400,000 (Note: Based on the price of gold, this indicates a mass of about 7 kilograms (230 ozt).) owned by the National Party had been "stolen from a vault" by party members including deputy leader James Reynolds. The matter was reported to An Garda Síochána, however Gardaí did not commence a criminal investigation as they sought to establish legal ownership of the gold. It was reported that Gardaí had determined the location of gold. A Garda source described the matter as "an internal party dispute" and as one for the civil courts. The Gardaí later dismissed Barrett's allegations of theft. Barrett stated that the gold "formed the main part of the party's reserves in case of a mishap in general or more particularly a collapse in the value of fiat currency". He claimed to have expelled Reynolds and the other members. It was later reported by the Irish Times that "only a fraction of the gold" was owned by the party, with the remainder belonging to "senior party members".

The origin of the gold raised concern from politicians such as Senator Michael McDowell and Fine Gael councillor Emma Blain. Blain’s complaint, on the source of the party's funding and its failure to publish accounts, prompted the Standards in Public Office Commission (SIPO) to pledge to investigate, stating that concerns "will be followed up to ensure proper compliance with the requirements of the Electoral Acts. All matters relating to possible noncompliance with the requirements of the Electoral Acts that are brought to the attention of the Commission, are followed up and enquiries made as appropriate". SIPO further stated that, if they were of the opinion that an offence had occurred, "it may refer the matter to the Director of Public Prosecutions".

The National Party issued a statement on 31 July 2023 on its official social media channels in which it stated that Barrett had been removed as leader in mid-July, before "claims emerged that gold bars worth an estimated €400,000 had been removed from a party vault". The Electoral Commission received a request from the Reynolds-led faction to remove Barrett's name from the register of political parties and to change the party's headquarters address ten days before Barrett contacted the Electoral Commission. The party's statement of 31 July claimed that Barrett was dismissed "due to an overwhelming lack of confidence from active party members in Mr Barrett's continued ability to lead the party" and that Reynolds had been elected as leader. It criticised Barrett's "hands-off leadership style" which had "allowed the party to go to seed". Barrett denied being removed as leader and claimed the statement was "farcical" and blamed it on "social media password possession" by the faction which had ousted him. He further claimed it was issued by someone who "never read the National Party Constitution or... does not know it is lodged with the Electoral Commission and is legally enforceable" and said he was still "President of the National Party in law". Since July 2023, both Reynolds and Barrett made further submissions to the Electoral Commission. A decision on which faction could use the National Party name in elections was reportedly expected in February 2024.

In September 2023, Reynolds dismissed Barrett as a "disgruntled ex-leader" and a "beaten docket" in an interview with the Sunday Independent. The party also accused Barrett of having "greedily use[d] the party's funds for selfish reasons" when he was leader, including the use of €13,000 to purchase himself a car. The Irish Times reported that Barrett's posting of a quote from Mein Kampf and his decision to expel Philip Dwyer "raised questions about his judgement" among party members and that the "bulk of the party's support base appears to have deserted him" and "only a small handful of party members, including his wife, are standing by him".

Since the split with Barrett, the Reynolds-led faction continued to hold meetings, including an annual general meeting held on 16 December 2023 in Portlaoise, County Laois. This annual general meeting elected nine members to the party's "national directorate". On 28 January 2024, the national directorate reconstituted itself the Ard Chomhairle and elected Reynolds as leader and Patrick Quinlan as deputy leader. The party announced its intention to contest the 2024 European and 2024 local elections in June 2024.

In February 2024, it was reported that the party had failed in its bid to be granted "approved body" status in referendums. The refusal to grant the status was linked to the ongoing confusion about which faction of the party had the right to use the party name.

In April 2024, Barrett formed a new organisation called 'Clann Éireann' (Irish for 'Family Ireland'), though he insisted it was not a political party, and that he had not conceded the leadership of the National Party to Reynolds. He used the organisation to attack the Reynolds-led faction within the National Party, and rallied support for his side in the leadership dispute.

As of April 2024, the leadership was still in dispute, with competing submissions being made to the Electoral Commission. Both factions ran candidates in the June 2024 European elections, with two candidates each running in the Dublin and Midlands-Northwest constituencies. Both Barrett and Reynolds ran unsuccessfully in the latter constituency. One councillor, Patrick Quinlan, was elected to Fingal County Council in the local elections. Following the June 2024 elections, Reynolds described the National Party brand as "toxic" and said he would never run for them again.

In September 2024, the Electoral Commission issued a final ruling on the leadership dispute, stating that both Barrett and Reynolds remained officers. It stated that "The Board was not satisfied that reasonable notice was given of the relevant meeting of the party's National Directorate, and that the resolutions made at that meeting were therefore not validly made," further stating that the meeting called to remove Barrett was attended by only one person, namely James Reynolds. The fate of the gold bullion was not mentioned in the decision.

In March 2025, the Electoral Commission processed another application to amend the Register of Political Parties, removing Barrett as a party officer and changing the party's registered headquarters to a Dublin 4 address. Barrett appealed against this decision, which was "under consideration" by the Electoral Commission as of March 2025.

In September 2025, the Electoral Commission rejected an appeal by Barrett to prevent his removal from the party on foot of an AGM held on 19 October 2024. The body rejected his claims of a "coup" and that the AGM was "rigged" against him or his supporters. Following this, the National Party stated that Patrick Quinlan was the president of the party. The Register of Political Parties was subsequently updated, on 24 September 2025, to reflect the removal of Barrett and Reynolds and the inclusion of Quinlan. Galway Bay FM described Barrett as having been "deposed" as leader.

=== National Alliance and 2024 general election ===
Ahead of the November 2024 Irish general election, the National Party, along with The Irish People and Ireland First, formed the short-lived National Alliance. The grouping said its purpose was to "uphold the principles that put the Irish people and their needs first, standing firm in the battle between globalism and nationalism". The alliance announced a leadership consisting of Ireland First leader Derek Blighe, the Irish People leader Anthony Cahill, and National Party councillor Patrick Quinlan.

Ahead of the election, the National Party announced that Stardust campaigner and survivor Antoinette Keegan would stand for the party and was "committed to implementing the National Party's pro-Irish position". However, Keegan subsequently stated that she had withdrawn as a National Party candidate and from the election and that her "principles are 'incompatible' with the party".

The National Alliance promoted policies which were anti-abortion, anti-green and anti-immigration. It failed to win any seats in the general election. In February 2025, the National Party announced that the National Alliance was "defunct", citing "unexpected ideological and political differences."

=== Quinlan leadership, 2025–2026 ===
The leadership of Patrick Quinlan was confirmed in Autumn 2025. Quinlan, who had reportedly been attracted to the party by its anti-abortion policy, was involved in the anti-immigration protests in Coolock in 2024.

According to Eoin Lenihan in his book Vandalising Ireland (2025), since the split with its co-founders, the National Party has "attempted to rehabilitate its brand by affiliating with pan-European identitarian ideology" undertaken by a "younger, more aesthetically savvy" faction which has dominated the party since 2024. Conor Gallagher of the The Irish Times described Quinlan as one of "a younger cohort of far-right activists" within the party who "ousted and replaced" Barrett. Under Quinlan's leadership, the party "continued to move rightwards" and "continued to court younger voters".

In January 2026, the National Party's Galway representative Gerry Kinneavy was elected as deputy leader to Quinlan. Kinneavy, from Oughterard in Connemara, was formerly the secretary of the Immigration Control Platform in the 2000s.

In the 2026 Galway West by-election, the party endorsed the candidacy of A.J. Cahill, leader of the Irish People party. Cahill received less than 2% of first preferences (890 votes) and was eliminated on the second count.

Quinlan resigned as leader of the National Party in June 2026. In August 2026, he was replaced as leader by Gerry Kinneavy. Yan Mac Oireachtaigh became deputy leader. Quinlan reportedly resigned from the party, entirely, in October 2026.

== Ideology and policies ==
Descriptions of the National Party in the press have ranged from it being right wing to far-right. In August 2022, the Global Project against Hate and Extremism published a report on the growth of far-right and hate groups in Ireland. The report stated that "white nationalist, anti-LGBTQ+, anti-immigrant, and anti-lockdown groups seem to be coming together and echoing each other's hateful rhetoric" and identified 12 far-right groups, including the National Party, that had experienced growth in recent years. The National Party was included due to its "anti-immigrant, anti-LGBTQ+, and white nationalist" stances. In 2016, the party published a set of "Nine Principles", which espoused a nationalist, anti-abortion, Eurosceptic and anti-immigration platform. As of 2025, the party has published a set of 11 principles on its website, including an intention to restore the Irish language and a sovereign, debt-free national currency.

=== Immigration ===
The main plank of the National Party programme is its opposition to immigration. It has stated that the housing crisis can be solved by "the deportation of people seeking asylum." It has campaigned on the slogan "House the Irish, Not the World".

In contrast with other parties, the National Party's messaging on immigration has prioritised "the importance of an Irish identity". They argued this comes "from a shared history and culture, and was threatened by those of different backgrounds." Its opposition to immigration has been described as "philosophical", primarily rooted in "promoting Irish history, heritage, culture, and identity" rather than in material concerns such as safety and housing.

=== Remigration ===
In 2025, the party moved to become the main proponents of remigration in Ireland, a far-right policy popular among the European far-right which advocates the repatriation of immigrants. National Party members marched with a banner reading "Aisimirce Anois! Remigration Now" at a protest in April 2025.

=== Economics ===
The party favours the establishment of a new national bank independent of "international finance capitalism" and exiting the Euro currency.

=== Agriculture ===
The party is opposed to the EU Green Deal. Reynolds stated the party opposes the EU Nature Restoration Law, calling it "an assault on rural Ireland and an assault on the farming sector".

=== Islam ===
In 2016, Barrett called for a complete ban on Muslims entering Ireland and for greater vetting efforts to be made, stating that "all of them are potentially dangerous", though he later clarified that he does not believe Ireland needs a complete ban on Muslims entering the country. The party also favours racial profiling.

=== European Union ===
The party supports a renegotiation of Ireland's relationship with the EU, including a withdrawal from the Eurozone. The party has not endorsed an explicit policy of 'Irexit', but supports a withdrawal from the European Union, which it described as "dictatorial", if it cannot be reformed into a Europe of free nations.

=== Irish unification ===
The party supports the Republic of Ireland making an irredentist claim on Northern Ireland. It supports "the unification of Ireland in one sovereign and independent republic." The first of its principles is copied from the old Article 2 of the Irish Constitution: "The National Party believes that the territory of Ireland consists of the whole island of Ireland, its islands and the territorial seas." It continues, the party "is committed to pursuing Irish unity, as well as defending Irish territorial seas from foreign encroachment. The party is opposed to the holding of a border poll, describing such a referendum as making Irish unity dependent on the "temporary whim of an electorate". Instead, it supports "a negotiated settlement between the south and the north to achieve sovereignty and independence."

=== Law and order ===
The party advocates the reintroduction of the death penalty for "particularly heinous crimes". It has accused the judiciary of being "excessively lenient" with regards to the illegal drug trade, sexual assaults, child pornography and violent crimes. It opposes the decriminalisation of drugs and the use of supervised injection centres.

=== Social issues ===
The National Party has been described as "socially conservative" and having emerged "from the pro-life movement".

The party opposes same-sex marriage, stating that it is "against gay marriage, but not gay people". In 2016, Barrett described marriage equality as a "sham" and "not natural."

The party is anti-abortion. Before the 2018 abortion referendum, it called for the repeal of the Protection of Life During Pregnancy Act 2013, whilst Barrett referred to the X Case as "obtuse". During the 2018 abortion referendum, the party campaigned for a No vote with its front group 'Abortion Never'. The party has attended the annual Rally for Life in Dublin.

=== International relations ===
Internationally, the party has links with the Estonian Conservative People's Party. It has also expressed solidarity with the Afrikaners in South Africa. In 2025, a National Party representative attended a conference organised by the Norgesdemokratene in Norway.

== Leadership ==
Name	Portrait	Period
Justin Barrett		2016–2023
Disputed between Justin Barrett and James Reynolds		c. 2023–2025
Patrick Quinlan		2025–2026
Gerry Kinneavy		2026–

== Elections ==
In April 2019, the party was added to the Register of Political Parties for Dáil, local and European elections, but did not field candidates in the 2019 local elections or 2019 European elections.

The National Party contested an election for the first time at the 2020 general election. It put forward ten candidates, although party leader Justin Barrett did not run himself. No candidates were elected, with a share of first preference votes between 0.49% (224 votes) and 1.74% (983 votes) in their respective constituencies. Party vice president, James Reynolds, received the best result of any party candidate, with 1.74% of first preference votes (983 votes) in the Longford–Westmeath constituency.

Justin Barrett stood in the 2021 Dublin Bay South by-election. He received 176 votes, 0.67% of the first preference votes, a significant decrease on previous election results. He was eliminated after the third count.

In the 2024 local elections the party stood nine candidates and had one elected. Patrick Quinlan was elected to Fingal County Council. He is the first elected representative for the party. In the concurrent European Parliament elections, the party stood four candidates in two constituencies but did not win a seat.

In the 2024 general election, the party fielded nine candidates. They stood as part of the National Alliance alongside Ireland First, The Irish People, and various independents.

=== Election results ===
==== Dáil Éireann ====
Election	Seats won	±	Position	First Pref votes	%	Government	Leader
2020	0 / 160	Steady	12th	4,773	0.2	No seats	Justin Barrett
2021 by-election	0 / 1	Steady	11th	183	0.7	No seats	Justin Barrett
2024	0 / 174	Steady	13th	6,511	0.3	No seats	Disputed

==== European Parliament ====
Election	Leader	1st pref Votes	%	Seats	+/−	EP Group
2024	Disputed	12,879	0.74 (#14)	0 / 14	New	−

==== Local elections ====
Election	Seats won	±	First pref. votes	%
2024	1 / 949	▲1	4,983	0.3%

== See also ==
- Identity Ireland
- Renua
- Irish Freedom Party
