= Irish Freedom Party =

Irish political party

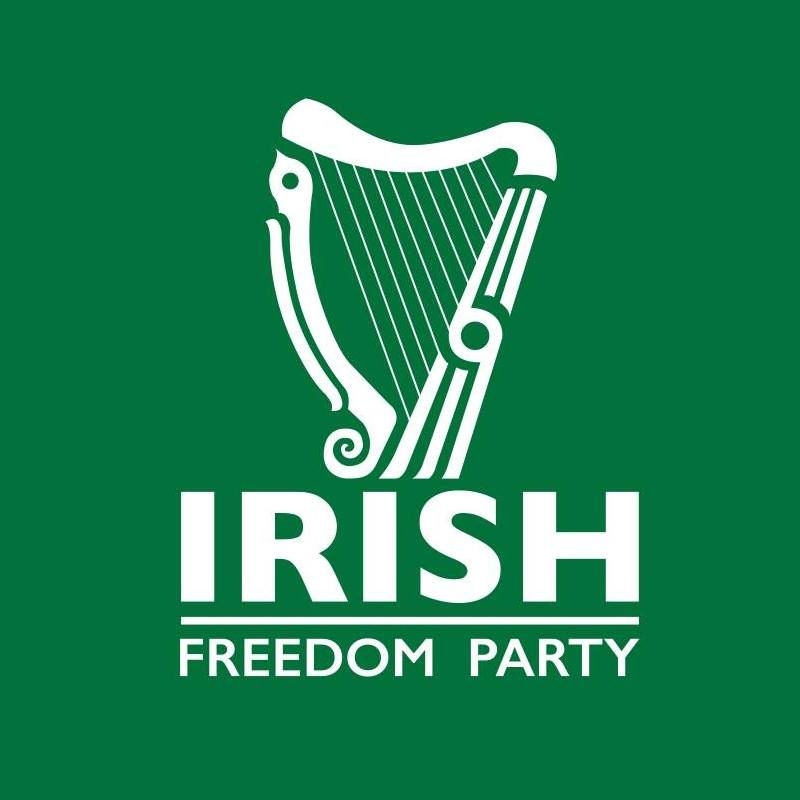
- Leader: Hermann Kelly (2018-2025); Disputed (2025-2026)
- Founder: Hermann Kelly
- Founded: 8 September 2018
- Ideology: Direct democracy Hard Euroscepticism; Right-wing populism Irish nationalism Anti-immigration
- Political position: Far-right
- Colours: Dark green White

Website
- irishfreedom.ie theirishfreedomparty.com

The Irish Freedom Party sometimes referred to as IFP and initially known as the Irexit Freedom To Prosper Party, is a minor unregistered far-right, hard Eurosceptic political party in Ireland, launched on 8 September 2018. It has advocated Irish withdrawal from the European Union. The party was founded by Hermann Kelly, former director of communications for Europe of Freedom and Direct Democracy.

As of October 2025, the leadership of the party was disputed between a faction associated with Hermann Kelly and an executive body chaired by Michael Leahy. In June 2026, the Electoral Commission announced its intention to cancel the party's inclusion in the Register of Political Parties, owing to "conflicting claims" in "two separate applications" and a failure to meet the requirements of the Electoral Reform Act 2022.

== History ==
=== Formation ===
On 3 February 2018 an 'Irexit' conference was held in the Royal Dublin Society in Dublin, advocating an Irish withdrawal from the European Union. It was attended by former UKIP leader Nigel Farage, author and columnist John Waters and academics Anthony Coughlan and Karen Devine. Approximately 600 people attended.

On 8 September 2018, a conference was held in the Bonnington Hotel in Dublin to launch the new party. Independent guest speakers at the launch included former Ambassador of Ireland to Canada Ray Bassett, and Professor Ray Kinsella, a University College Dublin economist. Approximately 400 people attended the event.

Following its launch, the party held several regional public meetings, including one in Raheen, County Limerick during which broadcaster George Hook spoke about the "politically correct" Irish media. A hotel in Tralee which received multiple critical phone calls for hosting an Irish Freedom Party meeting, gave a statement to the Irish Independent affirming their commitment to hosting the meeting, saying "If it was a racist group or something that was socially unacceptable then we wouldn't be hosting it."

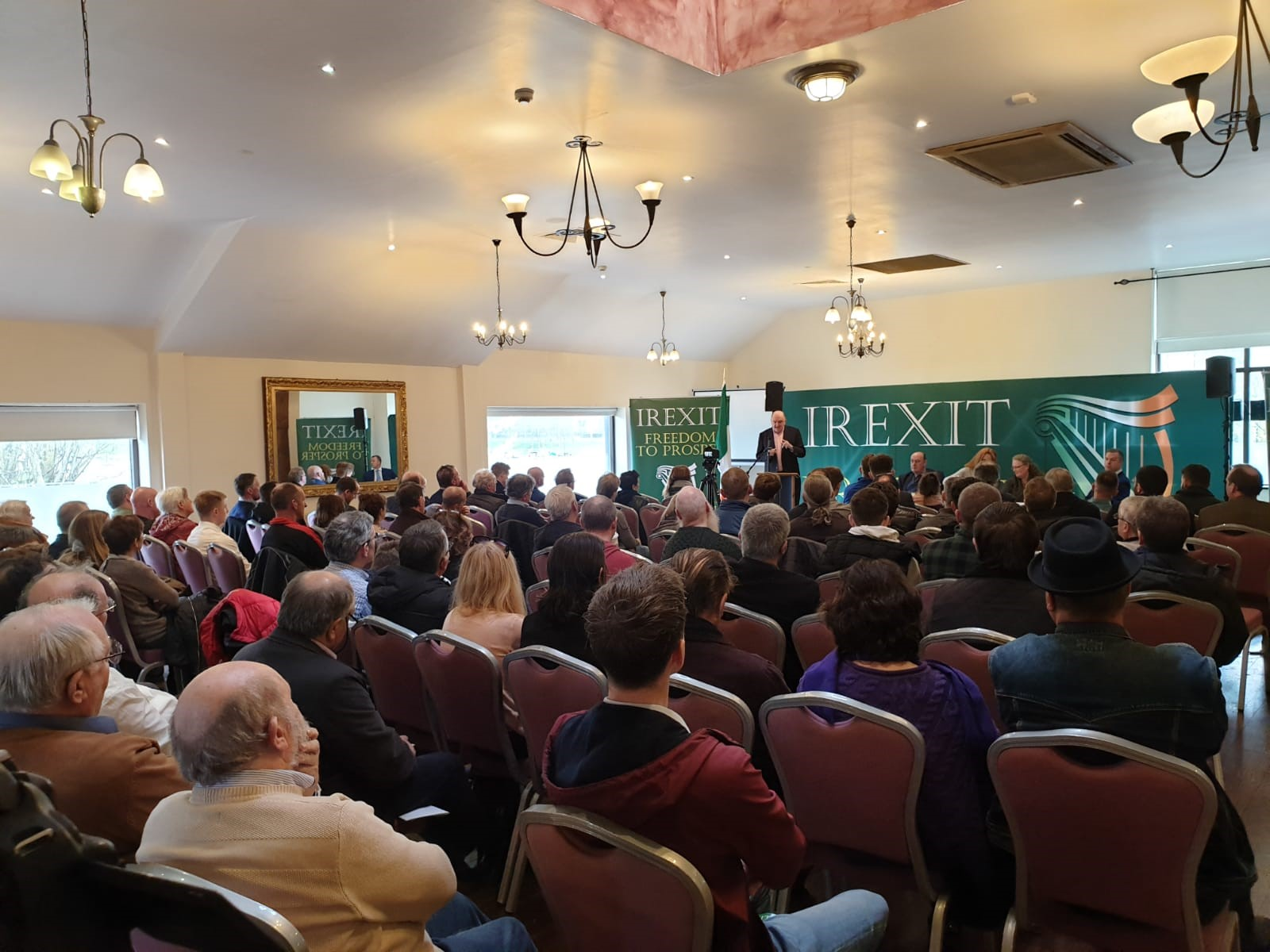
George Hook addresses an Irish Freedom Party meeting in 2019

In late March 2019, the organisation launched a nationwide billboard campaign ahead of the European elections, reportedly funded by members of the party. Sources from the Irish advertising industry estimated that this may have cost up to €40,000. The party did not answer questions from The Irish Times about whether the donations received are in line with Standards in Public Office (SIPO) Commission guidelines. Under those guidelines, a third party must register with the Commission if a donation exceeding €100 is accepted which is directed towards a political purpose. The party had not registered as a third party with SIPO.

=== Public demonstrations ===
The Irish Freedom Party has organised and participated in a number of public demonstrations since its formation. Supporters of the group were reported to have used 4chan to organise a rally in protest of Ireland's acceptance of the UN Migration Pact, outside Leinster House in December 2018. The rally was noted for drawing a counter-demonstration organised by People Before Profit, and attended by its party leader Richard Boyd Barrett. Gardaí estimated attendance at 250.

In October 2019, it was reported that leaders of the IFP, along with other groups were assisting in the organisation of protests in Oughterard Galway against the founding a direct provision centre. Up to 2,000 were estimated to have marched in the protest. A similar smaller protest in Monaghan Ireland was said to have been "endorsed by Irish Freedom Party Leaders".

In late 2019, the Irish Freedom Party, along with Renua and Yellow Vest Ireland organised two "free speech rallies", again outside Leinster House, in protest of proposed legislation by then Justice Minister Charles Flanagan to update laws regarding hate speech. The former taking place in November, included speakers such as Ben Gilroy, columnist Ian O'Doherty and Dolores Cahill. The latter of the two rallies in December saw a sizeable counter demonstration from a collection of trade unions, faith groups and anti-racism organisations. Several hundred were estimated to have attended both the rally and counterdemonstration, with three arrests being made following scuffles between the two sides.

In February 2020, members of Irish Freedom Party attended another "free speech" rally. This rally drew an estimated crowd size of 100 before being broken up by Gardaí due to violent clashes with counter-protestors, resulting in three more arrests. Party president Hermann Kelly claimed none of the members of the "free speech" protest were involved in violence.

In July 2020, IFP along with Renua and The National Party, organised and participated in a protest against the appointment of Roderic O'Gorman as Children's Minister for the new Government. Speakers for the rally included Irish actor John Connors and Justin Barrett. The groups involved called the protest after a photo surfaced of O'Gorman alongside gay rights activist Peter Tatchell, who has been forced to defend comments he made in 1997 in which he spoke about sex between adults and children. The rally was condemned by many as homophobic and for the inclusion of nooses on National Party banners and placards. John Connors later publicly apologised for his attendance to which O'Gorman accepted, clarifying that the photo in question was the only time he had met Tatchell, and that he was previously unaware of his controversial comments. Scuffles occurred with a small counterdemonstration, which was broken up by Gardai. No arrests were made.

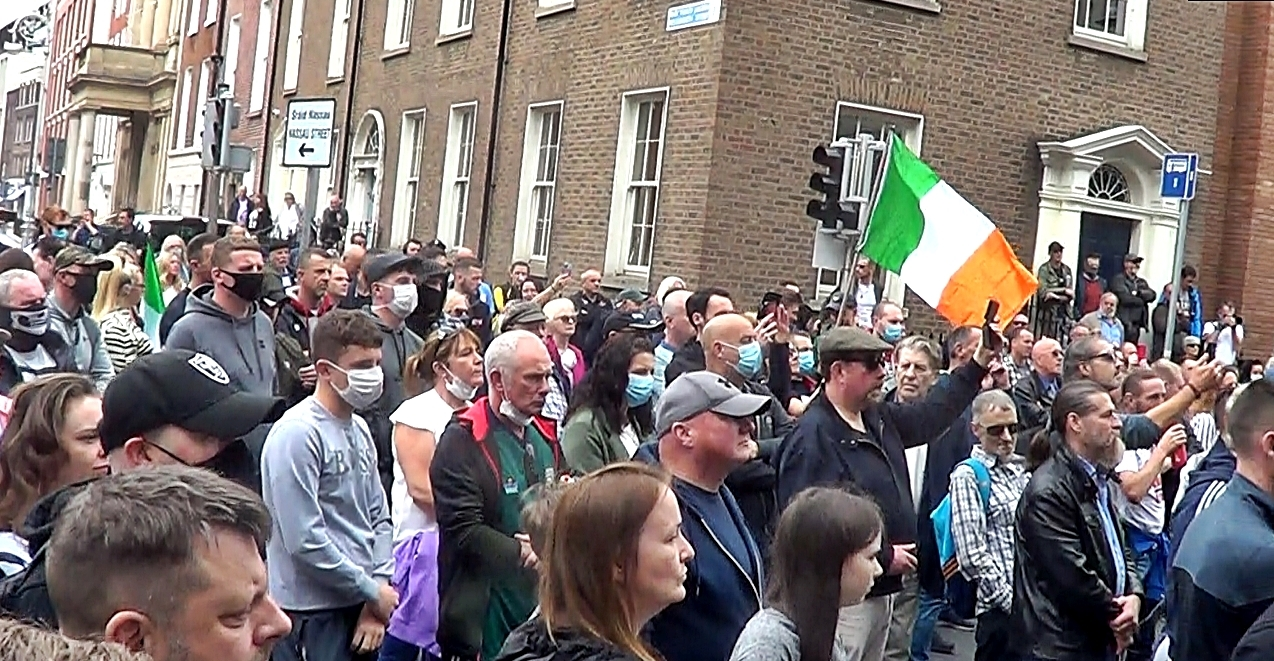
Rally in protest of Roderic O'Gorman in July 2020

Further protests rallies against Irish lockdown restrictions were organised and participated in from summer 2020 into 2021. Former chairperson Dolores Cahill and current chairperson Michael Leahy both spoke to a large crowd outside the Custom House, Dublin in August. They would return on two more occasions to the Custom House for a march through the Dublin city centre in September, and another anti-lockdown rally in November, the latter featuring Kevin Sharkey as a speaker.

In July 2021, Irish Freedom Party were among thousands who attended two protests against vaccine passports outside the Convention Centre Dublin, which was temporarily housing the Oireachtas. Candidate for the party in the 2020 General Election, Ben Gilroy was among the speakers.

A protest organised by the party in Limerick in December 2021 was reportedly dispersed after being challenged by up to 100 counter-protesters, reported to be mostly "young people with Pride flags". Gardaí dispersed the rally after scuffles broke out. The party returned to the same site in March 2022 to host another rally and were met by a counter-demonstration again, however no violence occurred.

A group launched in late 2023, Sinne na Daoine (Irish for "we the people") which has engaged in anti-immigration "patrols" across Ireland, has been associated with party members. Party leader Hermann Kelly has described Sinne na Daoine as a "vigilante group".

=== Elections ===
In March 2019, ahead of 2019 Irish local elections, several regional newspapers reported that a party-member named 'Mairead Donovan' was listed on the IFP website as a candidate to be a Kerry County Councillor. The Ireland edition of The Times later reported that the candidate did not exist, and that the website image was a stock photograph. Party spokesperson Hermann Kelly acknowledged the mistake and fault in allowing the placeholder profile and stock imagery to be published on the website, and clarified that the group was not planning to run any candidates in the 2019 local elections.

In advance of the 2019 European Parliament election, the party also reportedly "botched their [party registration] application" by failing to "tick its own box". Hermann Kelly admitted their application was rejected because of a mistake made by the party and that it would need to resubmit the form. As a result, it was not registered as a political party before the deadline for nominations in the 2019 European elections (15 April 2019), and so candidates it had planned to put forward under the Irish Freedom Party name had to list themselves as independents. Hermann Kelly ran in the Dublin constituency, while party chairperson Dolores Cahill ran in the South constituency. Neither candidate was elected, with party leader Herman Kelly receiving 2,441 (0.67%) first preference votes, and Cahill receiving 10,582 (1.47%) first preference votes. The party's registration was subsequently completed, and the Irish Freedom Party (IFP) was included on the Register of Political Parties as of 13 June 2019.

The Irish Freedom Party contested its first election as a registered political party in the 2019 Wexford by-election, running Melissa O'Neill, a former member of Sinn Féin who served on Kilkenny County Council from 2014 to 2019. She received 489 (1.2%) first preference votes and was eliminated on the first count.

Party member Conor Rafferty ran in Mid Ulster in the 2019 UK General Election, as an independent since the party is unregistered in Northern Ireland, receiving 690 votes (1.5%).

The party fielded 11 candidates in the 2020 Irish general election, with none being elected. Candidates received a share of first preference votes between 0.19% (119 votes) and 2.06% (956 votes) in their respective constituencies. Party chairperson Dolores Cahill came second-last in the Tipperary constituency with 0.6% of first preference votes (521 votes).

In March 2021, Cahill was asked to leave her position in the party and resigned as party chairperson. In July of that year she went on to stand unsuccessfully as a non-party candidate, in the 2021 Dublin Bay South by-election, receiving 0.6% of first preference votes (169 votes).

The party fielded 3 candidates in the 2024 European Parliament elections, with none being elected. Candidates received 29,709 (1.7%) first preference votes.

In the 2024 Irish local elections, the party got its first elected representative when Glen Moore was elected to South Dublin County Council (SDCC) for the Palmerstown-Fonthill area. However, in a Tweet dated to February 2025, Moore stated that he had resigned from the party citing disagreements with Herman Kelly's leadership and encouraging remaining members to join "other political parties that represent their values". As of 2026, he sits as an independent councillor on SDCC.

=== Position regarding vaccines and lockdown ===
During the COVID-19 pandemic in 2020, the Irish Freedom Party organised and had a number of representatives speak at multiple large anti-vaccination and anti-lockdown rallies. One rally, held outside the Dublin Custom House in August at which Ben Gilroy and Dolores Cahill spoke, was attended by "hundreds" and reported to have passed off mostly peacefully, despite some instances of violence between attendees and counter protestors, after which four were arrested.

Cahill, who was then a non-lecturing professor of translational medicine at University College Dublin, also spoke at an anti-vaccination and anti-lockdown event in London, which later lead to a warrant for her arrest in the UK. In a video, published in May 2020 but later removed by YouTube, she claimed that COVID-19 could be cured or curtailed by "eating healthily and taking vitamins C and D", that there was "no need for a vaccine" because people who recover have life-long immunity, and advocated using hydroxychloroquine and ivermectin as COVID-19 treatments. The party "agreed to accept [Cahill's] resignation" several days after it sent a letter to Cahill about her unsubstantiated statements, including those made at an anti-lockdown rally about "children who wore face masks [..] being starved of oxygen and would have lower IQ" and "globalists [..] pulling down the masks [because] oxygen-deprived people are easier to manipulate". Cahill's replacement, Michael Leahy, stated that Cahill "was making certain pronouncements that we felt we couldn't stand over and [..] it resulted in her resignation". A correspondence obtained by the Irish Independent later found that Cahill had been asked for her resignation.

In 2021, IFP joint-published a COVID-19 information leaflet (with Direct Democracy Ireland and Renua) advocating against the use of lockdowns as a means of controlling a virus which the leaflet stated was "harmless to the vast majority". A fact check from TheJournal.ie stated that these claims were "misleading and false".

=== 2025 leadership split ===
The party split in 2025 over the issue of Hermann Kelly's leadership. In May 2025, a number of party members passed a motion to remove Kelly as president and create a three-person committee to lead unity talks with other right-wing parties. As part of these negotiations with the other political parties, British political activist Jim Ferguson chaired a meeting which included Michael Leahy (IFP), Malachy Steenson (independent) and Derek Blighe (Ireland First).

In September 2025, Hermann Kelly called an Ardfheis of the party and the IFP website was subsequently updated to state that Kelly had been re-elected as party president at the meeting. However, Michael Leahy later stated that the meeting was invalid and held without the approval of the "interim committee". Leahy moved to oust Kelly as a party member in October 2025, and later stated that Kelly had "been expelled". An article in The Phoenix magazine, from October 2025, suggested that the matter remained contested between the Kelly and Leahy factions.

=== 2026 register cancellation ===
In June 2026, the Electoral Commission stated that the party was to be removed from the Register of Political Parties. The Electoral Commission stated that "two separate applications" had been received "seeking to update the details of the Irish Freedom Party in the Register of Political Parties". A spokesperson for the Electoral Commission said that the "information provided in each application was insufficient and, when considered together, the applications contained conflicting claims... Despite repeated requests for clarification and further information, the Registrar was not satisfied that either application demonstrated compliance with the requirements that all registered political parties must meet under Section 47 of the Electoral Reform Act 2022". The outcome of the registrar's decision is subject to a 21-day appeal period.

== Controversies ==
=== Cahill statements ===
Prior to her resignation from IFP in March 2021, party chairperson Dolores Cahill stoked anger for hosting a party, amid Covid-19 lockdown restrictions, of up to 60 guests at her castle in Athy Kildare. Cahill also promoted COVID-19 related conspiracy theories, stating that "globalists" pushed for mandatory mask wearing because "oxygen-deprived people are easier to manipulate".

=== Confrontation at rallies in Limerick ===
In December 2021, the party organised a rally in Bedford Row, Limerick city which attracted approximately 100 counter-protestors. It was alleged that an IFP supporter tried to tear an LGBT flag from the hands of a counter-protestor and shouted homophobic slurs and made death threats. The IFP held another rally in Limerick in March 2022, which was "drowned out" by approximately 100 counter-protestors, many of whom carried LGBT flags. Following the disruptions, IFP chairman Michael Leahy rejected claims the IFP are homophobic and said the LGBT rainbow flag was "beautiful" and "symbolises acceptance of diversity and unity in difference". He accused the anti-fascist counter-protestors of themselves engaging in "fascist tactics".

=== Links to far-right terrorist conspiracy in Germany ===
The party has links to far-right German judge Birgit Malsack-Winkemann, who was arrested in December 2022 as part of a series of arrests by the German government as part of a crackdown against a conspiracy to launch a coup d'état and install an imperial dictatorship in Germany. The movement behind the plot has been described as "a loose alliance of neo-Nazis and conspiracy theorists who deny the legitimacy of the modern German state". Malsack-Winkemann spoke at an Irish Freedom Party event in August 2020, after which Hermann Kelly entertained her and her daughter by showing them the Celtic high crosses at Monasterboice. They were also photographed outside a pub. In May 2021, Kelly took part in a two-hour discussion with Ms Malsack-Winkemann and another AfD Bundestag member, Norbert Kleinwächter. They discussed opposition to Covid lockdown measures and arguments in favour of leaving the European Union.

=== Candidate guilty of public order offences ===
A candidate from the IFP, Paul Fitzsimons, who was contesting the 2024 Fingal County Council elections in Ongar, was charged with public order offences and possession of a knife at a protest in Dublin in February 2024. As he was "running in the local election", Fitzsimons reportedly requested that the related court hearing be set to a date after the June 2024 elections. In April 2025, Fitzsimons was found guilty of two public order offences arising from the incident. Judge Patricia Cronin dismissed the charges relating to the knife, after noting the reason he had it was to cut down posters.

== Ideology ==
Aside from advocating an exit from the EU, the party stated that it was a "patriotic party" and was "pro-natalist and supportive of stable families for procreation". The party published policies in favour of preserving freedom of speech and association. On economic policy, the IFP supported reduced government spending and lower taxes,

It advocated independence from "either London or Brussels", desiring to leave the EU and to re-unify Ireland by consent. It advocated "zero tolerance" of corruption and the "separation of powers" in the state.

=== Climate policy ===
Party chairman, Michael Leahy has stated that he is "sceptical of climate change," calling it "hyper alarmism." He however claimed he favours "alternative energy sources because we are running out of fossil fuels". The party is opposed to the carbon tax.

=== Great Replacement conspiracy theory ===
Some commentators have linked party leader Hermann Kelly with alt-right ideologies, pointing to a YouTube interview in which Kelly appeared in 2018 alongside far-right activist and former British National Party member Jim Dowson. In the video Kelly said "The first thing they want to do is kill Irish kids and [they] want to replace them with every nationality who wants to come into our country", a statement which several news outlets associated with the great replacement conspiracy theory.

In 2019, Kelly stated that "those talking about a Great Replacement in Ireland have a point", and in an interview with LifeSiteNews, referred to what he called the "great replacement of our children". Kelly later stated that he believes in "one human race" and has not supported "theories of racial superiority".

=== Vaccines ===
Hermann Kelly has been described as "waging a war" against mandatory vaccinations and vaccination certificates. As of 2021, he was serving as press officer to Romanian MEP Cristian Terheș of the European Conservatives and Reformists group, who consistently declined to show proof of vaccination upon entering the European Parliament.

=== LGBT rights ===
The party were one of a number of groups accused in 2022 of promoting an anti-LGBT, homophobic and conspiracy agenda, including by the Global Project against Hate and Extremism. IFP chairman Michael Leahy rejected this claim and stated that the group has "no policy whatever in regard to discrimination against homosexuals".

== Election results ==
=== Dáil Éireann ===
Election	Leader	1st pref votes	%	Seats	±	Government
2020	Hermann Kelly	5,495	0.3 (#10)	0 / 160	New	Extra-parliamentary
2024	Hermann Kelly	14,838	0.6 (#10)	0 / 174	Steady	Extra-parliamentary

=== European Parliament ===
Election	Leader	1st pref Votes	%	Seats	+/−	EP Group
2024	Hermann Kelly	29,709	1.70 (#13)	0 / 14	New	−

=== Local elections ===
Election	Seats won	±	First pref. votes	%
2024	1 / 949	▲1	9,500	0.5%
