= Euroscepticism in the Republic of Ireland =

Criticism/Opposition to the European Union in Ireland

Euroscepticism is a minority view in Ireland. Opinion polls held in the country between 2017 and 2024 indicated between 70% and 90% support for continued membership of the European Union (EU), and a 2021 'Eurobarometer' report indicated that 75% of poll respondents had a "positive image of the EU".

Irish Eurosceptics say that the EU undermines Irish sovereignty, that it lacks democratic legitimacy, it is neoliberal and works for the benefit of the business elite and it is a threat to Irish neutrality.

Some Irish Eurosceptics oppose elements of the EU and its policies and seek reform, while others seek an Irish withdrawal from the EU altogether. This proposed withdrawal is sometimes referred to as "Irexit", based on "Brexit", the common term for the British withdrawal from the EU.

Euroscepticism in Ireland is traditionally found in more left-wing and Irish republican groups. The biggest of these have been Sinn Féin and People Before Profit–Solidarity, who each have members in elected office. Sinn Féin long opposed European integration, but now describes itself as "critical, but supportive, of the EU" and does not advocate withdrawal from the Union. The Green Party have also shifted from being Eurosceptic to pro-EU. More recently, small right-wing Eurosceptic parties have formed in Ireland, but they lack representation in any elected positions.

== Background and opinion ==
Ireland pursued an isolationist policy from the 1920s to the 1950s. In the mid-1950s, Éamon de Valera, then opposition leader and former Taoiseach, noted that Ireland would have less representation and influence in a European Parliament than it had in the British parliament before independence, saying Ireland "did not strive to get out of that British domination [...] to get into a worse [position]".

Membership of the EEC was however sought by successive Irish governments, and Ireland acceded to the European Economic Community (EEC) in 1973. This followed a referendum with a near record turnout of 71% (the highest turnout since the vote to adopt the Constitution itself in 1937) and saw a five-to-one vote (83.1%) in favour of joining. Then President Éamon de Valera opposed the state's entry.

A Red C poll, commissioned by European Movement Ireland (EM Ireland) in January 2013, found most Irish people would opt for Ireland to remain inside the EU (66%) even if the UK decided to leave. Just 29% of those asked said that Ireland should leave if the UK did.

In a 2015 opinion poll, commissioned by EM Ireland, 84% said they "believe that Ireland has, on balance, benefited from membership" and 77% said Ireland should remain in the EU even if the UK left, while only 33% agreed that there should be an EU army.

Following the Brexit referendum, a poll commissioned by public relations firm PR360 found that 77% of those polled believed EU membership was a good thing. It also found that, if a referendum on EU membership were held in Ireland, 80% would vote remain, 13% vote leave, with 7% undecided.

Another poll conducted by Ipsos after the Brexit referendum found that 81% thought the UK had made the wrong decision to leave, 12% thought the UK was right to leave and 7% said they didn't know.

A poll conducted by Red C in January 2017 found that 70% were in favour of EU membership while 28% said they would vote for an 'Irexit' if there was a "hard border" with Northern Ireland. Additional Eurobarometer and Red C polls in the first half of 2017 found that a significant majority agreed that Ireland should remain in the European Union, with the former poll suggesting 90% support for freedom of movement of EU nationals, and 85% support for economic and monetary union.

In February 2018, a poll by Amárach Research of 1000 voters indicated 79% support for EU membership and only 10% support for an "Irexit".

A poll by EM Ireland in May 2018 indicated over 90% support for continued EU membership.

Poll results published by Sky News in February 2019 indicated that, in the event of a no-deal Brexit, 81% of the Irish people polled "would cut economic ties with the UK rather than with the EU".

A Eurobarometer poll conducted across the EU in March 2019 showed that if a referendum on EU membership were held tomorrow, 83% of people in Ireland would vote to remain. This was the second highest result in the EU, with only the Netherlands ranking higher. Another Eurobarometer poll, in early 2021, also indicated continued "high levels of public support" for the EU, with a 2022 poll indicating that only 7% of those asked believed that Ireland should leave the EU.

In 2023, EM Ireland undertook a poll in both jurisdictions on the island of Ireland, which reportedly indicated that 88% of respondents in the Republic of Ireland and 79% of respondents in Northern Ireland supported EU membership. Of those who had voted for Brexit in Northern Ireland, 71% supported the Republic of Ireland remaining a member of the EU and 64% believed that Northern Ireland was "doing worse" post-Brexit.

A 2025 poll undertaken by Amárach Research on behalf of European Movement Ireland indicated that 82% of people in the Republic of Ireland supported continued EU membership, while 77% of people in Northern Ireland supported membership.

== Developments ==
The 2000s saw the birth of a number of small organisations with eurosceptic positions, including Éirígí, Saoradh, Identity Ireland, Libertas Ireland, Cóir and the National Party. Some of these (like Identity Ireland, 115 members) report a very small base of members, while others (like Cóir) were limited-lifespan lobby groups involved in the Lisbon Treaty campaign and whose campaign included references to Ireland's independence struggle. A conference in the RDS, Dublin in February 2018 was claimed by organisers to have been attended by "600 Irexit supporters and young people".

The 2014 European Parliament election saw some support for candidates with eurosceptic connections, with 4 of the available 11 seats going to members of the "soft eurosceptic" GUE-NGL grouping and 1 seat to a Fianna Fáil candidate Brian Crowley, who later joined the European Conservatives and Reformists group. However, the latter did not attend any votes in the European Parliament.

This followed a number of events, including changes in the post-2008 Irish economic outlook, and the Lisbon Treaty vote, which some commentators linked with a 'scepticism' of some aspects of the union.

=== Lisbon and Nice referendums ===
In Ireland, ratification of significant amendments to the Treaties of the European Union requires an amendment to the Constitution, and hence a referendum vote. In the 2000s, there were referendums on the ratification of the Treaty of Nice and the Treaty of Lisbon. In each case, a first referendum failed to pass but, following renegotiation and the debunking of certain claims made during campaigning, a second one was successful (with around two-thirds majority in favour in both cases).

The calling of second referendums drew criticism from some quarters. People Before Profit for example, had opposed the Lisbon treaty saying "Enshrined in this Treaty are the failed neo-liberal policies which have caused the recent economic crisis. This is a Treaty for big business".

=== Troika and the euro ===
Following the post-2008 Irish economic downturn, some commentators noted that the response by the European troika to economic developments might lead to some changes in the "political landscape" and changes in perception of institutions like the European Commission and European Central Bank. Other economic commentators, like David McWilliams, argued that membership of the eurozone was bad for the Irish economy. As of 2015 however, perceptions of EU membership as a whole remained favourable.

Direct Democracy Ireland have questioned whether withdrawal from the eurozone would lead to improved economic growth in Ireland.

=== Brexit ===
Anticipation of the potentially negative effect of Brexit on the Irish economy led to some speculation about a possible 'Irexit' both before and after the British referendum. Cliff Taylor of The Irish Times said that the question arose because Ireland's participation in the single market is "vital" to the economy, and that Ireland's interactions with the British economy were similarly "vital", leaving the economy of Ireland in a potentially awkward position.

In November 2016, Harry McGee of The Irish Times reported that "a small but growing band of public figures [were] questioning the basis of Irish EU membership", identifying the Socialist Workers Party and Socialist Party as groups that would support an exit. After the Brexit vote however, polls indicated that 80% of those asked would not support a similar Irish exit. Following Brexit, some British politicians who had supported it, claimed Ireland would also leave the EU, with Kate Hoey claiming (without evidence) that Ireland "'will probably decide to leave' in the short term".

In September 2018, the Irish Freedom Party (also known as "Irexit Freedom to Prosper"), was formed to campaign for an Irish exit from the EU and to field candidates in the 2019 European Parliament election. Its two candidates, neither elected, were party leader Hermann Kelly, who received 2,441 first preference votes (0.67%) in the Dublin constituency, and chairperson Professor Dolores Cahill, who received 1.47% of first preference votes in the South constituency.

== See also ==
- Libertas.eu
- National Platform
- People's Movement (Ireland)
