= James Reynolds (Irish politician) =

Irish politician (born 1968)

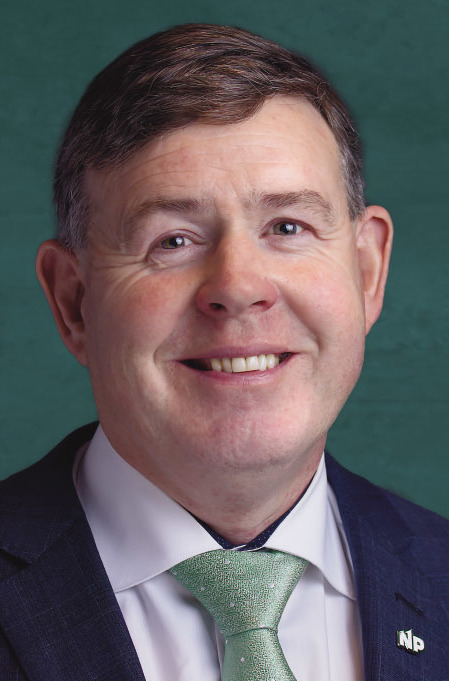
- Reynolds in 2020

Leader of the National Party
- In office July 2023 – September 2025
- Deputy: Patrick Quinlan (until 2025)
- Preceded by: Justin Barrett
- Succeeded by: Patrick Quinlan

Deputy leader of the National Party
- In office 16 November 2016 – July 2023
- Leader: Justin Barrett

Personal details
- Born: 7 December 1968 (age 57) Edgeworthstown, County Longford, Ireland
- Party: Independent
- Other political affiliations: National Party (2016–2025) Libertas Ireland (2009); Fine Gael (1988–1991)
- Education: NUI Galway (BSc); Multyfarnham Agricultural College; St Mel's College

James Joseph Reynolds (born 7 December 1968) is an Irish farmer, and far-right politician who served as vice president of the National Party from 2016 to 2023. He served as leader of the party from 2023 until 2024 (although this position was contested by party co-founder Justin Barrett).

From Edgeworthstown, County Longford, he has an undergraduate degree from National University of Ireland Galway. Reynolds was active in farming politics, serving as chairman of the Longford branch of the Irish Farmers' Association (IFA) from 1999 to 2003 and subsequently as treasurer of the Irish Cattle and Sheep Farmers' Association (ICSA) until 2017.

He co-founded the National Party (NP) with Justin Barrett in November 2016. He was an unsuccessful candidate for the party at the 2020 Irish general election, standing in the Longford–Westmeath constituency. According to a statement issued on the party's website, Barrett had been ousted from the leadership and Reynolds was elected president of the party in mid-July 2023. This was contested by Barrett and a two-year dispute by rival factions of the NP ensued. The matter was finally resolved by the Electoral Commission in 2025, resulting in the removal of Barrett. Reynolds was an unsuccessful candidate for the Midlands–North-West constituency at the European Parliament elections on 7 June 2024. Following this, he publicly withdrew from the National Party.

== Farming activism ==
=== Irish Farmers' Association ===
Reynolds was elected chairman of Longford IFA branch in 1999, a position which he held until 2003. He then chaired his local Ballinalee IFA branch. He was a staunch critic of IFA president Pádraig Walshe. At the 2006 Ploughing Championships in Tullow, Reynolds organised up to twenty posters depicting Walshe with the Minister for Agriculture, Fisheries and Food, Mary Coughlan, in his arms with the words "Beet this" printed above them to be placed at various routes to the ploughing site. This referred to Walshe's alleged role in the demise of the Irish sugar industry.

In 2009 Reynolds and other disgruntled IFA farmers formed Farmers For No to oppose the second Lisbon Treaty referendum. They claimed the Treaty of Lisbon would fast-track Turkey's application to join the EU, which would "double the number of farmers overnight" and cause Common Agricultural Policy payments to collapse. They further claimed that the passage of the Treaty would "jeopardise" farm succession rights. The second Lisbon Treaty referendum subsequently passed by a margin of 67% to 33%.

Farmers For No was revived in 2012 to oppose the European Fiscal Compact in that year's referendum. Reynolds caused a stir on an episode of RTÉ's The Frontline debating the Treaty, in which he provoked the host Pat Kenny by suggesting that a Yes vote would "shut down rural Ireland" to which Kenny responded, "come on James, get a life." The incident prompted Reynolds to be labelled "a YouTube sensation" by The Irish Times.

He was suspended by the IFA in 2012 for bringing the county executive "into disrepute".

=== Irish Cattle and Sheep Farmers' Association ===
In 2014, he was elected for a two-year term as national treasurer of the ICSA, having previously served as its secretary. During his time as ICSA treasurer he said the organisation was "unique in being the only farm organisation to call for the appointment of an EU-wide regulator for the meat industry".

In response to Reynolds' role in co-founding the National Party he was removed from his position as national treasurer of the ICSA by a vote of no confidence passed by the organisation's executive. Reynolds rejected the legitimacy of the executive's decision to expel him and said he believes he should not be discriminated against for his political views. He launched an appeal against the decision to remove him as national treasurer. Justice Robert Haughton granted Reynolds a temporary injunction preventing the ICSA from removing him from his position. Ultimately, the High Court ruled in favour of the ICSA against Reynolds and his expulsion was confirmed. The ICSA also objected to Reynolds' "gratuitously offensive comments made about the former Taoiseach Enda Kenny, the EU Commissioner and other politicians".

== Political activism ==
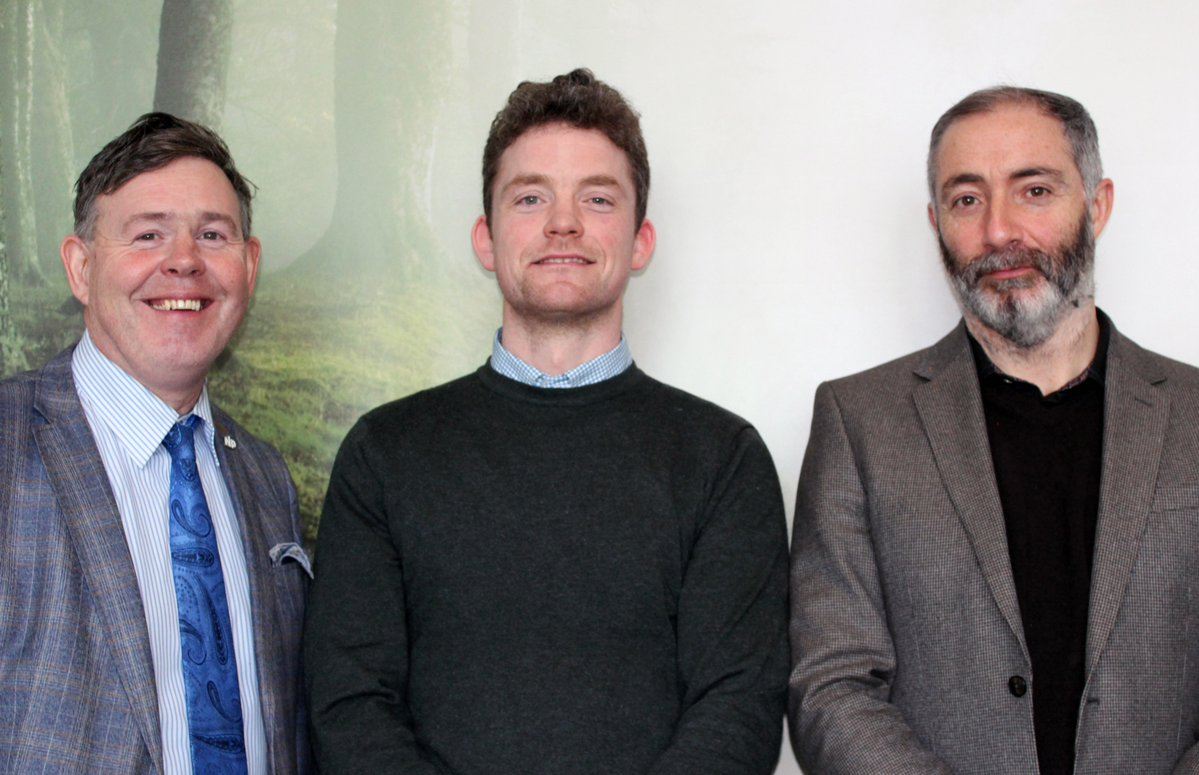
Reynolds (left) with fellow National Party general election candidates Paul McWeeney and Paul Hanley in January 2020.

During the 1990s Reynolds was a prominent member of the hardline anti-abortion group Youth Defence. In a 1992 interview with Hot Press, Reynolds spoke of abandoning democracy and argued for the introduction of internment and the reintroduction of the death penalty to Ireland. The same article featured a conversation between Reynolds and another member of Youth Defence in which Reynolds "recalled Mussolini with fondness" but chided Francisco Franco for "allowing ‘commies and socialists’ into his government towards the end”. During the same time period, Reynolds stated in an interview with Shannonside radio that if Nuala Fennell and Nora Owen of Fine Gael been active politically in Spain in the 1970s like they were in Ireland in the 1990s, "they would have been put up against a wall and shot".

In a 2023 interview, he said he had been interested in politics "since a young age" and "was very taken with the Gaelic system of 'Tanistry' because of my lifelong belief in freedom, limited government and being totally opposed to tyranny. I was also an admirer of the Ancient Roman Republic and as a young man, I was always uncompromising in my opposition to Communism, Socialism and Liberalism".

Reynolds contested the 2004 Longford County Council election as an independent candidate, leaving his post of Longford IFA chairman to do so. He received 231 first preference votes and failed to be elected, being eliminated on the fourth count. The same year Justin Barrett campaigned unsuccessfully for a seat in the European Parliament.

In 2009, Reynolds became chairman of the Longford branch of Libertas Ireland, a political party founded by Declan Ganley. Reynolds campaigned on behalf of Ganley's unsuccessful attempt to be elected an MEP. In November 2009, Libertas Ireland was removed from the Register of Political Parties in Ireland.

Reynolds' next foray into politics was as chair of the Eurosceptic Farmers For No campaign, established to oppose the 2009 Lisbon Treaty referendum. The group was briefly revived to oppose the 2012 Compact Fiscal referendum, Reynolds claimed the treaty would put the Common Agricultural Policy budget "at severe risk".

In November 2016 he helped to co-found the National Party and assumed the post of vice president of the new party. Reynolds has spoken at a number of National Party events since the party's launch, including alongside Barrett who has described Reynolds as a "friend for many years". At the party's first ardfheis, guest speaker John Wilson walked out in reaction to homophobic comments, including a claim by Reynolds that LGBT people were "mentally disordered".

In June 2019, Reynolds accompanied anti-immigration and conspiracy-theorist campaigner Gemma O'Doherty for a livestream in Longford, during which a Polish woman living in the town confronted the pair outside St. Mel's Cathedral. Reynolds subsequently spoke in O'Doherty's favour during protests held outside Google's Dublin headquarters following her suspension from YouTube. Local independent County Councillor Turlough McGovern denied political association with Reynolds after the county council elections in 2019, when Reynolds was photographed celebrating with him. McGovern has since denied support of or by Reynolds and that any involvement from Reynolds was "in a personal capacity".

Reynolds was an unsuccessful candidate in Longford-Westmeath in the 2020 general election, garnering a total of 983 first preference votes (1.74%). He was eliminated on the sixth count. Speaking after the result, Reynolds said: "I accept my result with good grace and a healthy optimism with an eye towards the future. I believe the groundwork has been laid for future successes... I look forward to continuing my work in Longford and demonstrating my commitment to the people."

Reynolds was reportedly involved in moving €400,000 worth of gold bars from the National Party's offices in July 2023. A statement issued by the National Party on 31 July stated that Barrett had been dismissed as party leader in mid-July, and replaced by Reynolds, prior to the gold's removal. This was disputed by Barrett. A period of approximately two years followed where both Barrett and Reynolds contested the leadership and made submissions to the Electoral Commission. In September 2025, the Electoral Commission removed both Barrett and Reynolds from the party's officer board following a submission made by the party on foot of its AGM in October 2024.

At the 2024 European Parliament election, Reynolds stood in the Midlands–North-West constituency, where he was eliminated on the fourth count with 3,201 first-preference votes (0.47%). During the election count, Reynolds said that he would never run again for the National Party, describing their brand as "toxic". He subsequently left the party around October 2024.
