= Brigid Anne Ryan =

Irish journalist

Brigid (or Bridget) Anne Ryan (1966 or 1967) is a former Irish journalist. In 1992 she became the first female editor of The Irish Catholic newspaper. She resigned as editor in 1995, and later became involved with the Pilgrim House Community religious group. The religious group, which operated a care home for people with intellectual disabilities of which Ryan was a director, was closed in 2015 following inspections by the Health Information and Quality Authority (HIQA).

== Journalistic career ==
Originally from Borrisoleigh in County Tipperary, Ryan started writing for The Irish Catholic in 1989. Prior to this she had studied journalism at the College of Commerce, Rathmines and had worked in commercial journalism. In 1984, she won the Irish Goods Council's "Young Journalist of the Year" award and was an assistant editor for the trade magazine Today's Grocer. Upon her appointment as the first female editor of the Irish Catholic, Ryan told the Sunday Tribune that "it is a signal of how women are taking a stronger stance in all social matters, including religion".

In 1994, while writing about her television appearance on The Late Late Show in which she debated the dissident priest Pat Buckley, Nell McCafferty of the Sunday Tribune remarked that Ryan could "shoot a look that would scald at 40 paces". In an interview with the Irish Independent in 1995, journalist Joan Brady noted that Ryan "had become a familiar face and voice as radio and television programmes regularly debate issues which concern the Church and our predominantly Catholic population". In that interview, Ryan expressed views on divorce and contraception which were not in agreement with the hierarchy of the Catholic Church at the time.

Ryan resigned from The Irish Catholic in 1995 after criticism from the bishop of Cashel and Ossory and the archbishop of Dublin about an editorial she wrote on Pope John Paul II and his stance on capital punishment. She stated that she was only permitted to write editorials that were approved by the paper's management; earlier that year she wrote an editorial questioning the freedom of the religious media in Ireland on foot of the dismissal of Father Kevin Hegarty as editor of Intercom. She was succeeded as editor by David Quinn, and remains the only woman to have been editor to The Irish Catholic.

== Later activities ==
Following her resignation from The Irish Catholic, Ryan became involved with the Pilgrim House Community religious group, acting as a director. The group, which was described as "controversial" and "cult-like", operated a care home which was the subject of investigations by the Health Information and Quality Authority (HIQA). Ryan was one of the signatures of a public apology to the group's founder Helena O'Leary that was placed as an advert in the Irish Times in June 2008. The advert, in which the signatories apologised to O'Leary for their "dishonesty", was the subject of some media interest and was described by the Irish Times as "mysterious and dramatic".

With her husband, Benedict Hogan, Ryan also ran the organisation Protect Children Against Incest (also known as Protect Children From Incest) with the asserted goal of exposing "incest and the families and individuals who try to cover it up". Among their actions have been handing out leaflets (which made accusations of incest against members of a "well-known local family") and storming the altar during mass at Kill O'The Grange church in Dun Laoghaire in 2004 (accusing the priest of not preventing "adverse publicity about their group").

The Pilgrim House Community, of which Ryan was a director and which had received over €1m from the Health Service Executive from 2010 to 2015, reportedly closed in early 2015 following inspections by HIQA.
