= Kathy O'Beirne =

Kathleen Elizabeth "Kathy" O'Beirne (18 October 1956 – 24 February 2019) was an Irish author, best known for a controversial memoir known as Kathy's Story in Ireland and as Don't Ever Tell elsewhere, the most successful non-fiction book published by an Irish author.

The daughter of Oliver and Ann O'Beirne, she was born in Dublin. However, in her book, O'Beirne claims that she was adopted. According to journalist Hermann Kelly, O'Beirne was educated at Scoil Mhuire in Clondalkin from 1961 to 1969; in 1967, at the age of 11, she spent six weeks at St Anne's Reformatory School in Kilmacud.

Kathy's Story was co-written with Michael Sheridan, a journalist, and published in 2005. In the book, she describes an abusive home life and subsequently being placed in a children's home where she was raped by a priest; she was then sent to a psychiatric facility and finally placed in a Magdalene laundry at High Park Convent in Drumcondra, where she was again raped, giving birth to a daughter who later died at the age of 10. She describes how, after she escaped from the Magdalene laundry, she was placed in Mountjoy Prison.

All but one of her siblings dispute her version of events, particularly where their father is concerned, and deny that she ever was placed in a Magdalene laundry; also, the Order of Our Lady of Charity, which operated the Magdalene laundry in question, claims that O'Beirne was never a resident in one of their homes. According to Hermann Kelly, her description of life in a Magdalene laundry is inconsistent with accounts given by former inmates of those facilities. Her publisher, Mainstream Publications, supports O'Beirne's claims, stating that it has evidence that supports her claims.

== See also ==
- Misery literature
- Margaret Seltzer
