= Michael Kelly (Irish journalist) =

Irish editor & journalist (born 1979)

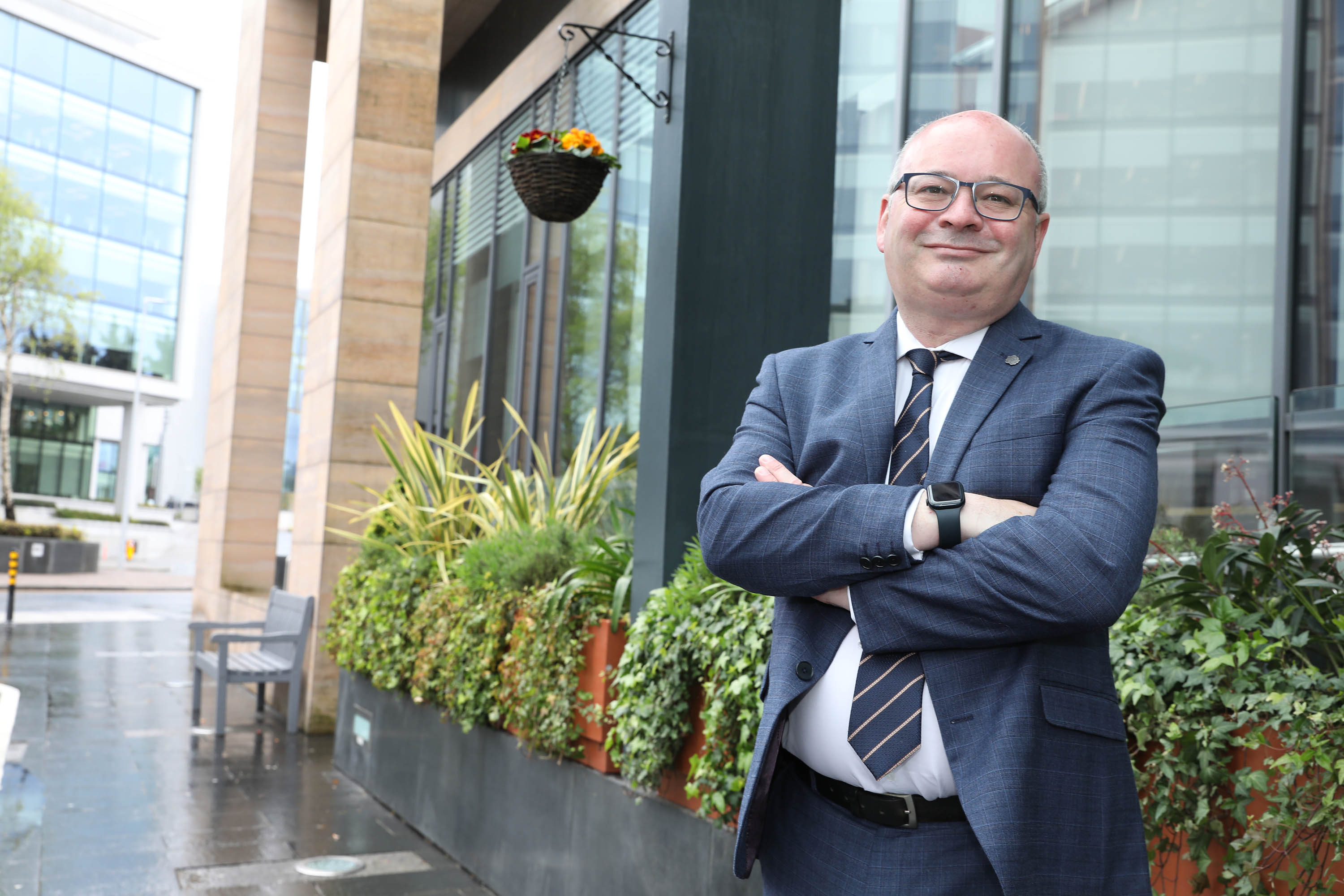
- Born: 1979 (age 46–47)
- Occupations: Journalist; editor

Michael Kelly (born 1979) is an Irish former newspaper editor. Before taking up appointment as Director of Public Affairs for the Pontifical Foundation Aid to the Church in Need, he was editor of the weekly newspaper The Irish Catholic and a columnist with the Irish Independent. and a regular contributor to RTÉ and the BBC

== Biography ==
Kelly is from Omagh, County Tyrone, and attended St Patrick's High school, Omagh and later St Patrick's College, Maynooth, where he studied for a post-graduate degree in theology. He worked as a producer and redactor for Vatican Radio in Rome, and served as Rome correspondent for The Irish Catholic. He returned to Ireland in 2005. He was appointed deputy editor of The Irish Catholic in 2007.

In October 2012, aged 33, he was appointed editor of The Irish Catholic, succeeding Garry O'Sullivan. He regularly appears as a guest contributor on TV and radio on religious topics. He has appeared on the BBC, UTV, CNN and Al Jazeera. He has made contributions to the American publications National Catholic Reporter, Our Sunday Visitor and The Catholic World Report the UK's Catholic Herald as well as Irish newspapers including the Irish Independent, Irish Examiner and The Irish News.

Kelly is a regular visitor and tour guide to the Holy Land., and is author of the book A Pilgrim Guide to the Holy Land He was leading a group of Irish pilgrims on October 7, 2023 when the Hamas attacks happened in southern Israel. The pilgrims later travelled home on a commercial flight, and Kelly was airlifted by the Royal Netherlands Air Force.

In May 2024, it was announced that Kelly had been appointed Director of Public Affairs for the Pontifical Foundation, Aid to the Church in Need, Ireland. In this role, he has led a campaign on behalf of Christians who are persecuted because of their beliefs, spoken up in support of the small Christian community in Gaza, and expressed fears about the plight of the Christians in Syria.

Kelly divides his time between his native Tyrone, Dublin, Rome and Jerusalem. He was present in Omagh during the 1998 bomb attack by the Real IRA, and has written and spoken of the carnage he experienced in the immediate aftermath of the attack which killed 31 people.

He is a regular voice on RTÉ providing commentary for major religious and Vatican events. He also regularly presents Prayer for the Day on BBC Radio Four.

Kelly has covered papal conclave in 2005, 2013. In 2025 he played a prominent role in television and radio coverage in Ireland and the United Kingdom around the conclave that elected Pope Leo XIV. in May 2025, it was announced that Kelly was writing a new book on Pope Leo XIV - expected to be one of the first books to be published on the new Pope.

Kelly is known for his anti-abortion views, and has advocated for support for the right to life of unborn children as well as their mothers. He has also advocated against assisted suicide, warning that it is a slippery slope.

== Publications ==
- How to Defend the Faith Without Raising Your Voice by Michael Kelly and Austen Ivereigh, Columba Press (2018).
- A Pilgrim Guide to the Holy Land by Michael Kelly, Columba Books (2022).
- In Christ we Are One: Pope Leo XIV at the Service of Humanity by Michael Kelly, ACN Church Resources DAC (2025).
