= Hermann Kelly =

Irish journalist (born 1968)

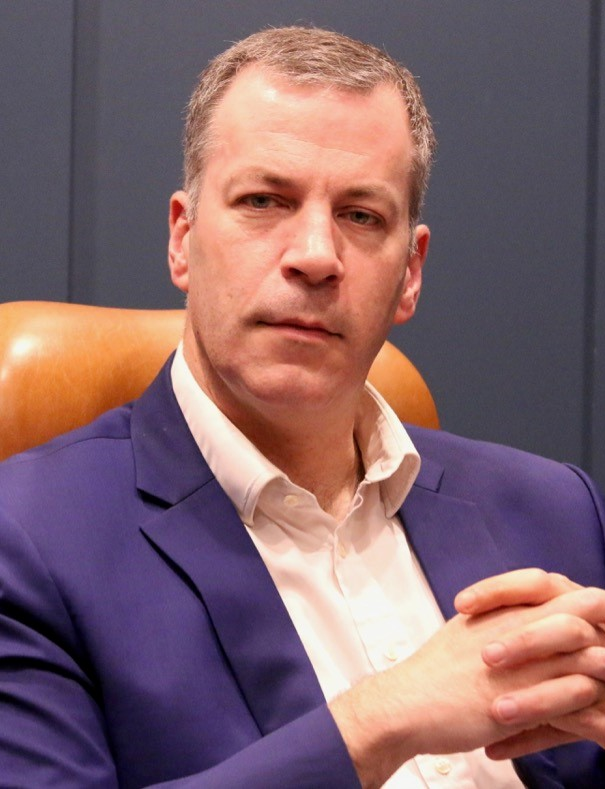
- Kelly in 2019

President of the Irish Freedom Party
- In office 8 September 2018 – 9 May 2025

Director of Communications for Europe of Freedom and Direct Democracy
- In office August 2009 – 2019

Personal details
- Born: 25 December 1968 (age 57) Dublin, Ireland
- Other political affiliations: Irish Freedom Party (since 2018) UK Independence Party (UKIP); EFDD Group in European Parliament
- Education: St Columb's College
- Alma mater: St Patrick's College, Maynooth
- Occupation: Press officer

Hermann Patrick Kelly (born 25 December 1968) is an Irish anti-immigration activist, politician, press officer and former journalist. He served as president of the far-right Irish Freedom Party (IFP) from its foundation in September 2018. As of October 2025, Kelly's leadership of the IFP was reportedly in dispute. Kelly has worked as an assistant to the Romanian MEP Cristian Terheș and Danish MEP Anders Vistisen.

== Early life and education ==
Kelly was born on 25 December 1968 in Dublin. He is originally from the Bogside in Derry. His father was a headmaster of a primary school in Creggan, his mother was a nurse who emigrated from Australia and he has three siblings.

His secondary education was at St Columb's College, Derry. He then studied marine biology in Edinburgh before studying theology as a lay student at St. Patrick's College, Maynooth. He briefly worked as a teacher in Dublin.

== Writer ==
=== Journalism ===
As a journalist, Kelly was a contributing columnist to the Irish Examiner, and also wrote for the Irish Mail on Sunday. Following the resignation of editor Simon Rowe in mid-2004, Kelly was briefly acting editor (and later deputy editor) of The Irish Catholic.

=== Kathy O'Beirne book ===
In 2007, Kelly wrote a book titled Kathy's Real Story which disputed the claims made in a book by Kathy O'Beirne (Don't Ever Tell), in which O'Beirne described childhood abuse she had reputedly suffered in a Magdalene asylum. Kelly claimed that initial doubts that he had while reading her book were confirmed by inconsistencies in different accounts which O'Beirne had given, and later confirmed by various witnesses and documentary evidence. He also claimed that false allegations were being made by those appearing before the Residential Institutions Redress Board in order to receive compensation.

A review by Gene Kerrigan (who worked alongside Michael Sheridan, O'Beirne's co-author) criticised Kelly's own criticism of O'Beirne's book. Kelly and O'Beirne both appeared on Ireland AM to discuss their books in November 2007, and the encounter ended in an argument.

Kelly also wrote to the proposed publishers of a sequel by O'Beirne, sending them a copy of Kathy's Real Story and asking them not to publish. A Sunday Times article of July 2009 indicated that the publisher had withdrawn their initial offer to publish her book because of an "unresolved legal issue".

== Politics ==
=== European Union ===
Kelly was formerly a press officer for Nigel Farage, and the director of communications for Europe of Freedom and Direct Democracy (EFDD), of which Farage was co-president. The EFDD dissolved in mid-2019. In a 2023 Irish Times article, Farage described Kelly as a "big strong strapping Paddy".

Kelly supports Ireland leaving the European Union (an 'Irexit'), and is the president of the far-right Irish Freedom Party, which advocates the same position. He contested the 2019 European Parliament election in the Dublin constituency, receiving 2,441 (0.67%) first preference votes and was eliminated on the fourth count.

As of 2021 Kelly was press officer to Romanian MEP Cristian Terheș of the European Conservatives and Reformists group, who has consistently declined to show an EU Digital COVID Certificate or proof of COVID-19 testing upon entering the European Parliament.

Kelly unsuccessfully contested the Midlands–North-West constituency at the 2024 European Parliament elections. He was eliminated on the thirteenth count, with 13,904 (2.04%) first-preference votes.

As of October 2025, Kelly was included on a list of "accredited assistants" for the Danish MEP Anders Vistisen.

=== National politics ===
Kelly was a candidate for the Irish Freedom Party in the Louth constituency at the 2024 general election. He was eliminated on the fourteenth count, having polled 2,546 first-preferences (4.0%).

Kelly, who was reputedly removed as IFP president following a party vote in May 2025, was, according to the party website, re-elected as party leader in September 2025. However, in October 2025, the party's Ard Chomhairle led by Michael Leahy, reportedly sought to expel Kelly from the IFP. As Kelly stated that he had been re-elected as party president in September 2025, the matter resulted in what The Phoenix magazine described as a "split" between factions within the party. On 12 October 2025, Leahy stated that Kelly had been expelled from the IFP.

=== Political views ===
Kelly advocates for Ireland to leave the European Union and for a united Ireland. Kelly is economically liberal, and has questioned the financial cost of Ireland's EU contributions.

His party, the Irish Freedom Party, is anti-abortion, pro-natalist and "supportive of stable families for procreation". Kelly has described his views as representing "Irish Catholic nationalism".

Some outlets have linked Kelly with alt-right ideologies, pointing to a YouTube interview in which Kelly appeared alongside far-right British Loyalist and former British National Party member Jim Dowson. In the video Kelly stated that "[they want to] kill Irish kids and [..] replace them with every nationality who wants to come into our country", a statement which several news outlets associated with the white nationalist "great replacement" conspiracy theory. This followed a similar interview, in January 2019 with LifeSiteNews, in which Kelly denounced what he called the "great replacement of our children". In a 2019 Twitter post, Kelly stated that "those talking about a Great Replacement in Ireland have a point". Later in 2019, Kelly stated that, before an Irish government could make policy changes which result in "population increases [..] immigration or otherwise, it must first consult the people of Ireland". He used the phrase "abort and import" to describe Sinn Féin immigration policy. In interviews and Twitter posts, Kelly has stated that he does not support the idea of separate races or racial superiority, while also advocating for a "mono cultural society".
