= Justin Barrett =

Irish far-right activist (born 1971)

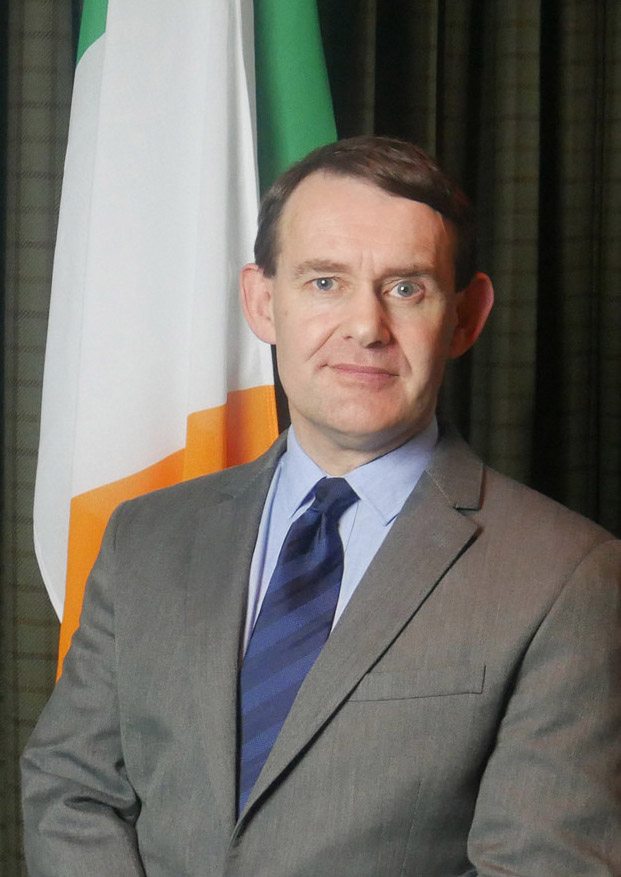
- Barrett in 2017

Leader of Clann Éireann
- Incumbent
- Assumed office April 2024
- Preceded by: Position established

Leader of the National Party
- In office 16 November 2016 – July 2023
- Deputy: James Reynolds (until 2023)
- Preceded by: Position established
- Succeeded by: James Reynolds

Leader of Youth Defence
- In office 2000–2004

Personal details
- Born: 13 April 1971 (age 55) Cork, Ireland
- Party: Clann Éireann (2024–); National Party (2016–2023); Fine Gael (1991)
- Spouse(s): Rebecca Barrett; Bernadette Barrett (div.)
- Children: 9
- Education: Athlone Regional Technical College (dropped out)
- Known for: Anti-abortion activism; Anti-immigration activism; Far-right politics
- Other names: Justin Slevin

Justin Barrett (born 13 April 1971) is an Irish far-right and neo-Nazi political activist. He was leader of the National Party from 2016 until July 2023; from then until 2025, both he and his former deputy, James Reynolds, claimed sole leadership of the party.

Barrett's activism began in the 1990s, with the anti-abortion campaign group Youth Defence. He campaigned against the Treaty of Nice in 2002 and founded the National Party in 2016. Barrett and the National Party campaigned for a No vote in the 2018 abortion referendum through the Abortion Never campaign, which functioned as "an Irish nationalist anti-abortion campaign". Barrett has never held or been elected to any public office. He contested the 2004 European Election as an independent, receiving 2.4% of the vote in the East constituency and failing to be elected. Barrett also contested the 2021 Dublin Bay South by-election for the National Party, receiving 183 first-preference votes (0.68%), thus failing to be elected.

His early activism focused mostly on campaigning in Irish referendums from a Eurosceptic, anti-abortion, anti-immigration, and social conservative perspective. He subsequently however moved towards far-right politics and co-founded the National Party. Barrett has attracted controversy for making racist and homophobic remarks. In September 2019, he controversially implied that, if in power, he would strip the Irish citizenship rights of local government politician Hazel Chu, an Irish-born woman of Chinese-descent who has lived in Ireland her entire life.

Described by The Phoenix as a Neo-Nazi, and associated with Neo-Nazi groups since 2002, Barrett has publicly quoted Adolf Hitler's Mein Kampf, performed Nazi salutes, engaged in Holocaust denial, and in 2023, appeared at an anti-immigration protest wearing a Nazi uniform. In 2024, he praised Hitler as "the greatest leader of all time". Barrett's wife has also described the two as being national socialists.

A statement on the National Party's website in July 2023 stated he had been removed as leader and was replaced by James Reynolds. Barrett has denied being ousted from the National Party. However, his ousting was confirmed by the Electoral Commission in September 2025. As of April 2024, he was the leader of an unregistered political group called Clann Éireann.

== Early life ==
Barrett was born in Cork city in 1971 and was adopted when he was five years old by a family in Borrisokane, County Tipperary. Slevin was his adopted parents' name. He identified as Justin Slevin for a period but eventually settled on Barrett, his biological parents' name. Barrett began a course in Business Studies at Athlone RTC, but dropped out in 1992 to become involved in anti-abortion activism in response to the X-Case judgement. In 1991, he appeared before a district court for shoplifting a pair of shoes from Dunnes Stores in Athlone.

== Political activism ==
=== Early activism (1987–1991) ===
In 1991, he was involved in Young Fine Gael but left because of what he called the cynicism of the party.

=== Youth Defence (1992–2004) ===
From 1992, he became actively involved in the Irish anti-abortion movement, becoming the leader of Youth Defence. As a student in Athlone RTC, he unsuccessfully contested the election for the Presidency of Union of Students in Ireland. During the 1995 divorce referendum, he was spokesman for the Youth Against Divorce campaign. In later years, Barrett himself sought a divorce in 2016.

In April 1999, Barrett and seven other Youth Defence members were convicted of public order offences for a protest described at the time as a "mini-riot" outside the Adelaide Hospital that had taken place on 16 May 1998. Despite requests from hospital staff, the son of a dying woman and Gardaí to be quiet, a Youth Defence protest outside the hospital got louder and lead to "pandemonium" when Gardaí intervened. Some of the convictions were successfully appealed, two years later, and while Barrett's appeal was disallowed, he was given the benefit of the Probation Act, meaning no criminal conviction was recorded against him.

He was also involved in the campaign against the 2002 abortion referendum. He left Youth Defence in 2004 because he thought their methods of campaigning and interacting with people were becoming increasingly extreme and counterproductive. By 2016, Youth Defence were claiming to have never heard of Justin Barrett, or ever to have had any dealing with him.

=== No to Nice Campaign ===
In 2001, a referendum was held in Ireland to approve the Treaty of Nice. However the Treaty of Nice was rejected by 54% of the Irish people in what is known as the Nice I referendum. The following year a second referendum was held on the Treaty of Nice, known as the Nice II referendum. Justin Barrett campaigned against the Nice Treaty in both referendums. Barrett, then 31 years-old, established the No to Nice campaign with Rory O'Hanlon, a retired High Court judge.

During the second Nice campaign, Barrett became the centre of a controversy over his participation in neo-fascist events in Germany and Italy. Barrett initially denied, and subsequently admitted that he had spoken at an event organised by the NPD, a far right, ultranationalist political party. Justin Barrett stated that he spoke at these events in an anti-abortion capacity on behalf on the Youth Defence Organisation.

=== 2004 European Parliament election ===
In 2004, Barrett announced his independent candidacy for the European Parliament election of the same year for the East constituency. He set up his headquarters in Drogheda, an area which had experienced a large influx of non-nationals. Gerry McGeough, a former Provisional IRA volunteer and Sinn Féin national executive member, defected to Barrett's campaign. Barrett also supported the Citizenship referendum which was held on the same day as the European Parliament election.

Barrett's campaign focused on immigration, Euroscepticism and abortion. Barrett employed nationalist rhetoric during his campaign and stated his intention to "put Ireland first" in the European Parliament. Barrett campaigned alongside his wife at the time Bernadette and their son Michael.

He achieved 10,997 first preference votes or 2.4% of the total vote in the East constituency and failed to be elected.

Later that year, while attending an immigration debate at University College Dublin's Literary & Historical Society, Barrett was assaulted by attendees allegedly belonging to an Irish anti-fascist group. The debate was chaired by popular RTÉ radio presenter Joe Duffy, and featured Áine Ní Chonaill of Immigration Control Platform.

=== National Party (2016–2023) ===
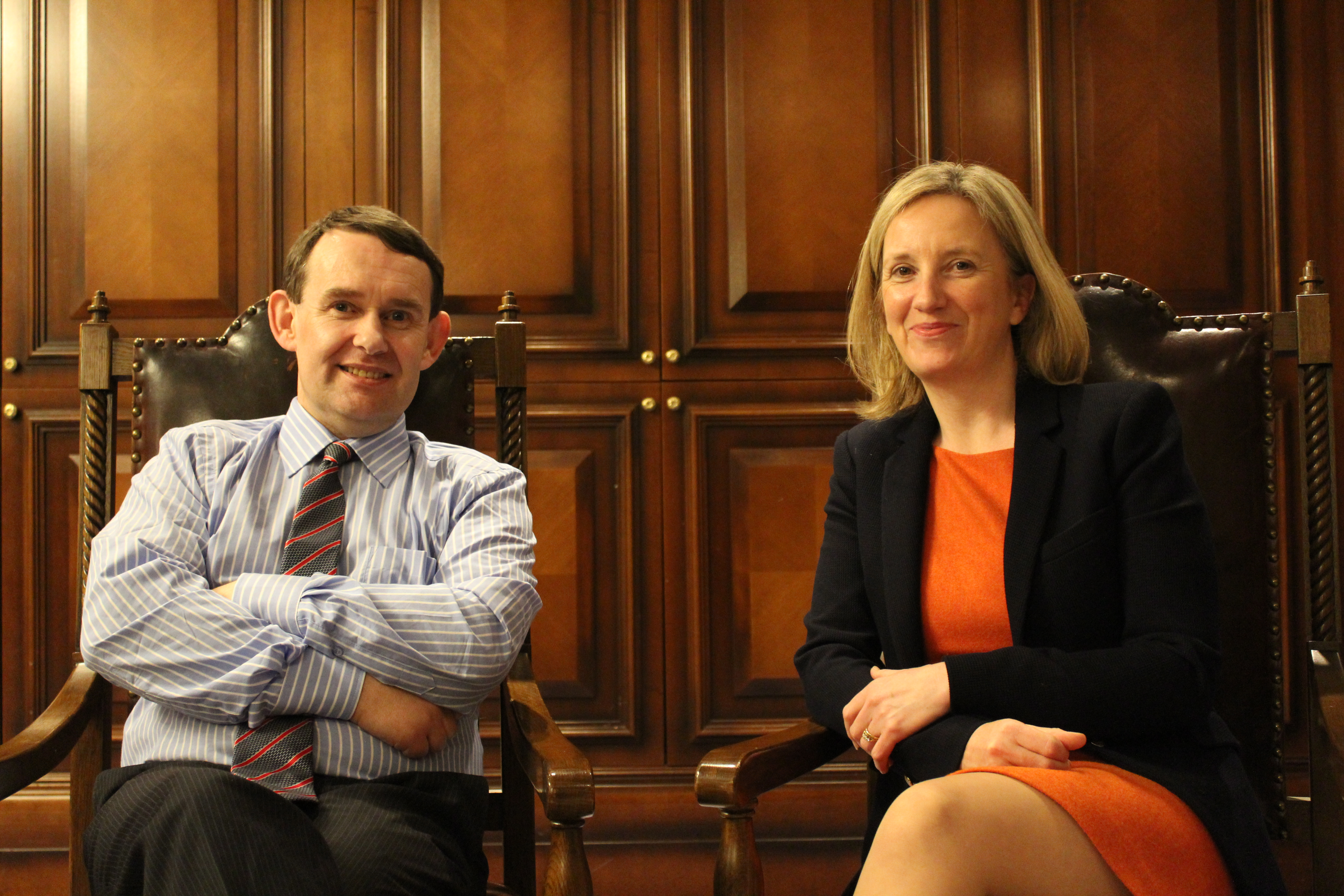
Barrett being interviewed by Gemma O'Doherty in 2019

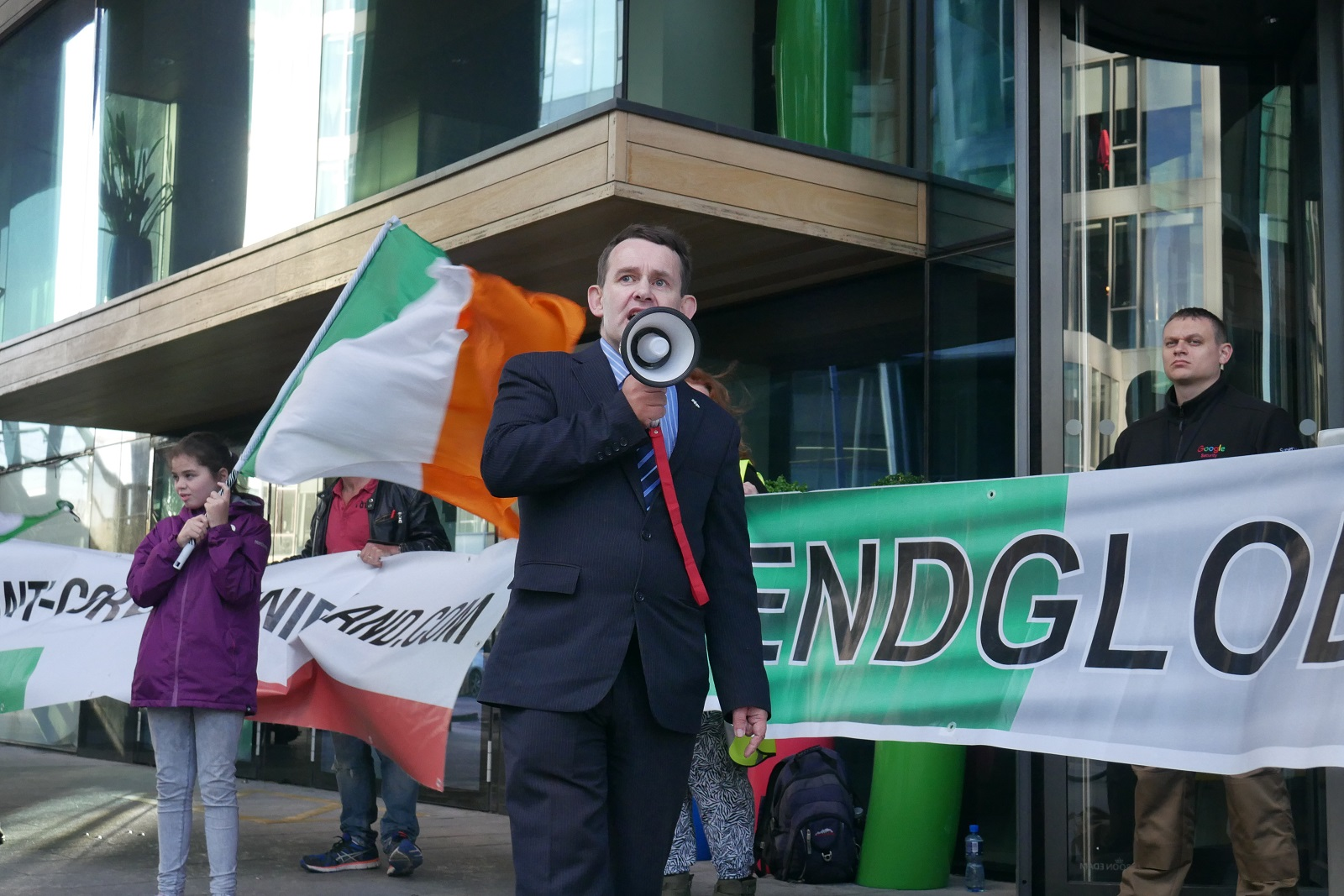
Barrett delivering a protest speech outside Google's European headquarters in Dublin in 2019

In a press release in November 2016, Justin Barrett announced that he was President of the newly founded National Party, a political party that would oppose multi-culturalism and abortion. While Barrett had previously promoted the idea of a "Catholic republic", the National Party states that it is a secular party. The party was due to be publicly launched in a press event on 17 November 2016 at the Merrion Hotel in Dublin. However, after a public backlash, the hotel cancelled the event. Barrett called for a complete ban on Muslims entering Ireland and for the introduction of racial profiling. The party formally registered in early April 2019. Barrett has stated that the party is "only for straight Irish people".

While a Eurosceptic, Barrett does not advocate leaving the European Union ("Irexit"). Quoted in August 2019, Barrett reputedly believes that Ireland could have entered bilateral negotiations with the United Kingdom immediately after the Brexit referendum in 2016 and agreed to a separate deal with the British and then to have the EU accept that deal as part of their own negotiations with the British government. He criticised the Irish government and by extension the European Union's handling of Brexit. In September 2019, Barrett was milkshaked in Galway at a National Party protest. In October 2019, he addressed a community meeting in his hometown of Borrisokane on plans to open up a direct provision centre for 80 asylum seekers. An edited, audio-only version of his speech was played on the Claire Byrne Live show on RTÉ One.

As leader of the party, Barrett led the National Party to a total of 4,773 votes (0.2%) in the 2020 Irish general election, failing to win any seats.

In mid-July 2023, the National Party reportedly issued a statement saying Barrett had been removed as president of the party. Barrett disputed this and claims to still lead the party. Following his purported removal, he reported two senior members to the Gardaí for allegedly removing €400,000 worth of gold owned by the party from a vault in Dublin 4.

==== National Party leadership dispute and formation of Clann Éireann breakaway group ====
In late September 2023, James Reynolds, who also claims the leadership of the party, released a statement via the official party website outlining reasons for Barrett's alleged dismissal, which highlighted his "immense character flaws, outrageous decisions, and lack of interest in serious political activities" as well as having "no medium or long-term vision apart from a fanciful belief in an impending economic Armageddon which would inexplicably propel the National Party to power". He was also accused of theft by other members of the National Party, who accused him of having "sticky fingers" and of using party funds for personal purposes. The Electoral Commission found no evidence of criminality by his opponents or evidence that an AGM held in 2024 to remove him had been "rigged" or that there was any "coup". The Electoral Commission confirmed his removal in September 2025.

In April 2024, Barrett announced that he had formed a new organisation called 'Clann Éireann' (Irish for 'Family Ireland'). He insisted it was not a political party, and that he had not conceded the leadership of the National Party to Reynolds. He used the organisation to attack the Reynolds-led faction within the National Party, and rallied support for his side in the leadership dispute. An article from the Irish Times in July 2024, said that Clann Éireann is believed to have less than 20 members.

=== 2018 Irish abortion referendum ===
Barrett founded Abortion Never as a No campaign in March 2018 to contest the Irish abortion referendum, 2018. Abortion Never presents itself as "an Irish nationalist anti-abortion campaign". At the launch of the campaign, Barrett stated that if the abortion referendum passed, it would lead to euthanasia for the elderly; "It doesn't just begin with abortion and stop there. It ends in euthanasia, because they already have a plan. You see discussions in the newspapers sometimes, 'What are we going to do about the pensions crisis?'". At the same event, he called for the abortion referendum campaign to be "as divisive as possible". Ultimately, the referendum was approved by 66.4% of voters, with a 64.1% turnout.

In April 2018, Jim Jefferies featured Barrett on a segment of The Jim Jefferies Show. Jefferies had Barrett travel to London for an interview on abortion (despite already being in Ireland to interview Tara Flynn), "so he could endure the same kind of bullshit every Irish woman has to go through if they want an abortion".

=== 2021 Dublin Bay South by-election ===
In June 2021, he announced he would be running for public office for the first time as leader of the National Party, in the 2021 Dublin Bay South by-election, caused by the resignation of Eoghan Murphy. Using the campaign slogan "Right So Far", he finished 11th of 15 candidates, gaining 0.68% of first-preferences, with 183 votes. He was eliminated on the third count. The seat went to Ivana Bacik of the Labour Party.

=== 2024 European Parliament election ===
Barrett was a National Party candidate for the Midlands–North-West constituency at the 2024 European Parliament election, in which he received 4,086 (0.6%) first preference votes, and was eliminated on the sixth count. His wife, Rebecca Barrett, ran as a National Party candidate in the Dublin constituency, which also included Patrick Quinlan (deputy leader of the Reynolds faction). Neither were successful.

== Publications ==
Barrett self-published a book in 1998 in which he set out his political principles and advocated the creation of a "Catholic Republic". Entitled The National Way Forward!, in its text he described immigration as "genocidal", and cited Hilaire Belloc, G. K. Chesterton and Arthur Penty as having been influential figures in his philosophical development. He also promoted the work of Father Denis Fahey. During the 2002 Nice Treaty referendum campaign, some of the ideologies in Barrett's 1998 book The National Way Forward! were queried by those advocating a "yes" vote, and it was noted that the book had "mysteriously disappeared from bookshelves during the campaign". Some commentators suggested that the "Barrett controversy" had shifted focus away from other issues and assisted the "yes" campaign.

== Controversies ==
=== Interactions with neo-Nazi and neo-fascist groups ===
==== National Democratic Party of Germany ====
Barrett spoke at events organised by the neo-Nazi National Democratic Party of Germany (NPD) several times, and was the guest of honour at a NPD rally in Passau, Germany in 2000, in which anti-semitic speeches, peppered with quotes from Adolf Hitler were given, alongside claims that "Germany was the biggest victim of the second World War", and at which hundreds of skinheads gave standing ovations to elderly Nazis. The NPD confirmed that they had been in contact with Youth Defence for at least 6 years before.

Justin Barrett was an honorary guest at our event in Passau. I invited him. He sat with the delegates. We have been in contact with his group since 1996. We are friendly with his Youth Defence organisation.

— Holger Apfel, then deputy leader of the NPD

He attended two conferences, in October 1999 and 2000, organised by the youth wing of the NPD, the Junge Nationalisten (JN), alongside American white nationalist William Luther Pierce. The JN has spoken about how Youth Defence were an important part of their network.

Of particular attraction was the participation of... the leader of the National Alliance from the USA, Dr William Pierce and, last but not least, the leader of a noteworthy Irish anti-abortion group, Justin Barret (sic) from Youth Defense (sic).

— Young National Democrats (JN) report on the 1999 conference

The National Party and Barrett have stated that he addressed meetings all across Europe in his capacity as an anti-abortion speaker. He has stated that he regrets "not being more careful" regarding his attendance of events held by the NPD in Germany.

A leading far-right politician in Germany has described the anti-abortion group Youth Defence as "an important part of our international network". Youth Defence is the backbone of the No to Nice Campaign, whose chief spokesman is Mr Justin Barrett. ... Mr Sascha Rossmüller, leader of the Young National Democrats (JN), youth wing of the extremist National Democratic Party (NPD), told The Irish Times: "share many important interests." The German authorities say the JN began to take on neo-Nazi characteristics in 1996.

==== Forza Nuova (Italy) ====
In June 2001, the website of neo-Fascist group Forza Nuova reported that Justin Barrett had attended a number of their events in Italy (in Milan, and Bologna). He attended and spoke at a Forza Nuova meeting in Milan in November 2002. Barrett shared a platform with Roberto Fiore at a rally of Italian fascists at the Hotel Miramar on 20 and 21 July 2001, in the Italian city of Civitanova Marche. At the rally, Barrett was joined by Mario Di Giovanni, Youth Defence's representative in Italy. A group of Forza Nuova students, led by the then 25-year-old Marco Gladi, visited Ireland in 2001 to "study" with Youth Defence. In an editorial on the Forza Nuova website, the movement calls itself a "friend" of Barrett and praises his efforts to defeat the Nice Treaty.

As part of the dirty war waged by "liberals" against "nationals", the greatest exponent of the nationalist front Justin Barrett, he was attacked in a press campaign of the kind to which we were accustomed us in the past. FN and NPD are, in the mind of the accusers, friends whose Barrett should be ashamed

— Forza Nuova website in October 2002

=== Homophobic remarks and activities ===
In 2017, during the party's first ard-fheis held at the Trump International Golf Links and Hotel Ireland, Barrett stated that the National Party was "only for straight Irish people" and defended perceived homophobic comments made by James Reynolds, causing guest speaker John Wilson to walk out of the event in protest.

In 2020, Barrett was involved in the organisation of protests against the Minister for Children, Roderic O'Gorman, and attended these protests alongside members of the National Party. O'Gorman had been attacked by members of the Irish far-right on social media after his appointment as Minister for Children, due to tweeting a photo of himself with Peter Tatchell at a Dublin Pride parade in 2018. Tatchell had previously attracted controversy for statements made in 1997 regarding the age of consent laws in Britain. Tatchell later clarified these remarks, saying sex with children was impossible to condone. "This means I condemn it—I oppose adults having sex with children." During a protest, Barrett riled up the crowd against a group of anti-homophobia counter-protestors, causing attendees to rush at the smaller group of counter-protestors and resulting in Garda intervention.

O'Gorman said that he was unaware of the views expressed by Tatchell 20 years previously, stating he "probably would have re-considered taking a photo with him" had he read the 1997 letter before the march. He continued, "I would have seen him primarily as an advocate for LGBT rights in the UK in the 1990s and 2002 but more recently particularly vocal on treatment of LGBT people in Russia and Chechnya." While Barrett alleged that O'Gorman was a "paedophile apologist", O'Gorman has publicly stated his condemnation of paedophilia and stated that the accusations made against him were "rooted in homophobia".

=== Racist remarks ===
In a September 2019 video, Barrett stated that if his party were to gain power he would revoke the Irish citizenship of Green Party councillor and later Lord Mayor of Dublin, Hazel Chu. Chu was born in Dublin to immigrants from Hong Kong and lived in Ireland since birth. Barrett stated, "She is an Irish citizen, I accept that, that is the law until we get the law in our own hands". Later, a Twitter account operated by Barrett's wife made disparaging and racist comments towards Chu. Chu, in response, stated that she refused to be intimidated by such tactics.

=== Court appearances ===
Barrett has been before the courts for a number of offences, including for directing threatening language against members of An Garda Síochána, public order offences outside a hospital, and driving without a driving licence or car insurance.

In January 2021, a car being driven by Barrett was seized by Gardaí after it emerged it had not been taxed since November 2019. Barrett was investigated by Gardaí for alleged road traffic offences and breach of COVID-19 pandemic travel restrictions. In October 2021, in an appearance before Longford District Court, he was charged with driving without a licence or insurance, and with failing to produce both documents and an NCT certificate within ten days. Arising from the same incident, which occurred in Clonfin, County Longford, he was also accused of engaging in threatening and abusive behaviour contrary to the Public Order Act. He remained silent at the hearing and his solicitor said that he was reserving his position and made a motion for the disclosure of prosecution evidence. The judge granted the order and remanded Barrett on bail until a sitting of Longford District Court on 23 November 2021.

=== 2023 Dublin riot ===
On 23 November, he shared messages on Telegram that read "1000 people are already at the spire. All hands on deck. Defend our kids" and posted that "I want the storm to break loose!".

=== Pro-Hitler and pro-Nazi activities ===
In 2022, Barrett posted a quote from Adolf Hitler's Mein Kampf on his Telegram page. His open admiration for Hitler led rival far-right leader Hermann Kelly to comment "Justin Barrett is a completely different animal, where the vast majority of people in the National Party had no interest in national socialism or a fetish about Adolf Hitler but Justin did and Justin Barrett was the one who was quoting Mein Kampf, which is very damaging". He has also given Nazi salutes, for which he was condemned by James Reynolds.

On 9 November 2023, Barrett appeared at an anti-immigration protest outside Leinster House wearing a Nazi SS uniform. When he attempted to give a speech, he was jeered. The Irish Examiner described it as "a not particularly well received speech". He was denounced in a statement published by the National Party for engaging in a "pathetic publicity stunt" described as "an effort to discredit the protest and grab a headline for himself".

Barrett, who was described by The Phoenix as a Neo-Nazi in August 2024, described Hitler as the "greatest leader of all time" in September 2024. He reportedly dressed in "Hitler-style attire" during a demonstration in a Dublin park in September 2025.

== Personal life ==
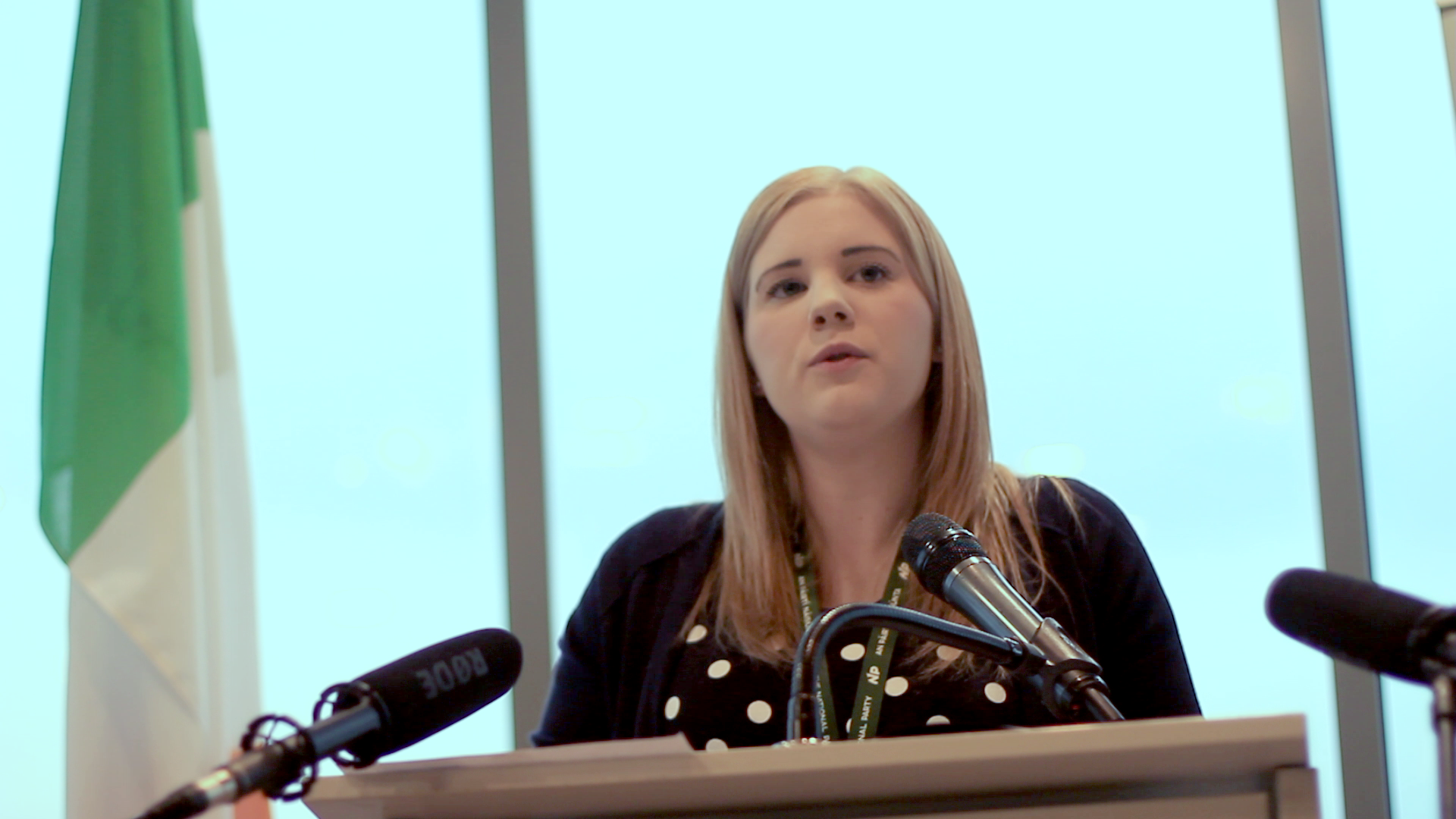
Rebecca Barrett in 2019

In 2004, Justin Barrett was married to Bernadette Barrett (née Carroll). He said he was incapable of looking after his own children for longer than "four or five hours" without his wife. He divorced his first wife in 2017. Having previously campaigned against the legalisation of divorce, Barrett denied that he was being hypocritical, stating that he had "changed his mind" on divorce. In 2016, he claimed he was "never married" [sic], despite having been legally married to Ms Carroll and having four children with her.

Barrett later married Rebecca, a primary school teacher from Limerick, and they have five children as of 2024. She is also a member of the National Party and was a candidate in the 2020 Irish general election for the Limerick City constituency. She received 345 (0.7%) first preference votes and was eliminated on the second count.

In November 2020, she responded to a tweet by then-Lord Mayor of Dublin Hazel Chu, placing a fake order for Chinese takeaway food with "no bat". The tweet was widely condemned as racist and subsequently removed by Twitter for violating the platform's rules.

Both Justin and Rebecca Barrett have reportedly described themselves as "Irish National Socialists", and posted "pro-Hitler content on [...] social media". For example, on 20 April 2025, coinciding with Hitler's birthday, Rebecca Barrett Tweeted an image of birthday cake alongside a mug with Hitler's face on it.

Justin Barrett has previously described himself as a "practicing Catholic" who "takes his cue from the authentic Social Teaching of the Catholic Church".

=== Health ===
Barrett had a heart attack in May 2025. It was his second heart attack.

== See also ==
- Abortion in the Republic of Ireland
- Niamh Uí Bhriain
