= The Irish Catholic =

Irish religious newspaper

- Type: Weekly religion-orientated newspaper
- Format: Compact
- Owner: Grace Communications Ltd
- Founder(s): T. D. Sullivan, MP
- Editor-in-chief: Garry O'Sullivan
- Managing editor: Vacant
- General manager: Hoai Le O'Sullivan
- Founded: 1888
- Political alignment: Roman Catholicism
- Headquarters: The Irish Catholic, Unit 3B, Block 3, Bracken Business Park, Bracken Road, Sandyford, Dublin 18
- Circulation: Unknown - not ABC audited
- Website: irishcatholic.com/

The Irish Catholic is a 40-page Irish weekly newspaper providing news and commentary about the Catholic Church.

The newspaper is privately owned by editor-in-chief Garry O’Sullivan, managed by a private limited company and independent of the Catholic hierarchy in Ireland. Unusual among nationally available newspapers, it is not a member publication of the Press Council of Ireland, and so is not answerable to the Office of the Press Ombudsman.

== History ==
The Irish Catholic was founded in 1888 by Timothy Daniel Sullivan, a former Lord Mayor of Dublin and an Irish Parliamentary Party (IPP) MP at Westminster. A number of the paper's early staff, including Patrick Fogarty, had worked at The Nation newspaper.

From 18 July 1891 it was published under the title The Irish Catholic and Nation, it reverted to The Irish Catholic on 13 June 1896.

William Francis Dennehy ran the paper from 1888 until his death in 1917. Following a split in the IPP, Dennehy was an outspoken anti-Parnellite and supporter of Tim Healy; an editorial which he published on the death of Charles Stewart Parnell, implying that the dead man had probably gone to Hell, was widely criticised by Parnell supporters. Dennehy was a close associate of William Martin Murphy.

Leo Fogarty, Patrick's son, was managing director of The Irish Catholic from 1936 until 1977. Bill Horgan became chairman in 1982 and Otto Herschan was appointed Managing Director in 1982. The businessman and former senator Patrick W. McGrath became a director in 1980, he also owned the paper along with Horgan.

John Ryan was editor from 1936 until 1981, the longest-serving editor in the history of the publication. John Ryan was replaced by Nick Lundberg in 1981 who was in turn succeeded by Brigid Anne Ryan, so far the only female editor of the newspaper, which currently employs no women journalists. Ryan was replaced by David Quinn in 1996.

The paper's offices were on 55 Middle Abbey Street, Dublin, before moving to 55 Lower Gardiner Street, Dublin 1, where there was a sign fixed to the front of the building. The paper later moved to the Irish Farm Centre in Bluebell, before relocating to Donnybrook and then to the headquarters of St Joseph's Young Priests' Society in Merrion Square, Dublin. The new office is located in the Sandyford Business district of Dublin city.

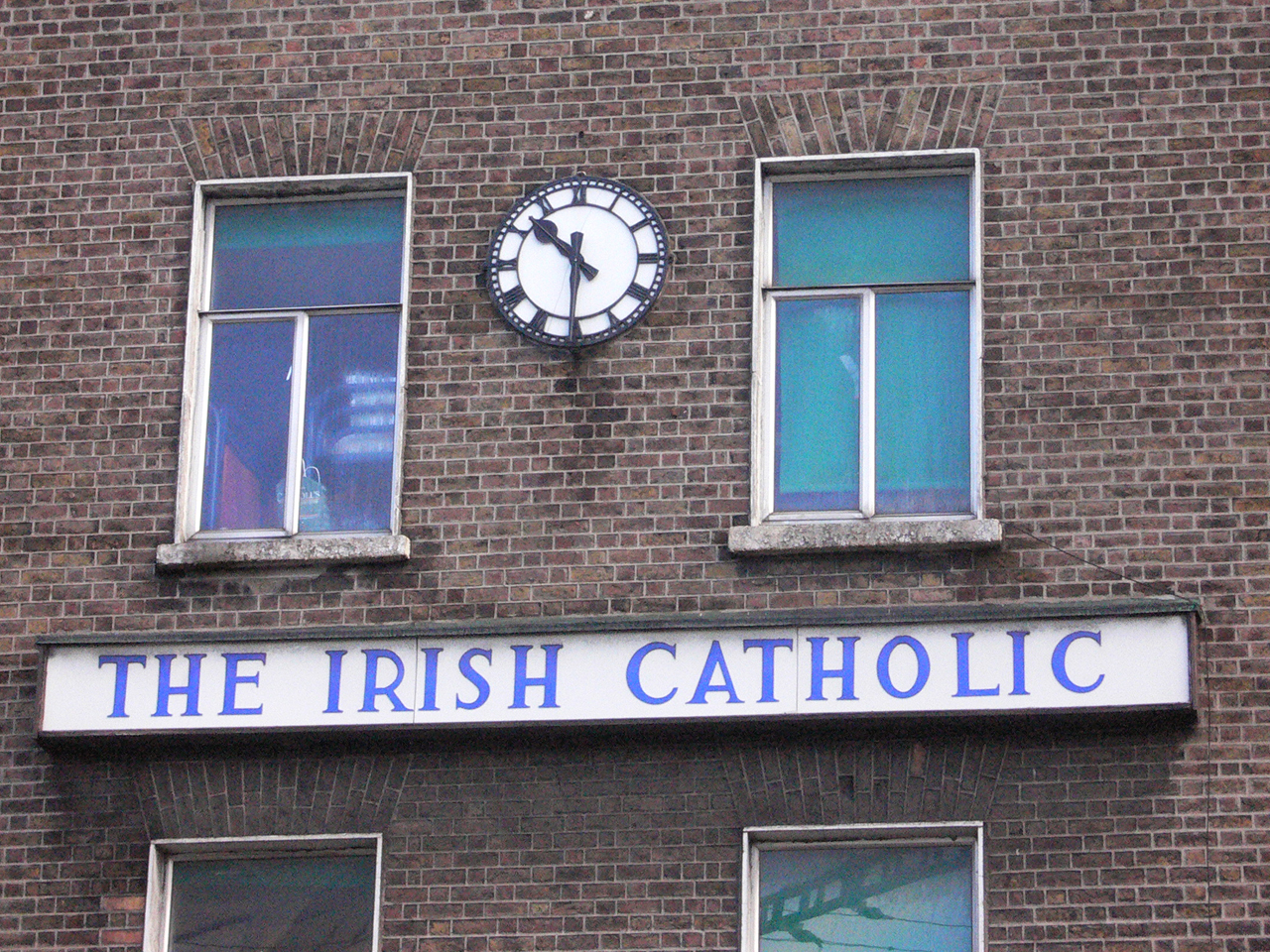
The former offices of the Irish Catholic in Lower Gardiner Street.

When David Quinn resigned in 2003 to work for the Irish Independent, Simon Rowe, a member of Opus Dei, was appointed as editor. Simon Rowe resigned after only nine months with the newspaper, over the publication of an article that criticised the Irish bishops' conference. Following Rowe's departure, Hermann Kelly was acting editor of the paper from June 2004 to 1 January 2005, at which point the paper’s sales had reached 27,177 copies. The Board of Directors then appointed Garry O'Sullivan as editor, and he took up his post in January 2005. He was a former reporter with the newspaper and communications manager with the Jesuits in Ireland.

In 2012, with sales at 22,000 and declining in line with the Irish newspaper industry in general, O’Sullivan purchased the newspaper, and in October 2012 became editor-in-chief. Michael Kelly, who had been deputy editor and Rome correspondent previously, became editor under him.

The Irish Catholic claims to have 90,000 readers based on a print circulation of 30,000 copies. This is despite sales having dropped to 22,000 in 2012, and despite national newspaper trends, with newspaper sales in Ireland halving between 2009 and 2019. Like many Irish newspapers, The Irish Catholic is not ABC-audited, but as it is not a member of the Press Council of Ireland it is not obliged to supply independently verified evidence of its circulation.

== Contributors ==
The paper has a number of journalists and guest contributors, including Mary Kenny (founding member of the Irish Women's Liberation Movement), the psychiatrist Patricia Casey, former TD and government advisor Martin Mansergh, Martin O'Brien (Northern Correspondent), Breda O'Brien, Peter Costello(Books editor), Baroness Nuala O'Loan, and John McGuirk as well as former editor David Quinn and editor-in-chief Garry O'Sullivan.

== Ownership and sale ==
On 2 March 2007, the Irish Independent reported that the Irish Farmers Journal intended to buy The Irish Catholic. The takeover of The Irish Catholic by the Irish Farmers Journal was reported to be complete on 29 March 2007. In March 2012 the Irish Farmers Journal sold it to a group led by the paper's managing editor Garry O'Sullivan and is published now by Mr O’Sullivan’s company Grace Communications. In 2016, Grace Communications acquired Columba Book Service, which published religious books under the Columba Press imprint and general interest books under the Currach Press imprint. Grace and The Irish Catholic are the Irish distributors of the two monthly Magnificat prayer book.

Grace Communications has two directors, Garry O'Sullivan and Progressive Democrats co-founder Paul McKay. It regards Tabor Asset Holdings, wholly owned and controlled by Garry O'Sullivan, as its parent company, with Tarsus Media Limited and Zion Media Limited being related co-subsidiaries of Tabor Asset Holdings.

Although company profits dropped from €216,692 for the year ended 30 May 2019 to €170,208 for the year ended 30 June 2020, with vehicles worth €139,950 being bought in the intervening period and Mr O'Sullivan owing the company €104,369 on the latter date, remuneration to the company's two directors was €219,056 for the year ended 30 June 2020.
