= Izzy Kamikaze =

Irish LGBTQ rights activist

Ruth O'Rourke (born 1962 or 1963), better known as Izzy Kamikaze, is an Irish LGBTQ rights activist.

== Life ==
Originally from Carlow, Ireland, she moved to Dublin at the age of 17 when she finished school. Before this, she had never met another openly gay person. She came out at age 19.

Kamikaze began volunteering, campaigning and socialising in the LGBTQ scene in Dublin in the 1980s, of which the Hirschfeld Centre in Temple Bar was the epicentre. One of her first LGBTQ protests regarded the leniency given to the killers of Declan Flynn. She attended the first Dublin Pride in 1983, and then worked to revive the event in 1992.

== Publications ==
- Gibney, Rosemary; Carey, Patricia; Kamikaze, Izzy; Frances, Kate (2005). "Chapter 12 Unity Without Uniformity: Lesbians in Ireland in the 1990s". In Griffin, Gabriele (ed.). Feminist Activism in the 1990s. Hoboken: Taylor and Francis. ISBN 978-0-203-98987-6.
