= Vandalising Ireland =

Nonfiction book by Dr. Eoin Linehan

Vandalising Ireland: How the Government, NGOs, Academia and the Media Are Engineering a New Globalist Ireland
- Author: Dr. Eoin Lenihan
- Language: English
- Publisher: Western Front Books
- Publication date: 2025

Vandalising Ireland: How the Government, NGOs, Academia and the Media Are Engineering a New Globalist Ireland is a 2025 non-fiction book by Irish journalist and commentator Dr. Eoin Lenihan. The book examines contemporary political, social, and economic issues in Ireland, and became a national bestseller following its release.

== Content ==
Linehan argues in the book that the Irish government, in a perceived alliance with the media, academia and NGOs, has undertaken actions to "vandalise" Ireland, or strip it of its identity and replace it with a globalised, multicultural society. He discusses Irish government policies related to topics such as the economy and migration and makes recommendations in various areas. The book calls for a national renewal in Ireland and the creation of a right-wing political alternative.

== Reception ==
Following its publication, Vandalising Ireland became an Irish national bestseller, topping the non-fiction charts for multiple weeks despite some bookstores being reluctant or refusing to stock it. Commercial success was attributed in part to publicity on the X social media platform.

Eoin O'Malley of The Irish Independent described the book as "a strong antidote to the often banal left-liberal analysis we are used to", and not "a warning we should simply ignore". Joe Humphreys of The Irish Times wrote that Lenihan raised legitimate questions about aspects of the Irish media, though described his analysis of the topic as "less nuanced and more conspiratorial".
