= Simon Rowe =

Irish journalist

Simon Rowe is an Irish journalist. He is a former journalist at Business & Finance magazine and producer on Newstalk 106 talk radio station. He is the former editor of The Irish Catholic, from which he resigned after a disagreement over an article which criticised the sale of church property by Ireland's senior prelates. After leaving the Irish Catholic he founded and edited the magazine The Voice Today (which closed in 2006). He has been a contributor on radio and TV including Newstalk 106 and RTÉ.

A graduate in History and Politics from University College Dublin, Rowe also worked as an editor with Ocean Publishing prior to editing The Irish Catholic.

As of 2016, he was writing for the Sunday Independent and Belfast Telegraph on business matters.
