= Nick Delehanty =

Irish activist

Nick Delehanty is an Irish right-wing political content creator and unsuccessful candidate for political office. Delehanty built up an following on social media, primarily criticising Irish immigration policy, and between 2024 and 2025 ran unsuccessfully for Dublin City Council, Dáil Éireann and President of Ireland.

== Early life and career ==
Delehanty was raised on a Tipperary pig farm and attended the elite private school Clongowes Wood College, where he captained the school's rugby team.

He worked as a solicitor in the area of investment funds and asset management before becoming a business owner. Delehanty ran a day care service for dogs on a 10-acre farm in north County Dublin, from 2022 until its liquidation in September 2026 with the loss of 10 jobs. Delehanty cited cost increases to diesel (the closure occurred during the 2026 Iran war fuel crisis) as the main cause of his business failing.

== Politics ==
=== Commentary and accusation of defamation ===
Delehanty had built up an audience on social media by criticising the government's policies on social protection. He has described himself as "a free speech maximalist", supported seizing valuable possessions of international protection applicants, supported a ban on Muslim women workers in the Irish Civil Service wearing face coverings, and supported the right of anyone to wear a headscarf. In September 2025, as Irish tricolour flags were erected on flagpoles publicly by anti-immigration groups, he joined Malachy Steenson and Tommy Robinson in speaking out in favour of them, calling for laws to ban the flying of "foreign" flags independently.

In July 2026, Delehanty was sued in the High Court by newly elected TD Daniel Ennis for “malicious and grossly defamatory” posts Delehanty had made on Twitter. Ennis' lawyers alleged that Delehanty had used "baseless innuendo" that was "clearly designed to cause maximum reputational damage" to Ennis during the latter's successful campaign in the 2026 Dublin Central by-election. Delehanty declined to publicly comment on the allegations against him but said that he denied them and would be defending against them.

=== Electoral candidacies ===
Delehanty was an unsuccessful Independent candidate in the 2024 Dublin City Council election for the South East Inner City ward, in the 2024 Irish general election in the Dublin Bay South consituency, and failed to secure sufficient backing to appear on the ballot for the 2025 Irish presidential election. His campaigns attracted attention due to the slogan which Delehanty featured prominently on his election posters: "Make Crime Illegal".

Delehanty launched his 2025 presidential campaign at a virtual golf bar on Dawson Street by criticising multiculturalism and immigration (citing favourably the policies of English Conservative leader Kemi Badenoch), the practice of rotating Taoisigh, and the Occupied Territories Bill. Delehanty called his campaign launch "a huge day for Ireland", saying his social media posts had won him support across the "length and breadth of the country". Delehanty sought a nomination to the election via securing support from four county councils. In his appeal to councillors, Delehanty said he enjoyed a large appeal among young people, likening himself to recently assassinated American right-wing political commentator Charlie Kirk (with whom he said he disagreed with 80% of his positions).

After failing to secure a nomination, Delehanty joined with far-right commentators including Eddie Hobbs and Declan Ganley in calling for voters to spoil their ballots. When later asked by The Journal if he would have ran his campaign any differently in retrospect, Delehanty replied "Had we hired most professional people in the world, it was never happening, they blocked us … There’s nothing I could do differently."

== Electoral history ==
Party	Election		FPv	FPv%	Result
Independent	Dublin City Council	2024	374	5.1	Eliminated
Independent	Dublin Bay South	2024	1,542	3.9	Eliminated on the 6th count
Independent	Irish presidential election	2025	N/A	N/A	Did not secure nomination for ballot
