= Social Democrats (Ireland) election results =

This article lists the election results of the Social Democrats (Ireland).

== 2016 general election results ==
The party received 3% of first preference votes nationally with its three leaders re-elected on the first count in their respective constituencies.

Denotes candidates elected

Constituency	Candidate	% Votes	Notes
Cork East	Ken Curtin	2.6	
Dublin Bay North	Cian O'Callaghan	5.2	Fingal County Councillor
Dublin Bay South	Glenna Lynch	6.7	
Dublin Central	Gary Gannon	9.7	Dublin City Councillor
Dublin Mid-West	Anne-Marie McNally	6.1	
Dublin North-West	Róisín Shortall	28.5	TD
Dublin South-Central	Liam Coyne	5.7	
Galway West	Niall Ó Tuathail	5.38	
Kildare North	Catherine Murphy	22.7	TD
Limerick City	Sarah Jane Hennelly	5.9	
Limerick County	James Heffernan	7.4	Senator
Meath East	Aisling O’Neill	4.1	
Wexford	Leonard Kelly	2.3	
Wicklow	Stephen Donnelly	20.9	TD

== 2019 by-elections results ==
Denotes candidates elected

Constituency	Candidate	% Votes	Notes
Cork North-Central	Sinéad Halpin	2.5	
Dublin Fingal	Tracey Carey	4.4	
Dublin Mid-West	Anne-Marie McNally	4.1	

== 2020 general election results ==
The party received 2.9% of first preference votes nationally with its two leaders re-elected.

Denotes candidates elected

Constituency	Candidate	% Votes	Notes
Cork North-Central	Sinéad Halpin	2.17	
Cork North-West	Ciarán McCarthy	8.3	
Cork South-Central	Patricia O'Dwyer	1.9	
Cork South-West	Holly Cairns	10.6	Cork County Councillor
Dublin Bay North	Cian O'Callaghan	8.7	Fingal County Councillor
Dublin Bay South	Sarah Durcan	4.5	
Dublin Central	Gary Gannon	9.3	Dublin City Councillor
Dublin Fingal	Paul Mulville	3.5	Fingal County Councillor
Dublin North-West	Róisín Shortall	18.9	TD
Dublin South-Central	Tara Deacy	3.7	
Dublin South-West	Carly Bailey	4.1	South Dublin County Councillor
Dublin West	Aengus Ó Maoláin	1.9	
Dún Laoghaire	Dave Quinn	2.2	Dún Laoghaire–Rathdown County Councillor
Galway East	Peter Reid	2.0	
Galway West	Niall Ó Tuathail	6.0	
Kildare North	Catherine Murphy	19.2	TD
Kildare South	Linda Hayden	2.83	
Limerick City	Jenny Blake	3.9	
Meath West	Ronan Moore	5.7	Meath County Councillor
Wicklow	Jennifer Whitmore	9.9	Wicklow County Councillor

== 2021 by-election results ==
Denotes candidates elected

Constituency	Candidate	% Votes	Notes
Dublin Bay South	Sarah Durcan	3.2	

== 2024 general election results ==
The party received 4.8% first preference votes nationally, its best ever result, under its new leader Holly Cairns.

Denotes candidates elected

Constituency	Candidate	% Votes	Notes
Carlow–Kilkenny	Patricia Stephenson	4.8	
Clare	Hilary Tonge	3.5	
Cork East	Liam Quaide	10.0	
Cork North-Central	Susan Doyle	3.8	
Cork North-Central	Ciarán McCarthy	2.1	
Cork South-Central	Padraig Rice	8.6	
Cork South-West	Holly Cairns	19.9	
Dublin Bay North	Cian O'Callaghan	14.9	
Dublin Bay South	Eoin Hayes	9.1	
Dublin Central	Gary Gannon	13.3	
Dublin Fingal East	Joan Hopkins	10.6	
Dublin Mid-West	Eoin Ó Broin	6.1	
Dublin North-West	Rory Hearne	14.1	
Dublin Rathdown	Sinead Gibney	8.8	
Dublin South-Central	Jen Cummins	8.9	
Dublin South-West	Ross O'Mullane	5.9	
Dublin West	Ellen Murphy	4.9	
Dún Laoghaire	Hugo Mills	7.5	
Galway West	Eibhín Seoighthe	3.6	
Kildare North	Aidan Farrelly	13.3	
Kildare South	Chris Pender	7.3	
Limerick City	Elisa O'Donovan	6.7	
Louth	Niall McCreanor	2.4	
Meath West	Ronan Moore	6.7	
Waterford	Mary Roche	5.1	
Wicklow	Jennifer Whitmore	13.5	

== 2026 by-elections results ==
The party won their first ever by-election.

Denotes candidates elected

Constituency	Candidate	% Votes	Notes
Dublin Central	Daniel Ennis	19.7	Dublin City Councillor
Galway West	Míde Nic Fhionnlaoich	7.0	
