= 2024 Dublin City Council election =

Part of the 2024 Irish local elections

- 7 June 2024
- All 63 seats on Dublin City Council
Party	Vote %	Seats	+/–
Fine Gael	14.7	11	+2
Social Democrats	9.6	10	+5
Sinn Féin	14.0	9	+1
Fianna Fáil	14.3	8	−3
Green	9.8	8	−2
Labour	7.9	4	−4
People Before Profit	5.4	2	0
Right to Change	1.8	1	+1
Independent Ireland	1.1	1	+1
Independent (Note: Independent Left is an unregistered political party and therefore its candidates appeared as indepependent on the ballot paper.)	15.1	8	−1
This lists parties that won seats. See the complete results below.
Results by Local Electoral Area
Council control before	Council control after
Fianna Fáil; Green Party; Labour Party; Social Democrats	Fine Gael; Fianna Fáil; Green Party; Labour Party

An election to all 63 seats on Dublin City Council was held on 7 June 2024 as part of the 2024 Irish local elections. Dublin is divided into 11 local electoral areas (LEAs) to elect councillors for a five-year term of office on the electoral system of proportional representation by means of the single transferable vote (PR-STV).

The period for nominations started at 10 a.m. on Saturday 11 May and ended at 12 p.m. on Saturday 18 May 2024.

== Retiring incumbents ==
The following councillors did not seek re-election:

Constituency	Departing Councillor	Party
Kimmage–Rathmines	Tara Deacy	Social Democrats
South East Inner City	Kevin Donoghue	Labour
Kimmage–Rathmines	Anne Feeney	Fine Gael
Kimmage–Rathmines	Mary Freehill	Labour
Artane–Whitehall	Alison Gilliland	Labour
Clontarf	Jane Horgan-Jones	Labour
Cabra–Glasnevin	Darcy Lonergan	Green
Pembroke	Claire O'Connor	Fianna Fáil
Clontarf	Damien O'Farrell	Independent
Ballymun-Finglas	Noeleen Reilly	Independent
Artane-Whitehall	Patricia Roe	Social Democrats
South West Inner City	Michael Watters	Fianna Fáil

== Results by party ==
Party	Candidates	Seats	±	1st pref	FPv%	±%
Fine Gael	16	11	▲2	21,656	14.74%	▲1.10%
Social Democrats	13	10	▲5	14,057	9.57%	▲2.48%
Sinn Féin	30	9	▲1	20,612	14.03%	▲2.04%
Fianna Fáil	19	8	▼3	21,028	14.31%	▼3.83%
Green	11	8	▼2	14,354	9.77%	▼0.24%
Labour	13	4	▼4	11,649	7.93%	▼2.31%
People Before Profit	11	2	Steady	7,960	5.42%	▲0.93%
Right to Change	2	1	New	2,639	1.79%	New
Independent Ireland	2	1	New	1,672	1.13%	New
Independent Left	1	1	Steady	1,365	0.92%	▼0.39%
Aontú	6	0	Steady	3,806	2.59%	▲2.33%
The Irish People	6	0	New	1,652	1.12%	New
National Party	2	0	New	1,233	0.83%	New
Irish Freedom	1	0	New	658	0.44%	New
Workers' Party	1	0	Steady	321	0.21%	▼0.43%
Independent	38	8	▼1	22,191	15.11%	▲2.35%
Total	172	63	Steady	146,853	100.00%	—N/a

== Results by local electoral area ==
*: Outgoing councillor elected in 2019.
†: Outgoing councillor co-opted subsequent to the 2019 election.
‡: Outgoing councillor co-opted in 2020 for Donaghmede now contesting in Artane–Whitehall.
§: Elected in 2019 to Fingal County Council.
※: Outgoing councillor on Dún Laoghaire–Rathdown County Council.

=== Artane–Whitehall ===
Artane–Whitehall: 6 seats
Party	Candidate	FPv%	Count											
Party	Candidate	FPv%	1	2	3	4	5	6	7	8	9	10	11	12
Independent Left	John Lyons	9.39%	1,365	1,370	1,432	1,476	1,504	1,557	1,578	1,718	1,799	1,833	2,004	2,061
Fine Gael	Declan Flanagan	8.89%	1,292	1,293	1,293	1,302	1,351	1,362	1,632	1,668	1,806	1,986	2,047	2,054
Social Democrats	Jesslyn Henry	8.20%	1,191	1,195	1,226	1,239	1,293	1,340	1,384	1,453	1,626	1,681	1,768	1,795
Fianna Fáil	Rachel Batten	8.13%	1,182	1,185	1,187	1,191	1,233	1,241	1,323	1,368	1,494	2,095		
Social Democrats	Aisling Silke	7.76%	1,128	1,136	1,175	1,176	1,288	1,306	1,378	1,433	1,644	1,768	1,841	1,861
Independent	Kevin Coyle	7.51%	1,091	1,092	1,104	1,272	1,287	1,300	1,308	1,608	1,633	1,648	1,692	1,715
Sinn Féin	Edel Moran	6.52%	967	1,051	1,076	1,082	1,090	1,341	1,352	1,378	1,407	1,441	2,210	
Sinn Féin	Larry O'Toole	6.61%	960	1,045	1,061	1,066	1,085	1,299	1,318	1,340	1,375	1,397		
Fianna Fáil	Aoibheann Mahon	6.20%	901	905	908	914	949	958	1,047	1,072	1,173			
Green	Dearbháil Butler	6.13%	891	895	908	911	957	966	1,002	1,026				
Fine Gael	Linkwinstar Mattathil Mathew	5.56%	808	810	812	814	854	857						
Independent	Ian Croft	4.43%	644	648	664	838	853	861	875					
Sinn Féin	Olive Sloan	4.34%	630	664	669	671	680							
Labour	John Nisbet	3.36%	488	489	497	499								
Independent	Rowan Croft	3.32%	482	482	489									
People Before Profit	Andrew Keegan	1.82%	264	268										
Sinn Féin	Josh O'Rourke	1.69%	246											
Electorate: 35,178 Valid: 14,530 Spoilt: 431 Quota: 2,076 Turnout: 14,961 (42.53%)

=== Ballyfermot–Drimnagh ===
Ballyfermot–Drimnagh: 5 seats
Party	Candidate	FPv%	Count									
Party	Candidate	FPv%	1	2	3	4	5	6	7	8	9	10
Sinn Féin	Daithí Doolan	15.0	1,849	2,107								
Independent	Vincent Jackson	12.6	1,547	1,586	1,595	1,627	1,750	1,787	1,862	1,934	2,132	
People Before Profit	Hazel De Nortúin	10.6	1,304	1,337	1,357	1,481	1,540	1,565	1,597	1,729	1,825	2,229
Independent Ireland	Philip Sutcliffe Snr	6.7	821	830	831	835	911	968	1,260	1,290	1,613	1,770
Green	Ray Cunningham	8.0	981	987	989	1,131	1,148	1,238	1,242	1,492	1,513	1,752
Fianna Fáil	Daithí de Róiste	7.6	939	948	952	969	1,008	1,185	1,193	1,291	1,328	1,423
Right to Change	Sophie Nicoullaud	6.9	853	870	872	945	974	1,013	1,042	1,119	1,170	
Independent	Dolores Webster	5.5	678	693	698	703	807	822	998	1,018		
Labour	Patrick Dempsey	4.5	551	559	562	657	667	764	770			
Irish Freedom	Barry Ward	5.4	658	665	667	672	719	731				
Fine Gael	Paddy Dingle	4.7	577	582	583	601	612					
Independent	Richard Murray	4.4	543	560	564	577						
Social Democrats	Niamh Mongey	4.3	531	546	552							
Sinn Féin	Mamy Nzema Nkoy	3.3	408									
Independent	Ronda Sheldreck	0.4	47									
Electorate: 31,650 Valid: 12,287 Spoilt: 256 (2.0%) Quota: 2,048 Turnout: 12,543 (39.63%)

=== Ballymun–Finglas ===
Ballymun–Finglas: 6 seats
Party	Candidate	FPv%	Count											
Party	Candidate	FPv%	1	2	3	4	5	6	7	8	9	10	11	12
Fianna Fáil	Keith Connolly	13.40%	2,042	2,043	2,084	2,219								
Sinn Féin	Anthony Conaghan	9.37%	1,428	1,436	1,448	1,454	1,454	1,710	1,805	1,898	1,935	2,006	2,097	2,138
People Before Profit	Conor Reddy	8.20%	1,249	1,264	1,324	1,349	1,351	1,385	1,532	1,593	1,730	1,903	2,069	2,139
Social Democrats	Mary Callaghan	7.72%	1,176	1,176	1,279	1,340	1,344	1,354	1,386	1,436	1,847	1,919	1,943	1,966
Independent	Gavin Pepper	7.39%	1,126	1,196	1,203	1,208	1,208	1,221	1,312	1,605	1,616	1,835	2,452	
Sinn Féin	Leslie Kane	6.88%	1,049	1,055	1,075	1,088	1,089	1,393	1,448	1,480	1,530	1,644	1,696	1,710
Aontú	Edward MacManus	6.25%	952	968	987	1,009	1,010	1,031	1,080	1,123	1,174			
National Party	Stephen Redmond	6.10%	930	962	966	966	966	974	1,039	1,311	1,320	1,476		
Green	Caroline Conroy	5.83%	888	889	959	1,057	1,063	1,071	1,096	1,107				
Fianna Fáil	Briege Mac Oscar	5.68%	865	869	921	1,060	1,085	1,091	1,120	1,138	1,398	1,507	1,599	1,616
Independent	Leon Bradley	5.37%	819	858	867	878	879	915	1,021					
Sinn Féin	Mick Dowling	4.82%	734	738	744	752	753							
Independent	Diarmaid Mac Dubhghlais	4.59%	700	730	748	763	763	777						
Fine Gael	Arnold Guo	3.62%	551	554	592									
Labour	John Lonergan	3.12%	476	481										
Independent	Jeff Gallagher	1.68%	256											
Electorate: 37,296 Valid: 15,241 Spoilt: 341 (2.2%) Quota: 2,178 Turnout: 15,582 (41.78%)

=== Cabra–Glasnevin ===
Cabra–Glasnevin: 7 seats
Party	Candidate	FPv%	Count														
Party	Candidate	FPv%	1	2	3	4	5	6	7	8	9	10	11	12	13	14	15
Green	Feljin Jose	10.97%	1,869	1,872	1,876	1,877	1,880	1,930	1,933	1,937	1,982	2,108	2,112	2,132			
Independent	Cieran Perry	10.42%	1,776	1,796	1,822	1,865	1,920	1,986	2,013	2,105	2,188						
Fine Gael	Colm O'Rourke	9.31%	1,586	1,593	1,606	1,613	1,620	1,630	1,640	1,646	1,649	1,682	1,682	1,712	1,882	1,908	1,937
Fine Gael	Gayle Ralph	9.10%	1,551	1,554	1,560	1,566	1,567	1,572	1,578	1,584	1,586	1,645	1,646	1,697	1,805	1,812	1,859
Social Democrats	Cat O'Driscoll	7.92%	1,350	1,355	1,367	1,371	1,374	1,402	1,418	1,428	1,620	1,691	1,721	1,764	1,807	1,855	1,998
Fianna Fáil	John Stephens	7.83%	1,335	1,341	1,352	1,354	1,356	1,360	1,371	1,374	1,380	1,404	1,404	1,483	1,810	1,823	1,858
Sinn Féin	Seamus McGrattan	6.26%	1,067	1,068	1,069	1,070	1,075	1,082	1,187	1,197	1,222	1,226	1,230	1,263	1,316	1,646	2,457
Labour	Declan Meenagh	5.63%	959	965	968	968	973	1,017	1,031	1,034	1,058	1,318	1,322	1,361	1,406	1,441	1,507
Fianna Fáil	Eimer McCormack	4.65%	792	795	800	805	806	808	817	819	822	846	847	868			
Sinn Féin	Amy Farrell	4.08%	695	696	698	703	704	714	812	812	870	887	893	914	928		
Sinn Féin	Calum Atkinson	4.05%	691	692	694	695	699	708	814	821	867	888	894	924	939	1,325	
Labour	Angela Boyle-Shafer	3.64%	620	623	627	630	631	644	645	645	668						
Aontú	Ian Noel Smyth	3.22%	549	562	568	584	626	630	637	782	795	800	801				
People Before Profit	Léna Seale	2.77%	472	480	483	485	491	545	557	565							
Sinn Féin	Natalie Tracey	2.53%	431	433	435	436	440	444									
Workers' Party	Garrett Greene	1.88%	321	322	329	330	334										
National Party	Jean Murray	1.78%	303	307	313	348	447	456	459								
The Irish People	Mark Joseph Parsons	1.44%	246	257	269	292											
Independent	Sarah Louise Mulligan	0.92%	156	164	181												
Independent	Stephen O Loughlin	0.87%	149	156													
Independent	Martina Whyte	0.74%	126														
Electorate: 39,560 Valid: 17,044 Spoilt: 251 (1.5%) Quota: 2,131 Turnout: 17,295 (43.72%)

=== Clontarf ===
Clontarf: 6 seats
Party	Candidate	FPv%	Count									
Party	Candidate	FPv%	1	2	3	4	5	6	7	8	9	10
Fine Gael	Naoise Ó Muirí	17.59%	3,519									
Fianna Fáil	Deirdre Heney	16.31%	3,263									
Independent	Barry Heneghan	12.26%	2,452	2,525	2,558	2,580	2,989					
Social Democrats	Catherine Stocker	10.94%	2,189	2,285	2,337	2,399	2,442	2,460	2,615	3,163		
Green	Donna Cooney	8.52%	1,705	1,822	1,861	1,873	1,898	1,900	2,120	2,274	2,358	2,546
Labour	Ali Field	8.42%	1,685	1,787	1,823	1,843	1,885	1,886	2,081	2,204	2,303	2,506
People Before Profit	Bernard Mulvany	5.66%	1,132	1,153	1,163	1,193	1,229	1,252	1,286			
Aontú	James Morris	4.92%	984	1,013	1,035	1,045	1,209	1,266	1,362	1,426	1,442	
Independent	Michael Burke	4.54%	909	923	939	950						
Sinn Féin	Paddy Moloney	4.44%	881	886	897	1,260	1,311	1,336	1,366	1,591	1,697	1,866
Fianna Fáil	Ray Dunne	3.70%	741	942	1,120	1,124	1,163	1,168				
Sinn Féin	Alyssa Ní Bhroin	2.70%	541	544	552							
Electorate: 42,253 Valid: 20,001 Spoilt: 221 (1.1%) Quota: 2,858 Turnout: 20,222 (47.86%)

=== Donaghmede ===
Donaghmede: 5 seats
Party	Candidate	FPv%	Count									
Party	Candidate	FPv%	1	2	3	4	5	6	7	8	9	10
Fianna Fáil	Tom Brabazon	20.20%	2,759									
Fianna Fáil	Daryl Barron	11.07%	1,512	1,734	1,763	1,767	1,778	1,804	1,861	1,885	2,133	2,323
Social Democrats	Paddy Monahan	10.16%	1,387	1,411	1,505	1,694	1,721	1,781	1,836	1,908	1,977	2,430
Fine Gael	Supriya Singh	7.59%	1,036	1,067	1,117	1,127	1,128	1,157	1,177	1,197	1,672	1,907
Sinn Féin	Mícheál Mac Donncha	7.26%	992	1,015	1,028	1,070	1,085	1,289	1,337	2,110	2,135	2,265
Labour	Shane Folan	6.90%	943	975	1,046	1,088	1,100	1,130	1,164	1,194	1,329	
Fine Gael	Terence Flanagan	6.88%	939	1,005	1,028	1,031	1,034	1,039	1,088	1,096		
Independent	Michael Burke	6.67%	911	929	942	956	1,159	1,187	1,452	1,474	1,511	1,600
Sinn Féin	Tamara Kearns	4.94%	675	686	697	737	747	1,034	1,068			
Sinn Féin	Clodagh Ó Moore	4.66%	636	657	666	716	730					
Aontú	Proinsias O'Conarain	4.52%	617	629	633	647	740	755				
The Irish People	Peadar MacMillan	3.41%	466	470	477	490						
People Before Profit	Clara McCormack	3.12%	426	431	462							
Green	Donnacha Geoghegan	2.63%	359	372								
Electorate: 30,912 Valid: 13,658 Spoilt: 267 (1.9%) Quota: 2,277 Turnout: 13,925 (45.05%)

=== Kimmage–Rathmines ===
Kimmage–Rathmines: 6 seats
Party	Candidate	FPv%	Count								
Party	Candidate	FPv%	1	2	3	4	5	6	7	8	9
Green	Carolyn Moore	12.21%	2,026	2,030	2,052	2,067	2,132	2,169	2,198	2,202	2,352
Fine Gael	Punam Rane	11.07%	1,837	1,839	1,895	1,902	1,909	1,927	1,957	1,963	2,177
Labour	Fiona Connelly	10.91%	1,811	1,812	1,853	1,877	1,927	2,000	2,046	2,061	2,267
Right to Change	Pat Dunne	10.76%	1,786	1,808	1,815	1,858	2,035	2,231	2,627		
Social Democrats	Eoin Hayes	9.95%	1,652	1,659	1,668	1,700	1,897	1,966	2,019	2,047	2,133
Fine Gael	Patrick Kinsella	9.28%	1,540	1,548	1,622	1,625	1,627	1,649	1,669	1,680	2,133
Fianna Fáil	Michael Connolly	6.31%	1,047	1,051	1,340	1,357	1,364	1,407	1,438	1,455	
Sinn Féin	Jacinta Deignan	5.39%	895	899	903	1,337	1,446	1,546	1,659	1,712	1,760
Independent	Peter Dooley	5.34%	887	958	963	998	1,045				
Independent Ireland	Philip Sutcliffe Snr	5.13%	851	1,021	1,022	1,042	1,088	1,357			
People Before Profit	Shay L'Estrange	4.28%	711	719	721	758					
Sinn Féin	Ciarán Ó Meachair	4.09%	678	684	686						
Fianna Fáil	Deidre Conroy	3.15%	523	528							
The Irish People	Ed Shanahan	1.86%	309								
Independent	Martin Dowling	0.27%	44								
Electorate: 42,747 Valid: 16,597 Spoilt: 301 (1.8%) Quota: 2,372 Turnout: 16,898 (39.53%)

=== North Inner City ===
North Inner City: 7 seats
Party	Candidate	FPv%	Count											
Party	Candidate	FPv%	1	2	3	4	5	6	7	8	9	10	11	12
Fine Gael	Ray McAdam	11.2	1,143	1,149	1,190	1,193	1,243	1,257	1,264	1,373				
Independent	Christy Burke	10.0	1,021	1,030	1,042	1,066	1,087	1,164	1,201	1,239	1,254	1,263	1,462	
Green	Janet Horner	9.5	974	977	992	996	1,066	1,075	1,081	1,140	1,168	1,294		
Independent	Malachy Steenson	8.9	915	951	952	968	974	1,018	1,037	1,038	1,040	1,043	1,198	1,232
People Before Profit	Eoghan Ó Ceannabháin	8.6	875	886	890	898	919	926	939	959	962	1,062	1,089	1,094
Independent	Nial Ring	8.3	854	863	869	882	907	947	972	994	1,001	1,019	1,113	1,154
Sinn Féin	Janice Boylan	8.2	843	845	851	928	940	953	1,164	1,195	1,198	1,224	1,272	1,291
Social Democrats	Daniel Ennis	6.5	667	670	674	693	721	746	775	800	806	1,116	1,167	1,188
Social Democrats	Ellen O'Doherty	5.3	539	544	550	551	589	594	604	621	630			
Independent	Darryl O'Callaghan	5.2	535	552	554	560	566	634	653	660	660	666		
Fianna Fáil	Caio Benicio	3.2	324	355	422	422	434	435	441					
Labour	Tom O'Connor	3.1	313	313	317	323								
Independent	Geraldine Molloy	3.0	308	316	320	327	337							
Sinn Féin	Alan Whelan	2.9	295	298	300	376	384	400						
Sinn Féin	Declan Hallissey	2.7	275	277	278									
Fianna Fáil	Anne-Marie Connolly	1.8	183	196										
Independent	Brian Garrigan	0.8	78											
Fianna Fáil	Isabel Oliveira Da Silva	0.6	66											
Independent	Anthony Shevlin	0.3	28											
Electorate: 30,609 Valid: 10,236 Spoilt: 204 (2.0%) Quota: 1,280 Turnout: 10,440 (34.11%)

=== Pembroke ===
Pembroke: 5 seats
Party	Candidate	FPv%	Count								
Party	Candidate	FPv%	1	2	3	4	5	6	7	8	9
Fine Gael	James Geoghegan	19.92%	2,327								
Green	Hazel Chu	16.89%	1,973								
Labour	Dermot Lacey	16.48%	1,925	1,973							
Fine Gael	Emma Blain	15.34%	1,792	2,046							
Fianna Fáil	Rory Hogan	10.08%	1,177	1,231	1,305	1,337	1,344	1,359	1,396	1,414	1,675
Social Democrats	Karen Hinkson-Deeney	6.26%	731	739	748	759	772	776	882	1,217	1,486
Independent	Linda O'Shea-Farren	5.73%	669	682	694	802	805	812	860	935	
People Before Profit	Mary Martin	3.51%	410	411	413	426	428	428	544		
Sinn Féin	Robert Martin	3.28%	383	384	385	405	406	406			
The Irish People	Conor P. Rafferty	2.52%	294	295	296						
Electorate: 31,927 Valid: 11,681 Spoilt: 112 (0.9%) Quota: 1,947 Turnout: 11,793 (36.94%)

=== South East Inner City ===
South East Inner City: 5 seats
Party	Candidate	FPv%	Count										
Party	Candidate	FPv%	1	2	3	4	5	6	7	8	9	10	11
Green	Claire Byrne	15.0	1,094	1,097	1,099	1,171	1,182	1,237					
Fine Gael	Danny Byrne	10.3	746	750	753	787	809	933	940	970	985	1,011	1,018
Social Democrats	Cian Farrell	8.4	613	621	624	649	666	699	703	717	964	1,014	1,071
People Before Profit	Brigid Purcell	7.2	526	539	549	576	585	611	613	644			
Independent	Mannix Flynn	7.2	520	566	582	596	706	744	747	923	961	1,014	1,053
Fianna Fáil	Liz Watson	7.1	517	521	525	540	556						
Sinn Féin	Dan Céitinn	7.1	513	522	609	620	632	657	659	695	748		
Sinn Féin	Kourtney Kenny	6.9	498	510	661	676	691	764	764	811	920	1,372	
Labour	Carol Reynolds	6.6	477	481	482	625	642	731	736	756	836	909	966
Aontú	Alan Healy	5.4	392	418	467	486	573	591	593				
Labour	Eddie McGuinness	5.3	384	388	403								
Independent	Nick Delehanty	5.1	374	449	452	455							
Sinn Féin	Ryan Mooney	4.8	352	353									
The Irish People	Jeanette Birch	1.3	98										
Independent	Nathan Hastings	1.2	88										
Independent	Francis Rodgers	0.7	47										
Independent	Pat Coyne	0.4	31										
Electorate: 22,538 Valid: 7,270 Spoilt: 167 (2.2%) Quota: 1,212 Turnout: 7,437 (33.00%)

=== South West Inner City ===
South West Inner City: 5 seats
Party	Candidate	FPv%	Count												
Party	Candidate	FPv%	1	2	3	4	5	6	7	8	9	10	11	12	13
Green	Michael Pidgeon	19.2	1,594												
Labour	Darragh Moriarty	12.2	1,017	1,088	1,090	1,123	1,171	1,181	1,205	1,261	1,285	1,323	1,441		
Social Democrats	Jen Cummins	10.9	903	963	964	978	1,006	1,011	1,019	1,082	1,113	1,167	1,235	1,590	
Fianna Fáil	Ammar Ali	10.4	860	870	871	882	890	899	901	916	920	947	1,191	1,227	1,248
Independent	Damien Farrell	8.2	684	686	704	716	738	786	799	862	872	980	993	1,059	1,104
People Before Profit	Kelsey May Daly	7.1	591	606	607	623	644	655	671	695	716	745	753		
Sinn Féin	Máire Devine	5.5	457	462	462	474	486	488	615	628	869	905	918	1,071	1,210
Fine Gael	Ian Nunoo	5.0	412	434	434	451	471	471	475	505	511	532			
Aontú	Aisling Considine	3.8	312	314	315	326	338	406	413	440	452				
Sinn Féin	David Augusta	3.7	306	308	308	314	316	327	374	380					
Independent	Catherine McSweeney	3.3	271	274	279	286	305	340	344						
The Irish People	Gina Ahearne	2.9	239	240	242	248	251								
Sinn Féin	Darragh Reid	2.9	237	240	240	248	263	263							
Independent	Zoe Obeimhen	2.3	193	202	203	229									
Independent	Michael O'Flanagan	2.4	197	201	201										
Independent	Pat Coyne	0.4	34	34											
Electorate: 24,193 Valid: 8,307 Spoilt: 192 Quota: 1,385 Turnout: 8,499 (35.13%)

== Changes ==
=== Co-options ===
Party	Outgoing	LEA	Reason	Date	Co-optee
Fianna Fáil	Tom Brabazon	Donaghmede	Elected to 34th Dáil at the 2024 general election	18 December 2024	Aoibheann Mahon
Social Democrats	Jen Cummins	South West Inner City	Elected to 34th Dáil at the 2024 general election	18 December 2024	Lesley Byrne
Sinn Féin	Máire Devine	South West Inner City	Elected to 34th Dáil at the 2024 general election	18 December 2024	Ciaran Ó Meachair
Fine Gael	James Geoghegan	Pembroke	Elected to 34th Dáil at the 2024 general election	18 December 2024	David Coffey
Social Democrats	Eoin Hayes	Kimmage–Rathmines	Elected to 34th Dáil at the 2024 general election	18 December 2024	Tara Deacy
Independent	Barry Heneghan	Clontarf	Elected to 34th Dáil at the 2024 general election	18 December 2024	Kevin Breen
Fine Gael	Naoise Ó Muirí	Clontarf	Elected to 34th Dáil at the 2024 general election	18 December 2024	Clodagh Ní Mhuirí
Social Democrats	Tara Deacy	Kimmage–Rathmines	Resignation	22 March 2025	Noelle Brown
Social Democrats	Catherine Stocker	Clontarf	Resignation	24 September 2025	Karl Stanley
Social Democrats	Daniel Ennis	North Inner City	Elected to 34th Dáil at the 2026 Dublin Central by-election	22 May 2026	Ellen O'Doherty

=== Changes in affiliation ===
Name	LEA	Elected as	New affiliation	Date
Philip Sutcliffe Snr	Ballyfermot–Drimnagh	Independent Ireland	Independent	23 November 2024
Aisling Silke	Artane–Whitehall	Social Democrats	Independent	29 June 2026
