= North Strand =

Northern residential district of Dublin, Ireland

North Strand An Trá Thuaidh (Irish)
- Inner city neighbourhood
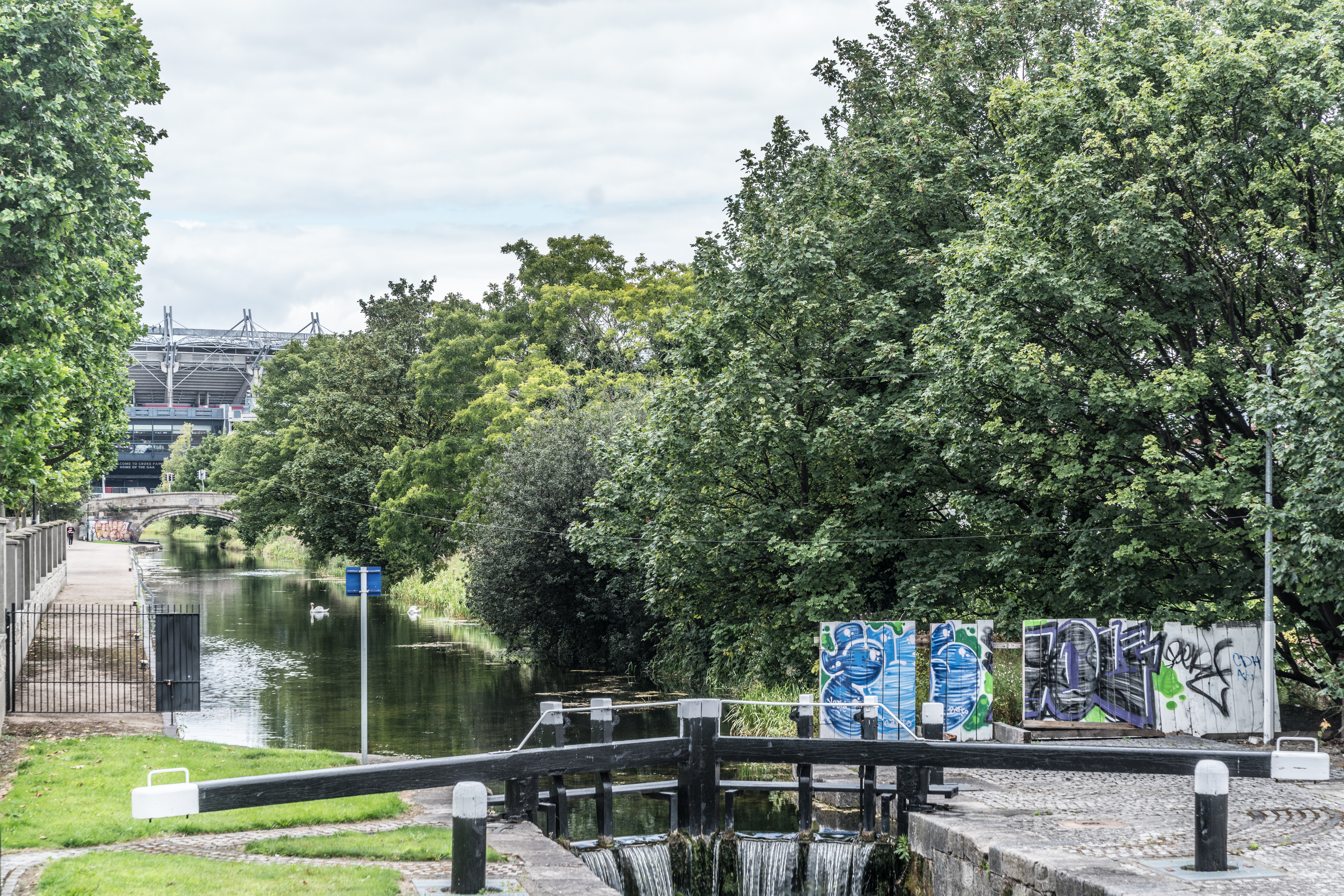
- A view along the Royal Canal from Newcomen Bridge with Croke Park in the distance

- Location in Dublin North Strand (Dublin)
- Coordinates: 53°21′30″N 6°14′27″W
- Country: Ireland
- Province: Leinster
- County: Dublin
- Local authority: Dublin City Council
- Elevation: 3 m (9.8 ft)
- Time zone: UTC+0 (WET)
  - Summer (DST): UTC-1 (IST (WEST))
- Eircode routing key: D01, D03

North Strand (Irish: An Trá Thuaidh) is a residential inner city neighbourhood on the Northside of Dublin, Ireland.

== Location and access ==
The area is physically bounded by the River Tolka to the north and the railway tracks to the east. North Strand is considered to extend to the Five Lamps junction to the south, and to neighbouring Ballybough to the northwest. It lies within two postal districts, Dublin 1 and Dublin 3.

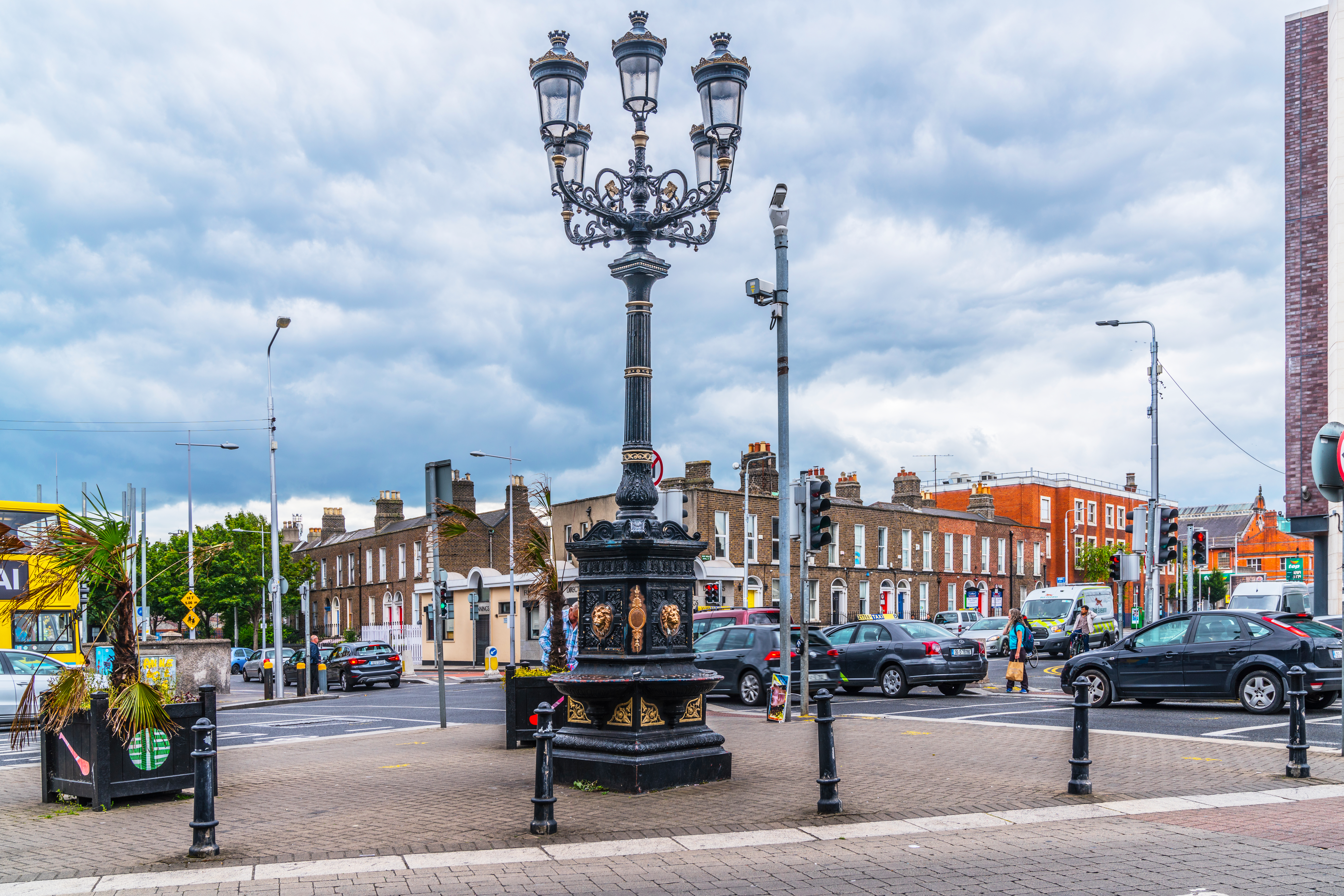
A five-headed streetlight known locally as "The Five Lamps" is a neighbourhood landmark

The area is bisected from the south-west to the northeast by the North Strand Road, which serves as a main arterial route for traffic to and from the city centre and Malahide, Howth and the M50. This road was at one time coastal, before the expansion of Dublin's docklands to the east. The East Wall was constructed to provide access to deeper water for ships, but it also enabled the reclamation of the land east of North Strand Road and the expansion of Dublin City to the northeast.

It is also bisected by the Royal Canal. The Royal Canal and the North Strand Road cross each other at Newcomen Bridge, which is the first lock on the canal. As shown in John Roque's map of Dublin in 1756, the development of the Royal Canal was complete in Dublin before any significant development occurred in North Strand. This 1836 map of Dublin, shows the North Strand / Ballybough area to be one of the first areas of Dublin City to extend beyond the canal boundaries.

== Amenities and facilities ==
Marino College of Further Education is on North Strand itself, near the Five Lamps. A memorial garden for the bombing of North Strand is located on the college grounds. On the same side of the road, a recycling centre is available on Shamrock Terrace.

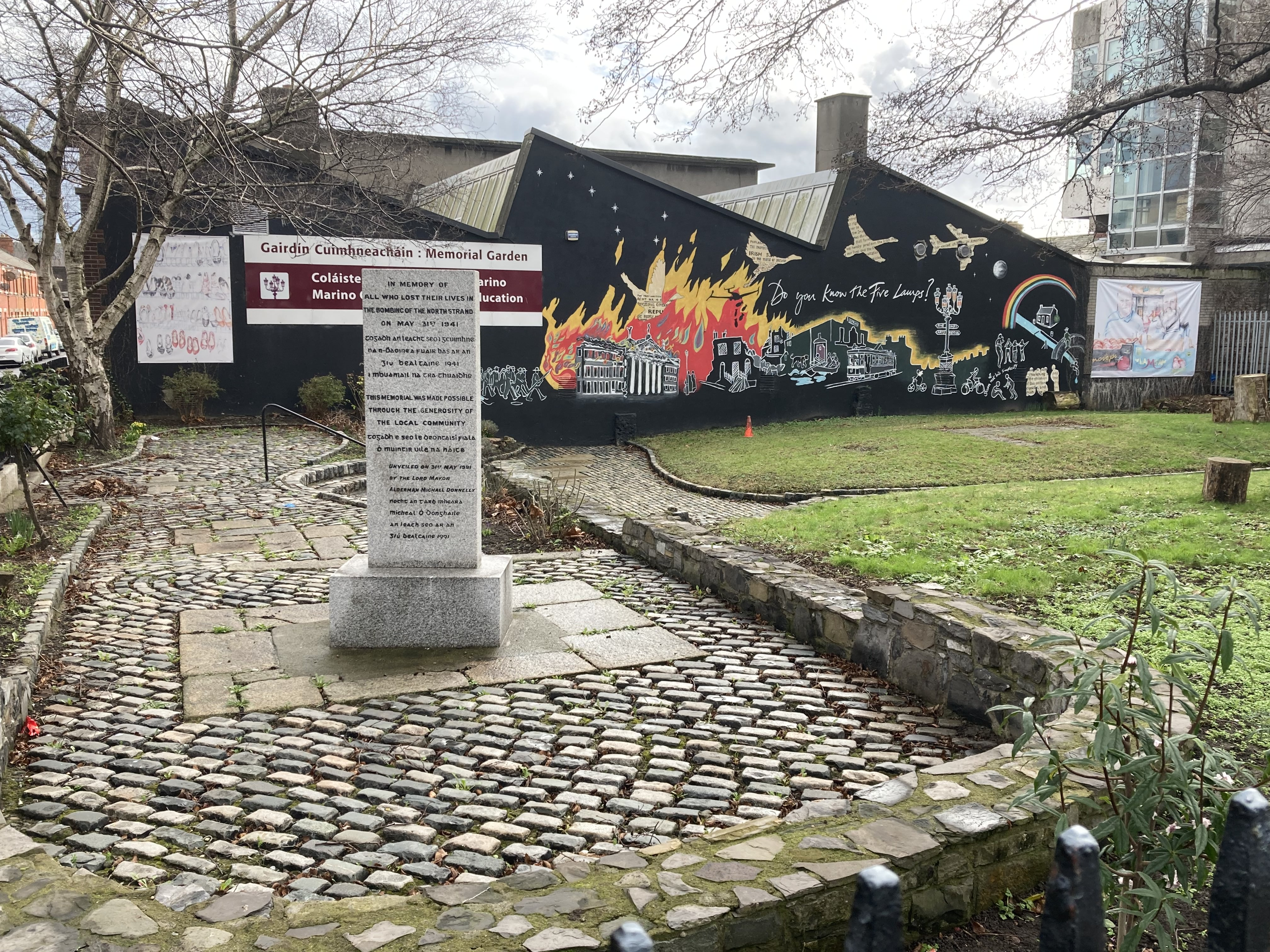
North Strand bombing memorial park

On the opposite side of North Strand is a HSE Health centre. Closer to the Royal Canal, Charleville Mall public library is just off the main road, and is located beside St Agatha's Catholic Church. A linear park also follows the Royal Canal to connect North Strand to the Docklands.

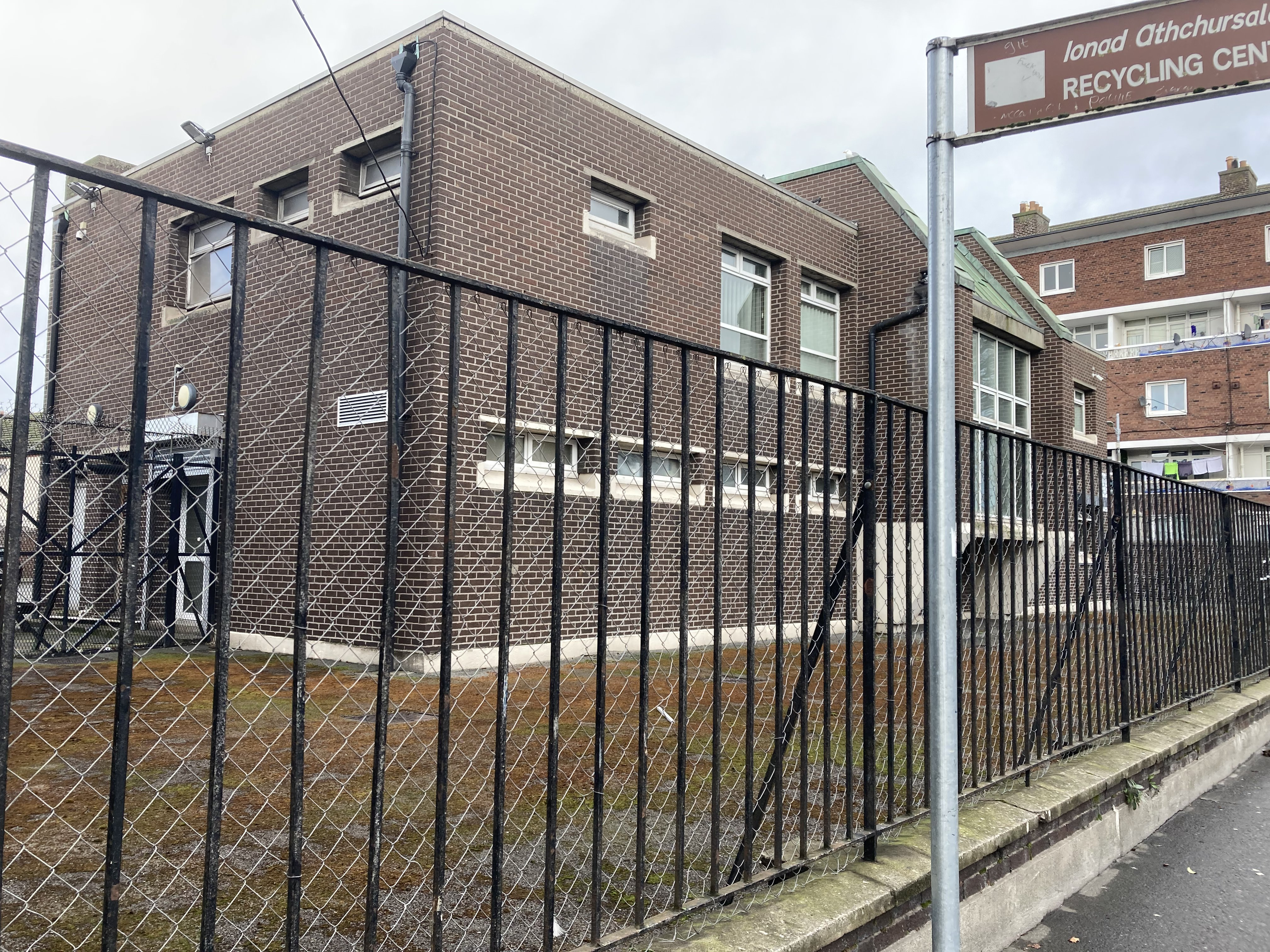
The health care center present in North Strand

On the north side of the canal, the historical Mud Island site is used as a community garden. Further North along the strand is North Strand Church and St. Columba's National School. Closer again to Fairview Park is a Dublin Fire Brigade fire station.

== History ==
=== North Strand Bombing ===
Perhaps the most infamous occurrence associated with the North Strand was "the North Strand Bombing". On the night of 31 May 1941, during the Second World War, German aircraft of the Luftwaffe bombed neutral Dublin. Four bombs were dropped in the vicinity of North Strand between 12:30 a.m. and 2:00 a.m. The fourth bomb was the largest and most destructive, landing 30 m (33 yd) south of Newcomen Bridge, directly in the centre of North Strand village, severely damaging the main street. A memorial park to the victims of the attack is now located near the Five Lamps.

=== 1954 floods ===
Following a country-wide storm in early December 1954, the River Tolka burst its banks and flooded parts of the North Strand. This followed heavy rainfall on 8 December 1954, coinciding with the spring tide on the morning of 9 December, which led to the collapse the Great National Railroads Bridge at East Wall Road. This acted as a dam, and forced the flood waters out into the neighbouring streets. In places, the flood water reached 4 feet, and resulted in the evacuation of 400 people, 50 by boat, and the death of two residents. Some basements and gardens recorded 8 to 10 feet of water. Three Army field kitchens were set up, with the Red Cross supplying hot meals and rations. 100 people unable to return to their homes were temporarily housed at Marlborough Street School, with a further 300 housed at St John Ambulance Brigade headquarters.

In the period after the floods, several events and other fundraising activities were organised to donate to the Lord Mayor’s Distress Fund in aid of the flood victims. Engineers from the Army cleared the bridge debris, and the fire service pumped out flooded houses. The houses were then fumigated by disinfectant teams. Building inspections were undertaken by the Dublin Corporation, which also dispensed free coal to those affected.

=== The Troubles ===
During the Official IRA-Irish National Liberation Army (INLA) feud the INLA leader Seamus Costello was shot dead with a shotgun as he sat in his car on Northbrook Avenue, off the North Strand Road in Dublin on 5 October 1977 allegedly by a member of the Official IRA, Jim Flynn, who happened to be in the area at the time. The Official and Provisional IRAs both denied responsibility and Sinn Féin/The Workers' Party issued a statement condemning the killing. Members of an opposing INLA faction in Belfast also denied the killing. However, the INLA eventually deemed Flynn the person responsible, and he was shot dead in June 1982 in the North Strand, Dublin, very close to the spot where Costello died.

== Points of note ==
The first milestone along the route from the GPO to Howth and Malahide is in North Strand at the corner of Bayview Avenue.

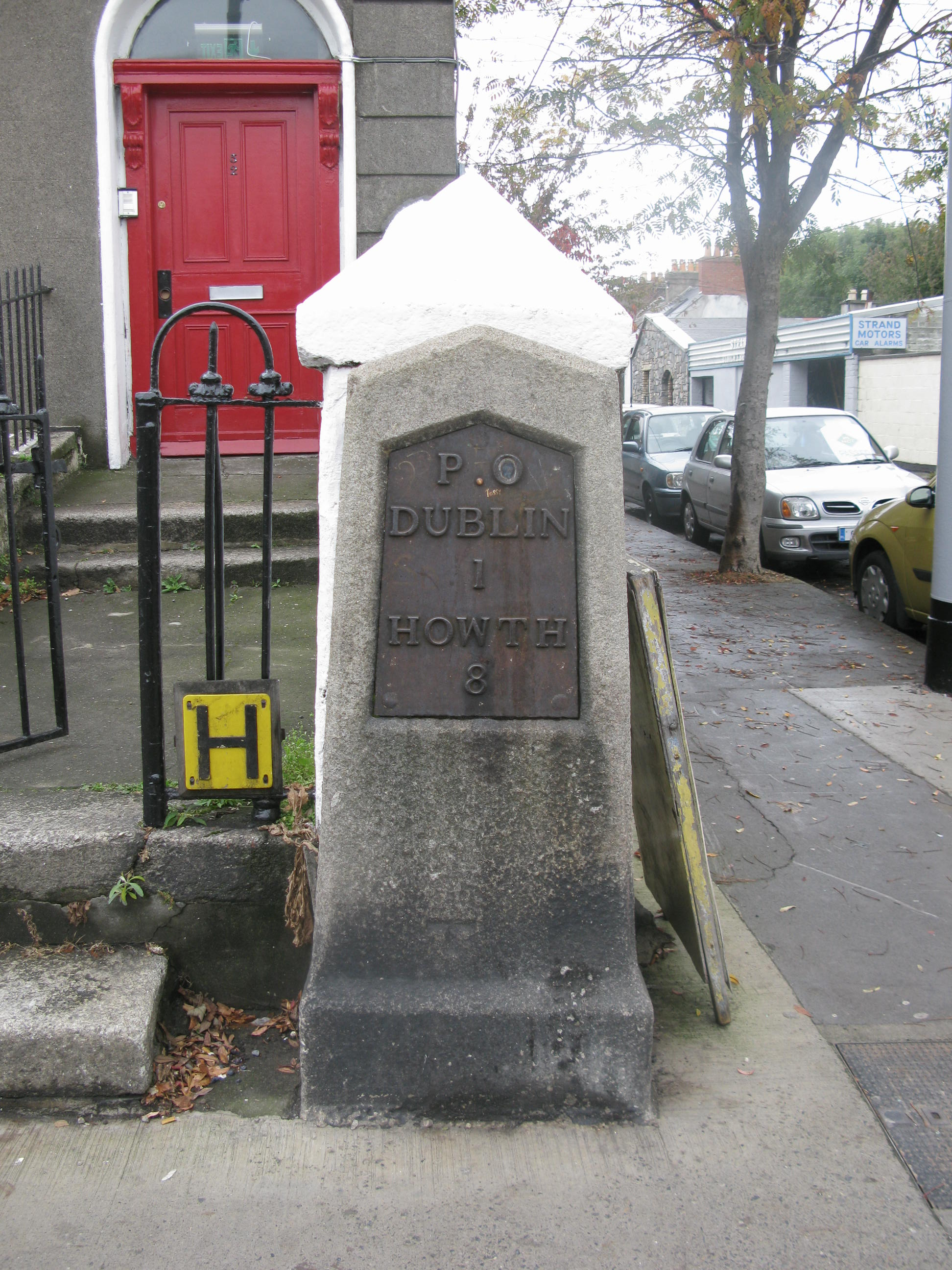
The 1 Mile from the GPO milestone in North Strand

The Strand Cinema, which originally opened at 149 North Strand Road in 1938. It later became a bingo hall, then a bowling alley. It was subsequently demolished in the 2000s, but its facade was preserved and it now serves as the entrance to an apartment building.

In September 2025, a mural painted by local artist Holly Pereira was unveiled by Dublin Lord Mayor Ray McAdam in North Strand. The project was championed by Social Democrats councillor Daniel Ennis and supported by local businesses.

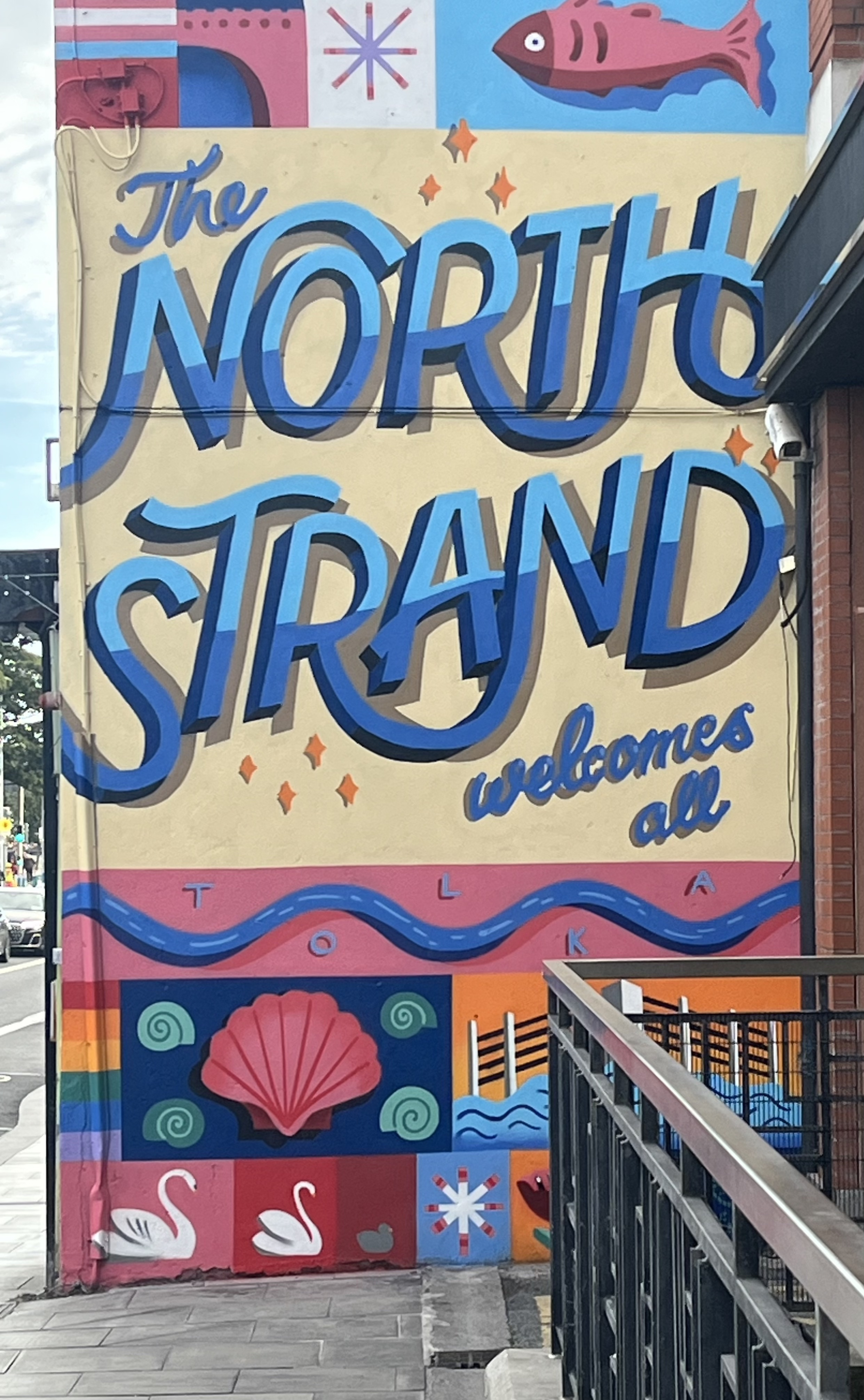
Holly Pereira's North Strand Welcomes All Mural
