= Eoghan Ó Ceannabháin =

Irish folk musician and political activist

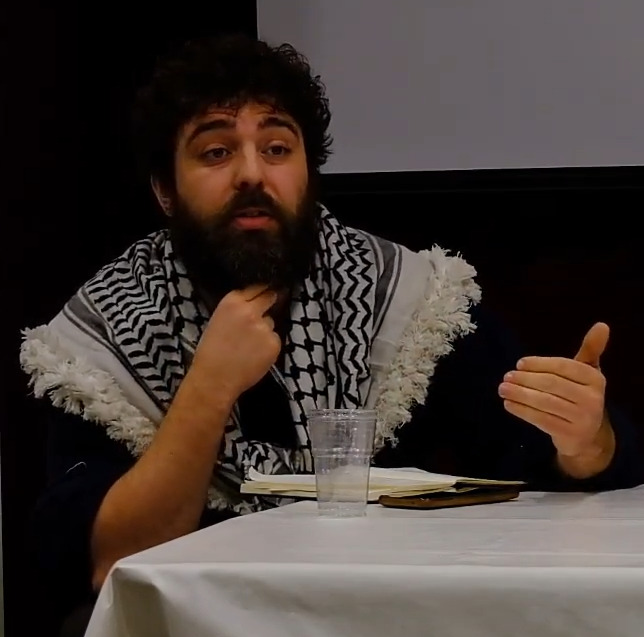
- Ó Ceannabháin in 2024
- Occupations: Folk musician, political activist
- Political party: People Before Profit

Eoghan Ó Ceannabháin is an Irish folk musician and political activist. He comes from the sean nós tradition of Connemara. He was raised in Dublin in an Irish-speaking household. His father was a sean nós singer, his mother a classical violinist, and he has two sisters who are both musicians and collaborators of his. His musical inspirations include Sorcha Ní Ghuairim, Seán 'ac Dhonncha, Nioclás Tóibín and Colm Ó Caoidheáin.

== Music career ==
Ó Ceannabháin collaborated with fiddler and viola player Ultan O'Brien with his first album Solas An Lae, released in 2021. In a review for The Irish Times, Síobhan Long wrote that Ó Ceannabháin had "already forged a formidable identity" with Solas An Lae, and that The Deepest Breath, its 2022 successor which she awarded four stars, comprised "remarkable songs". He is a member of Skipper's Alley, featuring John Francis Flynn.

Ó Ceannabháin has been recognised twice by the RTÉ Radio 1 Folk Awards, who awarded Solas an Lae Best Album in 2021, and Ó Ceannabháin Best Folk Singer in 2024.

== Political career ==
Ó Ceannabháin began to get involved in politics around 2015, initially focused on activism against racism and direct provision. He was among the main organisers of the campaign to save The Cobblestone pub, a hub of Irish traditional music that had been threatened with redevelopment in 2021.

Ó Ceannabháin is a member of People Before Profit and has contested general and local elections for the party. He stood in the 2020 general election in Dublin Rathdown, receiving 3.5% of the first-preference vote and was eliminated on the third count. In the 2024 Dublin City Council election, he stood in the North Inner City local electoral area, receiving 8.6% of the first-preference vote and was eliminated on the final count. At the 2024 general election he stood in the four-seat Dublin Central constituency, placed ninth in first preferences and was eliminated on the 5th count. He contested in the 2026 Dublin Central by-election, and was eliminated on the fourth count.

== Discography ==
- Solas An Lae (2021) - with Ultan O'Brien
- The Deepest Breath (2022)
