= Janet Horner =

Irish politician

Cllr Janet Horner
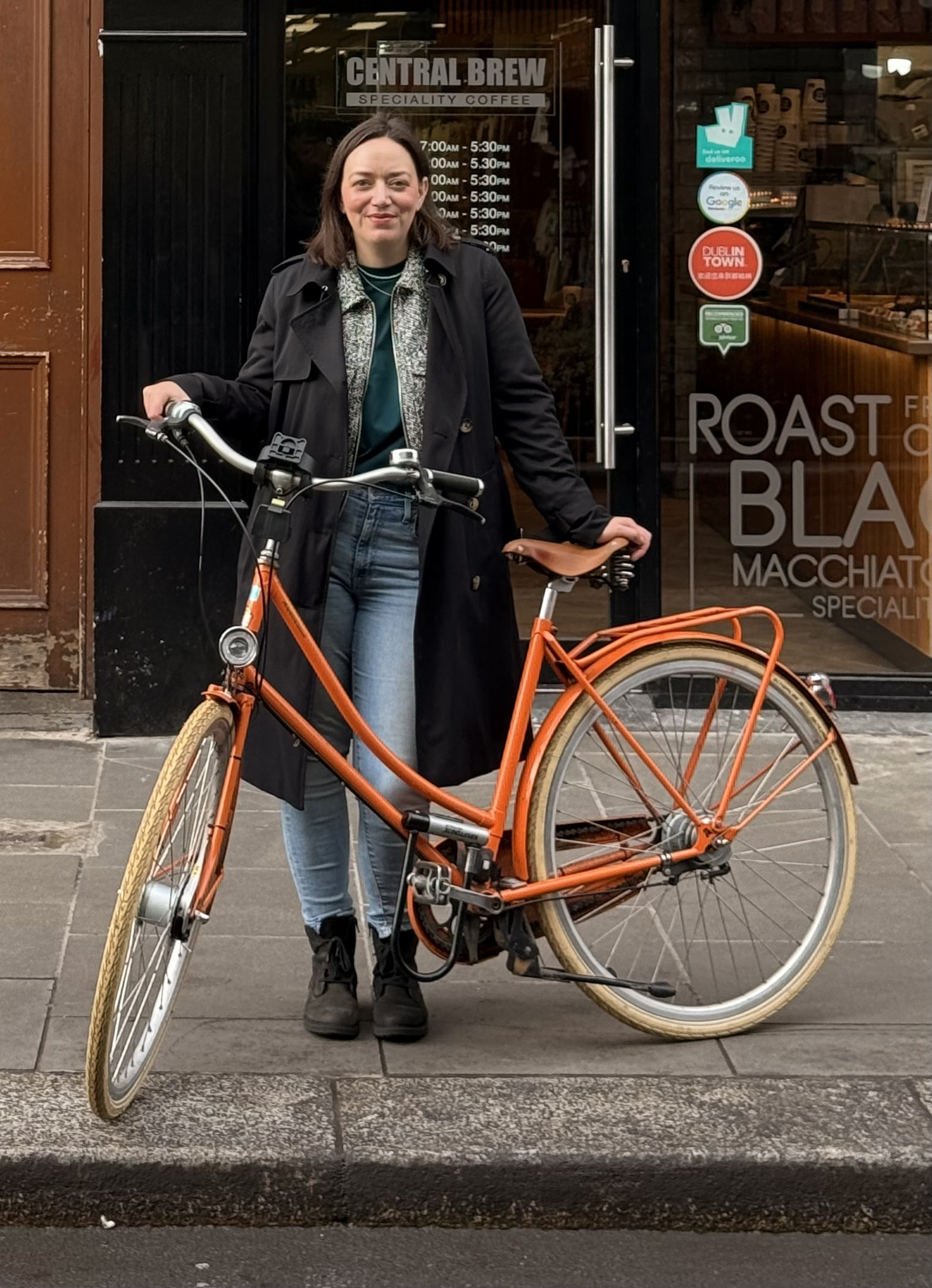
- Horner in 2025

Dublin City Councillor
- Incumbent
- Assumed office 2 September 2019
- Preceded by: Ciarán Cuffe
- Constituency: North Inner City

Chair of the Green Party
- Incumbent
- Assumed office 1 May 2025
- Preceded by: Pauline O'Reilly

Personal details
- Party: Green Party
- Website: janethorner.ie

Janet Horner is an Irish Green Party politician who has been a member of Dublin City Council since September 2019. She was elected chairperson of the party in May 2025, succeeding Pauline O'Reilly. She is the party's spokesperson on Foreign Affairs, Trade and Defence.

== Biography ==
Horner holds a Bachelor's degree in Anthropology and Development Studies and a Master's in Politics and Public Policy.

She has lived in the northern inner city of Dublin for over a decade, having previously lived in England, Uganda and India, working in politics, and on human rights and community development projects. She is a trade union activist and is a member of SIPTU's National Equality and Global Solidarity Committees.

Horner campaigned with Together for Yes in the 2018 referendum to remove the constitutional ban on abortion. She sits on the board of the Rotunda Hospital.

== Political career ==
Horner was co-opted to the Dublin City Council seat held by Ciarán Cuffe in September 2019 following Cuffe's election to the European Parliament the previous May. She was re-elected at the 2024 Dublin City Council election winning 9.5% of the first preference votes in the North Inner City local electoral area. During the 2024 election campaign, Horner was assaulted and received death threats while erecting posters on North Circular Road, Dublin.

In May 2025, she succeeded Pauline O'Reilly as chair of the Green Party. She contested the 2026 Dublin Central by-election, coming third with 11.7% of the vote.
