= Philip Sutcliffe Snr =

Irish politician and boxer (born 1959)

Cllr Philip Sutcliffe

Dublin City Councillor
- Incumbent
- Assumed office June 2024
- Constituency: Ballyfermot–Drimnagh

Personal details
- Born: 11 October 1959 (age 66)
- Party: Independent
- Other political affiliations: Independent Ireland (2024)

Philip Sutcliffe (born 10 November 1959) is an Irish politician, former boxer and two-time Olympian. He competed at the 1980 and 1984 Olympic Games. Additionally, he was the winner of four national titles in Ireland, two at bantamweight and one each at light flyweight and flyweight, as well as bronze medals in two successive European Amateur Boxing Championships, in Germany in 1977 and 1979.

His son Philip Sutcliffe Jnr is also a notable boxer.

Sutcliffe contested the local electoral areas of Ballyfermot–Drimnagh and Kimmage–Rathmines for Independent Ireland in the 2024 Dublin City Council election. He was elected for the Ballyfermot–Drimnagh area.

On 23 November 2024, Sutcliffe quit Independent Ireland after controversy arose over Sutcliffe's association with Conor McGregor following McGregor being found liable for assault and rape. Another issue was Sutcliffe's reported interest in meeting criminal Gerry "The Monk" Hutch. A general election candidate for Dublin South-Central, Sutcliffe faced criticism from party leadership, who deemed his actions and public statements inconsistent with their commitment to law and order. Richard O'Donoghue stated that Sutcliffe resigned before a second meeting with the party executive, where disciplinary measures were expected to be discussed. While acknowledging Sutcliffe’s contributions to boxing, O’Donoghue emphasised that the party could not condone his connections. Sutcliffe has not provided public comment on the matter.

In November 2025, following the 2025 Irish presidential election, Sutcliffe came under criticism after a spoiled ballot paper containing racist and homophobic remarks was shared on his social media accounts during the election. The ballot included slurs against several presidential candidates, such as calling Catherine Connolly "commie filth" and Heather Humphreys an "Ulster Loyalist", along with phrases such as "Deport all Africans!", "Deport All Indians!" and "Ban Same-Sex Adoption". Sutcliffe claimed the image had been "accidentally shared" after being tagged in it and said he had not realised it had appeared on his accounts. At a subsequent council meeting, Lord Mayor Ray McAdam read Sutcliffe’s written apology into the record. Sutcliffe stated that the image was not his ballot paper, condemned its content as "disgusting", and said he took full responsibility for the error. Sinn Féin councillor Daithí Doolan argued that Sutcliffe should have delivered the apology in person, noting the seriousness of the incident amid recent racist attacks in Dublin and Drogheda.

In May 2026, The Irish Times reported that Sutcliffe had shared a video on WhatsApp which called for a "real final solution" against Jewish people. The video features a voice over of Adolf Hitler at the start, then proceeding to blame Jewish people for a "degenerate" Hollywood, "white replacement", and pornography. Sutcliffe responded to inquiries by stating he "...probably didn’t even read it" and that he didn't endorse it.

== 1980 Olympic results ==
Below is the record of Philip Sutcliffe, an Irish bantamweight boxer who competed at the 1980 Moscow Olympics:

- Round of 64: bye
- Round of 32: lost to Daniel Zaragoza (Mexico) by decision, 0-5
