= Ellie Kisyombe =

Malawian chef and human rights activist based in Ireland

- Born: 11 September 1977 (age 49); Malawi
- Occupation: Activist
- Political party: Social Democrats (2019)

Ellida "Ellie" Tayanjana Kisyombe (born 11 September 1977) is a Malawian activist and asylum seeker living in Ireland. She is the co-founder of Our Table, a non-profit social enterprise that operates projects such as pop-up restaurants.

== Background ==
Ellie Kisyombe was born in Malawi and grew up in Lilongwe. Both of her parents were public servants, her mother in the Malawian treasury and her father was the head of Malawi's agricultural development body. Her father was a polygamist. She was involved in anti-corruption campaigns in Malawi, and her family are members of the opposition political party. Kisyombe believes that her father died by poisoning due to his political activities. After a series of crackdowns, she was advised to leave the country.

She travelled to Ireland on a student visa in 2010. She then travelled to the United Kingdom to apply for asylum there. After being arrested there, she claimed asylum in Ireland. She was placed in direct provision and was housed in the centre in Ballyhaunis, County Mayo. She was later diagnosed with depression. She has twin children, a son and a daughter, who joined her in Ireland. In July 2019, she was granted leave to remain in Ireland and subsequently took a trip back home to Malawi.

== Education ==
Kisyombe has given various accounts of her education. She claimed, in a 2019 interview with the Irish Times, that after her twins were born in Malawi (which was 2000 or early 2001), she was "dispatched to Johannesburg to finish her schooling". However, in interviews for the book 'Refugee Entrepreneurship: A Case-based Topography', which was published four months before the Irish Times article, she claimed to have been "sent to study at Bristol University in the UK, but did not graduate, having interrupted her studies following the death of her father in the early 2000s, and returned to Malawi.". Separately, The Sunday Times reported that, according to her official record with Irish authorities, she attended Bristol University between 2007 and 2010. In fact, both of these accounts transpired to be untrue. Bristol University stated, in response to a Freedom of Information request, that they have no record of her attendance at the university at any time. Kisyombe's LinkedIn page states that she holds a "Bachelor of Applied Science (B.A.Sc.) - Community Development 2016-2020" but without specifying any institution.

== Career ==
=== Activism ===
Kisyombe began her activism by volunteering with the Irish Refugee Council where she met café owner and Irish Examiner food columnist Michelle Darmody with whom she founded Our Table, initially catering events at venues such as the Irish Museum of Modern Art. They held a pop-up café in the Project Arts Centre in 2016, first as a two-day event which was extended to three-months. The project highlights the lack of facilities for food preparation in direct provision centres and advocates for the ending of the direct provision system. After this, Kisyombe was invited by Darina Allen to undertake a three-month internship at Ballymaloe Cookery School. She is now the volunteer director of the company. Our Table have supplied a line of hot sauces, sold by The Good Food Store, and Kisyombe runs a food stall in Dublin since January 2018 with hopes of opening a kitchen that would serve as a training space.

Alongside Sinéad Burke, Eileen Flynn, and Mari Kennedy, Kisyombe was on a panel hosted by Miriam O'Callaghan at Electric Picnic in 2017 for The Women's Podcast. She is also active in the Movement of Asylum Seekers in Ireland, and has spoken out about her experiences of racism in Ireland. She appeared in Hozier's Nina Cried Power video with other activists.

=== Social Democrat candidacy ===
In 2019, Kisyombe ran as a candidate in the 2019 Irish local elections with the Social Democrats in the Dublin City local electoral area of North Inner City. She was the first person living in direct provision to run in local elections. She came under scrutiny when The Sunday Times wrote about the discrepancies between her version of her asylum applications and the official records. In particular, this centred around how Kisyombe omitted her asylum application in the United Kingdom in 2014 and other discrepancies in the time line of her asylum applications. This led to the resignation of a number of party members. The party conducted an independent review, and she was allowed to continue her election campaign. Kisyombe claimed that the incident had hurt her campaign.

== Assault charge ==
On 23 March 2022, Kisyombe was charged with the February 21, 2019 assault of a female worker at a reception centre in north Dublin where she lived for a period while she was an asylum seeker. The case was adjourned until 7 September 2022, for a hearing in Blanchardstown, Dublin. In March 2023 it was announced that Kisyombe would be accepting an adult caution in relation to the case, though she later reversed the decision to accept an adult caution and pleaded 'not guilty'. The case was ultimately struck out.
