= Malachy Steenson =

Irish far-right politician and activist

Dublin City Councillor
- Incumbent
- Assumed office June 2024
- Constituency: North Inner City

Personal details
- Born: 1962 or 1963 (age 62–63) Dublin, Ireland
- Party: Independent (since 2012); Workers' Party (before 2012)
- Other political affiliations: Irish Republican Socialist Party; Republican Sinn Fein; 32 County Sovereignty Movement

Malachy Steenson (born 1962 or 1963) is an Irish far-right politician who was elected to Dublin City Council for the local electoral area of North Inner City at the 2024 local elections. He runs a general law practice, specialising in family law.

In the 1990s and 2000s, Steenson was associated with numerous left-wing Irish Republican groups, during which time he received three criminal convictions, including one from the Special Criminal Court for stealing a car. However, by 2012, Steenson began to be associated with more rightward political positions. He was expelled sometime prior to 2012 from the Workers' Party for espousing a hardline pro-life stance on abortion.

In the 2020s, Steenson became a high-profile figure in the Irish anti-immigration protests in Dublin, was elected to Dublin City Council in 2024 and subsequently stood unsuccessfully in general and European elections.

== Activism, criminal convictions and political career ==
=== Early activism: republicanism, anti-abortion, drug-related activism and criminal convictions ===
Steenson was previously active in a number of republican groups, including Republican Sinn Féin, 32 County Sovereignty Movement, the Irish Republican Socialist Party (IRSP), and was associated with the family of the murdered Real IRA leader Alan Ryan.

In 1992, Steenson campaigned for a "No" vote in the November 1992 abortion referendum. During the campaign, Steenson displayed graphic posters provided by the ultra-conservative Youth Defence organisation in a shop he owned.

Steenson has multiple criminal convictions from the 1990s, among them three convictions for unlawful possession of an illegal weapon, giving a false address to Gardaí, and a conviction by the Special Criminal Court for unauthorised taking of a vehicle, in the course of his republican activities, for which he received a three-year suspended sentence. His home was subject to a raid by the Special Branch in 1994. He was denied a licence to drive a hackney cab in 1998 due to his convictions.

Although active in anti-drug movements during the decade, he opposed a march of concerned parents on Brendan ‘Fats’ Reilly, defending Reilly as an addict but not a dealer; Reilly was subsequently convicted of possession of £30,000 worth of heroin.

In 2006 he was one of the objectors to the re-opening of a pub on the site of the Stardust fire, in which his in-laws died.

=== Workers' Party ===
He stood for election for the far-left Workers' Party in the 2009 Dublin Central by-election, served as a party spokesman in the 2010 budget protests, and ran as their candidate in Dublin Central in the 2011 general election, before being expelled for attending a pro-life rally after a series of disputes with party leadership. In 2024, a faction of the splintered Workers' Party publicly criticised his praise for Official IRA member Jim Flynn, stating Flynn's former comrades would not appreciate Steenson's attempt at associating himself with Flynn.

=== Independent activism ===
Steenson participated in the 2010 Claiming Our Future citizen's forum where he called for a referendum on the country's economic policy, "so that government can not again construct state policy merely for the benefit of bankers and speculators". He was a prominent campaigner against the children's rights referendum, which was approved in 2012, which he characterised as an attack on parents. Steenson served as general secretary of the Association of Combined Residents Associations (ACRA), which opposed water charges.

=== Far-right activism ===
In a 2021 interview with the conservative student paper The Burkean, Steenson stated

I know this term becomes very loaded but with population replacement, the vast majority of those people, of the 'new Irish', won’t have any loyalty to the Irish Nation, they might have a loyalty to the State but they won’t have any concept within themselves, and this is no fault of theirs, but their allegiance within themselves is to their original country. And they will have a vote because they’ve all been given citizenship.

Beginning in 2022, Steenson began organising protests for far-right and anti-immigration causes. Steenson was a guest speaker at the Irish Freedom Party's annual conference in 2022. During his speaking time, Steenson criticised the Gardaí for supporting Gay Pride events and praised Donald Trump for appointing Supreme Court judges who overturned Roe v. Wade, which legislates for abortion in the United States.

=== Election as councillor, Dáil and European runs ===
Steenson was elected at the 2024 Dublin City Council election as an independent candidate with support from National Party candidates. During his candidacy, a man was arrested following a public order incident at Steenson's office. Steenson, who was not present at the time of the incident, described it as an "assassination attempt". The man subsequently pleaded guilty and was jailed for 13 months. Steenson also ran in the Dublin constituency for the European elections, where he received 7,128 (1.9%) first preference votes, and was eliminated from the field of 23 candidates on the 12th count.

Steenson ran for election in the Dublin Central constituency of the 2024 Irish general election as an independent endorsed by the far-right National Alliance. He was eliminated on the sixth count. In November 2025, Steenson announced his intention to contest the 2026 Dublin Central by-election. He was not elected, being eliminated on the fifth count.
