= 2026 Dublin Central by-election =

By-election to the 34th Dáil

- 22 May 2026
- Turnout: 43.5% ▼8.8 pp
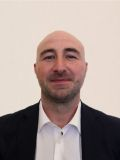

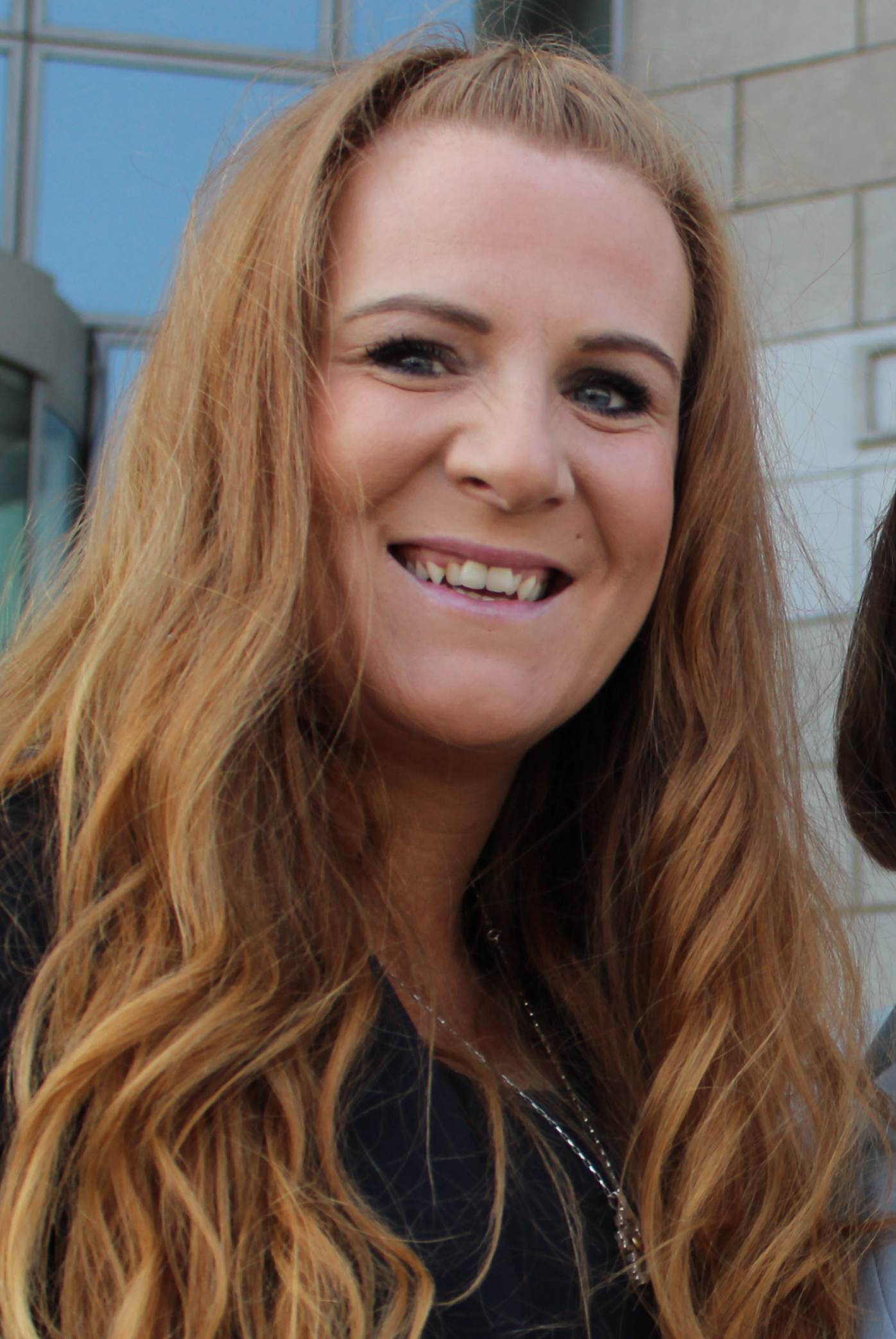

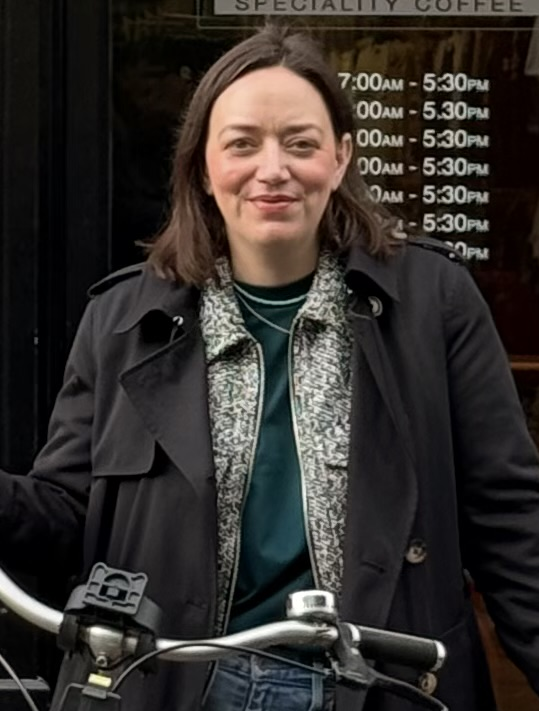
Nominee	Daniel Ennis	Janice Boylan	Janet Horner
Party	Social Democrats	Sinn Féin	Green
First preferences	4,903	4,348	2,907
Percentage	19.7%	17.5%	11.7%
Final count	12,050	7,787	–
- The winner by electoral division using tally data
TD before election
Paschal Donohoe
Fine Gael
TD after election
Daniel Ennis
Social Democrats

A Dáil by-election was held in the constituency of Dublin Central in Ireland on 22 May 2026, to fill the vacancy in the 34th Dáil left by the resignation of Fine Gael Teachta Dála (TD) Paschal Donohoe on 21 November 2025. It was held on the same as the 2026 Galway West by-election.

The by-election was won by Daniel Ennis of the Social Democrats, leading to the party having two TDs in the same constituency for the first time in their history. The by-election was also marked by Fianna Fáil's worst by-election performance ever, surpassing the poor performance the party had in the 2021 Dublin Bay South by-election.

== Timing ==
Under the Electoral (Amendment) Act 2011, the writ of election for the by-election must be issued within six months of the vacancy. The writ to fill the vacancy was agreed by the Dáil on 22 April. On the following day, the Minister for Housing, Local Government and Heritage set the election date for 22 May.

== Constituency profile ==
The Dáil constituency of Dublin Central elects four TDs. Dublin Central is regarded as one of the most social and ethnically diverse constituencies in Ireland. In 2020, the constituency's population was 65.7% Irish, versus 87% for the country as a whole. The constituency consists of largely traditional working class areas such as East Wall, North Strand, Summerhill, Ballybough, Sheriff Street and Cabra with more suburban middle class Stoneybatter, Phibsborough, Glasnevin and Lower Drumcondra on the northern fringes of the constituency. It contains O'Connell Street, the Four Courts and the IFSC. Dublin Central was the location of the 2023 Dublin riot, and anti-immigration candidates have a presence here. At the 2024 general election, Dublin Central elected one Sinn Féin, one Social Democrat, one Fine Gael and one Labour TD.

== Candidates ==
On 19 November 2025, independent Dublin City councillor Malachy Steenson confirmed his intention to stand. Alleged crime boss Gerry Hutch confirmed his intention to stand on 23 November 2025. Musician and activist Eoghan Ó Ceannabháin was announced as the candidate for People Before Profit on 10 December 2025. On 16 December 2025, councillor Daniel Ennis was selected as the Social Democrats candidate.

Aontú announced Ian Noel Smyth as their candidate on 15 January 2026. On 4 February 2026, the Green Party announced that the party's Cathaoirleach, Dublin City Councillor Janet Horner would be the party's candidate in the by-election. On 25 February, Sinn Féin councillor Janice Boylan, who was Mary Lou McDonald's running mate in Dublin Central at the 2024 general election, was chosen as the party's candidate at a selection convention. In February 2026, Colm Flood, a former People Before Profit member announced that he would run as an independent candidate.

On 2 March 2026, Ruth O'Dea was selected as the Labour Party candidate. On 23 March 2026, councillor Ray McAdam, the current Lord Mayor of Dublin was announced as the Fine Gael candidate. On 30 March 2026, councillor John Stephens was selected as the Fianna Fáil candidate.

== Campaign ==
In online comments on 3 May, Gerry Hutch said undocumented immigrants, including Somalis, should be "interned" in the Curragh Camp rather than housed in hotels or given state payments. He claimed immigrants were coming to Ireland from Britain and France "because it's a freebie and they're getting paid". Hutch appeared to single out Somali migrants in particular, saying they were in Ireland illegally and should "be put back on the boat". He later rejected accusations of racism, saying he had friends of different racial backgrounds and insisted he was "certainly not racist".

On 13 May, while canvassing on behalf of Fianna Fáil for the by-election, former Taoiseach Bertie Ahern was secretly filmed during a conversation about immigration in which he said that "the ones I worry about are the Africans", that he has concerns about the level of immigration, and that Ireland "can't be taking in people" coming from "the Congo". He also singled out people from "the next generation of Muslims". The Green Party candidate in the by-election, Janet Horner, described the comments as "not only harmful, but hurtful to the people who live in the constituency he once represented. They are untrue and ill-informed", while Labour leader, Ivana Bacik, called for a full apology. Ahern later stood over the views expressed but added that he was wrong to single out a particular group of people.

On 19 May, A few days after Ahern's comments were reported in the media, a Congolese man, Yves Sakila, died while being restrained by private security guards on Henry Street, part of the Dublin Central consitutency. Sakila's death was linked to Ahern's comments by Social Democrats TD, Gary Gannon and by People Before Profit by-election candidate Eoghan Ó Ceannabháin. Separately, Donnah Vuma, a Social Democrat candidate in the 2024 Limerick City and County Council election who works for the migrant rights organisation Doras, said that she would "refuse to be silent about the connection between [Bertie Ahern's] rhetoric and what happened to Yves Sakila", claiming that "Anti-Black racism runs through assumptions, institutions, and the mouths of respected elder statesmen who face no real consequence for what they say".

Research by Hope and Courage Collective published in the weeks after the election found that both Janice Boylan and Daniel Ennis were primary targets of sustained harmful online activity which sought to damage their reputations. Boylan faced misogynistic attacks immediately upon announcing her candidacy.

== Debates ==
RTÉ were forced to defend not inviting Gerry Hutch to the first television debate on 3 May 2026 saying that parties that won seats in the constituency in the last general election would receive preference. This meant that only Sinn Féin, Social Democrats, Fine Gael and Fianna Fáil were represented at the debate. Hutch was subsequently invited to attend a debate on RTÉ News: Six One on 15 May 2026 but declined, claiming that RTÉ had "snubbed" his previous campaign in the general election. Green Party candidate, Janet Horner was invited in his place. Also on 15 May, RTÉ Radio 1's Today with David McCullagh held two separate debates with four participants in each debate. It also provided the opportunity for lower polling candidates to provide a short audio clip outlining their election platform. The Six One debate was also split into two separate debates, the first with Boylan, Ennis and McAdam, and the second with Horner, O'Dea and Stephens.

2026 Dublin Central by-election debates
Date	Broadcaster	Moderator	Programme	Participants													
P Participant A Absent invitee – Not invited				Boylan	Corrigan	Ennis	Flynn	Flood	Horner	Hutch	McAdam	Ó Ceannabháin	O'Dea	O'Leary	Smyth	Steenson	Stephens
3 May	RTÉ One	Sarah McInerney	The Week in Politics	P	–	P	–	–	–	–	P	–	P	–	–	–	–
15 May	RTÉ Radio 1	David McCullagh	Today with David McCullagh	P	–	–	–	–	–	–	P	P	P	–	–	–	–
15 May	RTÉ Radio 1	David McCullagh	Today with David McCullagh	–	–	P	–	–	P	–	–	–	–	–	–	P	P
15 May	RTÉ One	Sharon Tobin	RTÉ News: Six One	P	–	P	–	–	–	–	P	–	–	–	–	–	–
15 May	RTÉ One	Sharon Tobin	RTÉ News: Six One	–	–	–	–	–	P	A	–	–	P	–	–	–	P

== Opinion polling ==
Last date of polling	Commissioner	Polling firm	Sample size	Sources	Boylan	Corrigan	Ennis	Flynn	Flood	Horner	Hutch	McAdam	Ó Ceannabháin	O'Dea	O'Leary	Smyth	Steenson	Stephens
14 May 2026	TG4; The Irish Times	Ipsos B&A	659		21	1	18	1	1	8	14	13	3	6	1	1	7	4

== Result ==
2026 Dublin Central by-election
Party	Candidate	FPv%	Count								
Party	Candidate	FPv%	1	2	3	4	5	6	7	8	9
Social Democrats	Daniel Ennis	19.7	4,903	4,954	5,049	5,512	6,383	6,509	7,681	8,306	12,050
Sinn Féin	Janice Boylan	17.5	4,348	4,416	4,484	4,587	5,017	5,373	5,569	7,210	7,787
Green	Janet Horner	11.7	2,907	2,958	3,052	3,632	4,010	4,058	5,272	5,452	
Independent	Gerry Hutch	11.3	2,817	2,872	2,907	2,923	2,959	4,349	4,466		
Fine Gael	Ray McAdam	10.7	2,659	2,724	3,277	3,475	3,500	3,614			
Independent	Malachy Steenson	9.4	2,342	2,542	2,596	2,614	2,641				
PBP–Solidarity	Eoghan Ó Ceannabháin	6.8	1,681	1,719	1,744	1,853					
Labour	Ruth O'Dea	5.8	1,454	1,481	1,568						
Fianna Fáil	John Stephens	4.2	1,049	1,120							
Aontú	Ian Noel Smyth	2.0	505								
Independent	Mannix Flynn	0.6	157								
Independent	Tony Corrigan	0.1	30								
Independent	Colm Flood	0.0	10								
Independent	John O'Leary	0.0	7								
Electorate: 57,619 Valid: 24,869 Spoilt: 176 Quota: 12,435 Turnout: 25,045 (43.5%)

The by-election was won by Daniel Ennis of the Social Democrats, the first time the party has had two TDs in the same constituency.

The Times characterised the Dublin Central by-election as a significant victory for Daniel Ennis and the Social Democrats, driven by strong performances in gentrifying parts of the constituency such as Glasnevin, Stoneybatter and Grangegorman, while Sinn Féin's Janice Boylan faced pressure both from Ennis and from independent candidates Gerard Hutch and Malachy Steenson in parts of the inner city. The Green Party's candidate, Janet Horner, regained much of the vote share, and the transfer-friendliness, that had been lost in the 2024 general election. The Times stated that transfer patterns were expected to favour Ennis through support from Green and Labour voters, while Hutch's transfers were seen as more likely to benefit Boylan, although Hutch's candidacy did not generate the scale of new turnout some observers anticipated.

The Times also described disappointing results for Fianna Fáil and Fine Gael, with both parties attributing weak performances partly to the difficulties of incumbency and organisational weaknesses, while commentators at the count highlighted widening class and political divisions across Dublin Central. It was Fianna Fáil's worst by-election performance ever, surpassing the poor performance the party had in the 2021 Dublin Bay South by-election.
