= Jen Cummins =

Irish politician (born 1974/75)

Jen Cummins TD
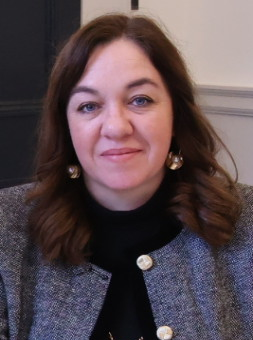
- Cummins in 2024

Teachta Dála
- Incumbent
- Assumed office November 2024
- Constituency: Dublin South-Central

Personal details
- Born: 1974 or 1975 (age 50–51)
- Party: Social Democrats
- Spouse: Dietmar Weiss
- Children: 4
- Education: Maynooth University; Trinity College Dublin; Dublin City University

Jen Cummins (born 1974/1975) is an Irish Social Democrats politician who has been a Teachta Dála (TD) for the Dublin South-Central constituency since the 2024 general election.

Cummins was previously a member of Dublin City Council, having been elected in June at the 2024 local elections for the South West Inner City electoral area.

== Early life and education ==
Cummins earned a Doctorate in Education from Dublin City University, focusing her research on the experiences of young people who left mainstream education before completing the Leaving Certificate. She also graduated from Maynooth University and Trinity College Dublin.

== Career in education and youth work ==
Cummins has a background in youth and educational services. She served as the Coordinator of the Ballymun Anseo School Completion Programme from its inception in 2007. Additionally, Cummins also lectured in ethics on the Bachelor of Education course at DCU. Cummins was also Chairperson of the Board of Directors of Educate Together for several years.

== Political career ==
In June 2024, Cummins was elected to Dublin City Council, representing the South West Inner City electoral area. Cummins was elected as a TD for the Dublin South-Central constituency at the 2024 general election for the Social Democrats. She serves as the Party's spokesperson for Education; and Further and Higher Education, Research Innovation, and Science.

== Personal life ==
Cummins lives in the Liberties with her husband, Dietmar Weiss, and their four children.

| Dáil | Election | Deputy (Party) | Deputy (Party) | Deputy (Party) | Deputy (Party) | Deputy (Party) |
|---|---|---|---|---|---|---|
| 13th | 1948 | Seán Lemass (FF) | James Larkin Jnr (Lab) | Con Lehane (CnaP) | Maurice E. Dockrell (FG) | John McCann (FF) |
| 14th | 1951 | Seán Lemass (FF) | James Larkin Jnr (Lab) | Philip Brady (FF) | Maurice E. Dockrell (FG) | John McCann (FF) |
| 15th | 1954 | Seán Lemass (FF) | James Larkin Jnr (Lab) | Thomas Finlay (FG) | Maurice E. Dockrell (FG) | Celia Lynch (FF) |
| 16th | 1957 | Seán Lemass (FF) | Jack Murphy (Ind.) | Philip Brady (FF) | Maurice E. Dockrell (FG) | Celia Lynch (FF) |
| 16th | 1958 by-election | Seán Lemass (FF) | Patrick Cummins (FF) | Philip Brady (FF) | Maurice E. Dockrell (FG) | Celia Lynch (FF) |
| 17th | 1961 | Seán Lemass (FF) | Patrick Cummins (FF) | Philip Brady (FF) | Maurice E. Dockrell (FG) | Joseph Barron (CnaP) |
| 18th | 1965 | Seán Lemass (FF) | Frank Cluskey (Lab) | Philip Brady (FF) | Maurice E. Dockrell (FG) | Thomas J. Fitzpatrick (FF) |
| 19th | 1969 | Richie Ryan (FG) | Ben Briscoe (FF) | Philip Brady (FF) | John O'Donovan (Lab) | 4 seats 1969–1977 |
| 20th | 1973 | Richie Ryan (FG) | Ben Briscoe (FF) | Philip Brady (FF) | John Kelly (FG) | 4 seats 1969–1977 |
| 21st | 1977 | Fergus O'Brien (FG) | Frank Cluskey (Lab) | Thomas J. Fitzpatrick (FF) | 3 seats 1977–1981 | |
| 22nd | 1981 | Fergus O'Brien (FG) | Ben Briscoe (FF) | Thomas J. Fitzpatrick (FF) | Gay Mitchell (FG) | John O'Connell (Note: O'Connell served as Ceann Comhairle in the 22nd and 23rd Dáil from 1981 to 1983 and was returned automatically at the February 1982 and November 1982 general elections. He joined Fianna Fáil in January 1985.) (Ind.) |
| 23rd | 1982 (Feb) | Frank Cluskey (Lab) | Ben Briscoe (FF) | Thomas J. Fitzpatrick (FF) | Gay Mitchell (FG) | John O'Connell (Ind.) |
| 24th | 1982 (Nov) | Frank Cluskey (Lab) | Ben Briscoe (FF) | Fergus O'Brien (FG) | Gay Mitchell (FG) | John O'Connell (Ind.) |
| 25th | 1987 | Frank Cluskey (Lab) | Ben Briscoe (FF) | Fergus O'Brien (FG) | Gay Mitchell (FG) | Mary Mooney (FF) |
| 26th | 1989 | John O'Connell (FF) | Ben Briscoe (FF) | Fergus O'Brien (FG) | Gay Mitchell (FG) | Eric Byrne (WP) |
| 27th | 1992 | John O'Connell (FF) | Ben Briscoe (FF) | Pat Upton (Lab) | Gay Mitchell (FG) | 4 seats 1992–2002 |
| 27th | 1994 by-election | Eric Byrne (DL) | Ben Briscoe (FF) | Pat Upton (Lab) | Gay Mitchell (FG) | 4 seats 1992–2002 |
| 28th | 1997 | Seán Ardagh (FF) | Ben Briscoe (FF) | Pat Upton (Lab) | Gay Mitchell (FG) | 4 seats 1992–2002 |
| 28th | 1999 by-election | Seán Ardagh (FF) | Ben Briscoe (FF) | Mary Upton (Lab) | Gay Mitchell (FG) | 4 seats 1992–2002 |
| 29th | 2002 | Seán Ardagh (FF) | Aengus Ó Snodaigh (SF) | Mary Upton (Lab) | Gay Mitchell (FG) | Michael Mulcahy (FF) |
| 30th | 2007 | Seán Ardagh (FF) | Aengus Ó Snodaigh (SF) | Mary Upton (Lab) | Catherine Byrne (FG) | Michael Mulcahy (FF) |
| 31st | 2011 | Eric Byrne (Lab) | Aengus Ó Snodaigh (SF) | Joan Collins (PBP) | Catherine Byrne (FG) | Michael Conaghan (Lab) |
| 32nd | 2016 | Bríd Smith (AAA–PBP) | Aengus Ó Snodaigh (SF) | Joan Collins (Note: Founded Right to Change in May 2020.) (I4C) | Catherine Byrne (FG) | 4 seats from 2016 |
| 33rd | 2020 | Bríd Smith (S–PBP) | Aengus Ó Snodaigh (SF) | Joan Collins (I4C) | Patrick Costello (GP) | 4 seats from 2016 |
| 34th | 2024 | Catherine Ardagh (FF) | Aengus Ó Snodaigh (SF) | Máire Devine (SF) | Jen Cummins (SD) | 4 seats from 2016 |
