= Daniel Ennis =

Irish politician

Daniel Ennis TD
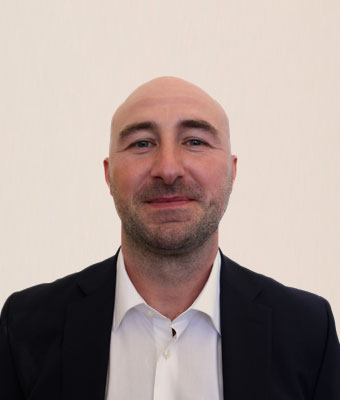
- Ennis in 2026

Teachta Dála
- Incumbent
- Assumed office 26 May 2026
- Constituency: Dublin Central

Dublin City Councillor
- In office June 2024 – May 2026
- Constituency: North Inner City

Personal details
- Born: 1988 or 1989 (age 37–38) North Strand, Dublin, Ireland
- Party: Social Democrats

Daniel Ennis (born 1988/1989) is an Irish politician and community activist who has served as a Teachta Dála (TD) for the Dublin Central constituency since the 2026 Dublin Central by-election. He served as a Dublin City Councillor for the North Inner City LEA from 2024 to 2026. A member of the Social Democrats, Ennis was previously a professional football player, playing a number of seasons in the League of Ireland.

== Early life ==
Ennis was born and raised on the North Strand in Dublin's north inner city. He was elected to Dublin City Council in June 2024 at the age of 35.

== Football career ==
Before entering politics, Ennis played League of Ireland football with Bohemians, Shelbourne, and Bray Wanderers.

== Community work ==
Ennis serves as vice-chairman of East Wall Bessborough FC, a community football club founded by his father, Geoff Ennis Snr., for at-risk youths and people struggling with addiction. Following his father's death in 2016, Ennis took over running the club.

Ennis has campaigned for improved sports facilities in the North Inner City, working with Belvedere FC on a partnership to develop a sports complex at Alfie Byrne Park in Fairview. In November 2025, the Alfie Byrne Road complex was granted a 99-year lease by Dublin City Council.

== Political career ==
Ennis served as constituency manager for Social Democrats TD Gary Gannon. He was elected at the 2024 Dublin City Council election for the North Inner City local electoral area. Following his election, Ennis was proposed as Lord Mayor of Dublin by an alliance on Dublin City Council of the Social Democrats, Sinn Féin, People Before Profit, and several independent councillors, though his nomination was ultimately unsuccessful.

In December 2025, Ennis was selected as the Social Democrats candidate for the 2026 Dublin Central by-election triggered by the resignation of Fine Gael TD Paschal Donohoe, following the latter's appointment to a senior role at the World Bank. Ennis won the by-election, becoming a TD for Dublin Central.

== Personal life ==
Ennis lives on the North Strand with his fiancée Chloe and their two children.

Dáil	Election	Deputy (Party)	Deputy (Party)	Deputy (Party)	Deputy (Party)
19th	1969	Frank Cluskey (Lab)	Vivion de Valera (FF)	Thomas J. Fitzpatrick (FF)	Maurice E. Dockrell (FG)
20th	1973	Frank Cluskey (Lab)	Vivion de Valera (FF)	Thomas J. Fitzpatrick (FF)	Maurice E. Dockrell (FG)
21st	1977	Constituency abolished			

Dáil	Election	Deputy (Party)	Deputy (Party)	Deputy (Party)	Deputy (Party)	Deputy (Party)
22nd	1981	Bertie Ahern (FF)	Michael Keating (FG)	Alice Glenn (FG)	Michael O'Leary (Lab)	George Colley (FF)
23rd	1982 (Feb)	Bertie Ahern (FF)	Michael Keating (FG)	Tony Gregory (Ind.)	Michael O'Leary (Lab)	George Colley (FF)
24th	1982 (Nov)	Bertie Ahern (FF)	Michael Keating (FG)	Tony Gregory (Ind.)	Alice Glenn (FG)	George Colley (FF)
24th	1983 by-election	Bertie Ahern (FF)	Michael Keating (FG)	Tony Gregory (Ind.)	Alice Glenn (FG)	Tom Leonard (FF)
25th	1987	Bertie Ahern (FF)	Michael Keating (PDs)	Tony Gregory (Ind.)	Dermot Fitzpatrick (FF)	John Stafford (FF)
26th	1989	Bertie Ahern (FF)	Pat Lee (FG)	Tony Gregory (Ind.)	Dermot Fitzpatrick (FF)	John Stafford (FF)
27th	1992	Bertie Ahern (FF)	Jim Mitchell (FG)	Tony Gregory (Ind.)	Joe Costello (Lab)	4 seats 1992–2016
28th	1997	Bertie Ahern (FF)	Jim Mitchell (FG)	Tony Gregory (Ind.)	Marian McGennis (FF)	4 seats 1992–2016
29th	2002	Bertie Ahern (FF)	Dermot Fitzpatrick (FF)	Tony Gregory (Ind.)	Joe Costello (Lab)	4 seats 1992–2016
30th	2007	Bertie Ahern (FF)	Cyprian Brady (FF)	Tony Gregory (Ind.)	Joe Costello (Lab)	4 seats 1992–2016
30th	2009 by-election	Bertie Ahern (FF)	Cyprian Brady (FF)	Maureen O'Sullivan (Ind.)	Joe Costello (Lab)	4 seats 1992–2016
31st	2011	Mary Lou McDonald (SF)	Paschal Donohoe (FG)	Maureen O'Sullivan (Ind.)	Joe Costello (Lab)	4 seats 1992–2016
32nd	2016	Mary Lou McDonald (SF)	Paschal Donohoe (FG)	Maureen O'Sullivan (Ind.)	3 seats 2016–2020	
33rd	2020	Mary Lou McDonald (SF)	Paschal Donohoe (FG)	Gary Gannon (SD)	Neasa Hourigan (GP)	4 seats from 2020
34th	2024	Mary Lou McDonald (SF)	Paschal Donohoe (FG)	Gary Gannon (SD)	Marie Sherlock (Lab)	4 seats from 2020
34th	2026 by-election	Mary Lou McDonald (SF)	Daniel Ennis (SD)	Gary Gannon (SD)	Marie Sherlock (Lab)	4 seats from 2020
