= Dublin City Council =

Local authority for Dublin city in Ireland

Dublin City Council Comhairle Cathrach Bhaile Átha Cliath

Type
- Type: City council

History
- Founded: 25 October 1840

Leadership
- Lord Mayor: Daryl Barron, FF
- Chief Executive: Richard Shakespeare

Structure
- Seats: 63
- Political groups: Administration (31) Fine Gael (11) Fianna Fáil (8) Green (8) Labour (4) Other groups (32) Social Democrats (9) Sinn Féin (9) PBP–Solidarity (2) Right to Change (1) Independent (11) (Note: John Lyons is a member of the unregistered Independent Left party and therefore sits as an independent on the council, and appeared as so on the 2024 ballot paper.)

Elections
- Voting system: Single transferable vote
- Last election: 7 June 2024

Motto
- Latin: Obedientia Civium Urbis Felicitas "The Obedience of the citizens produces a happy city"

Meeting place
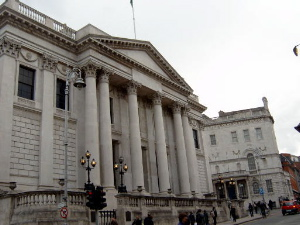
- City Hall, Dublin

Website
- Official website

Dublin City Council (Irish: Comhairle Cathrach Bhaile Átha Cliath) is the local authority of the city of Dublin in Ireland. As a city council, it is governed by the Local Government Act 2001. Until 2001, the authority was known as Dublin Corporation. The council is responsible for public housing and community, roads and transportation, urban planning and development, amenity and culture and environment. The council has 63 elected members and is the largest local council in Ireland. Elections are held every five years and are by single transferable vote. The head of the council has the honorific title of Lord Mayor. The city administration is headed by a chief executive, Richard Shakespeare. The council meets at City Hall, Dublin.

== Legal status ==
Local government in Dublin is regulated by the Local Government Act 2001. This provided for the renaming of the old Dublin Corporation to its present title of Dublin City Council. Dublin City Council sends seven representatives to the Eastern and Midland Regional Assembly, one of three such Assemblies in the state.

Dublin City is bordered by the counties of Fingal, South Dublin and Dún Laoghaire–Rathdown. These four local government areas comprise the traditional County Dublin. In 2013, all of Dublin's councils, except Fingal, supported the introduction of an executive mayor for the Dublin Metropolitan Area, and a Citizen's Assembly has been planned in order to establish what a combined Dublin Mayorship would look like.

=== Statutory functions ===
The functions of the City Council include: public housing, city library services, refuse services, drainage, driver and vehicle licensing, planning and roads. The Dublin City Council's Draft Budget for 2023 estimates a total revenue of €1.24 billion, which is an increase of €0.11bn from the previous year. The Housing and Building Division is the service with the largest spend, with an estimated operational expenditure of €550.5 million, almost €53 million more than in 2022. The estimated income for Housing and Building in 2023 is €457.5 million, up from €420.6m in 2022. The draft budget aims to maintain existing service levels at 2022 levels, with some modest increases in a small number of areas.

== Budget ==
=== 2023 (draft) ===
The estimated expenditure for 2023 is €1.24 billion, which is an increase of €0.11 billion over the 2022 Budget of €1.130 billion. The expenditure is divided into several service divisions, including Housing & Building, Road Transport & Safety, Water Services, Development Management, Environmental Services, Culture, Recreation & Amenity, and Agriculture, Education, Health & Welfare. The Housing and Building Division remains the service with the largest spend, with an estimated operational expenditure of €550.5m in 2023, almost €53m more than in 2022 (€497.4m). This increase relates to services that are largely government-funded, such as homeless services and RAS.

The estimated expenditure for each service division is:

- Housing and Building: €550,484,483
- Water Services: €68,093,780
- Development Management: €63,715,641
- Environmental Services: €247,419,867
- Culture, Recreation and Amenity: €122,254,773
- Agriculture, Education, Health and Welfare: €2,746,874

Compared to the 2022 budget, the estimated expenditure for 2023 increased by €0.11 billion. This increase is largely due to the increased spending on Housing and Building services, which are largely Government funded. The estimated net expenditure for each service division in the Dublin City Council's Draft Budget for 2023 is listed above.

The 2022 budget allocated €15.4 million for energy-related expenses for Dublin City Council (DCC). DCC faces an additional €22.5 million in costs over 2022 and 2023 due to energy and non-energy inflation. The government provides €5 million for rising energy costs, and DCC bears the impact of broader inflation. Additionally, a public sector pay deal includes €9.9 million and €25.9 million in 2022 and 2023, respectively, to support the City Council as an employer.

== History ==
The area governed by the council

Prior to 1841, the administrative and governmental system of Dublin, known as Dublin Corporation, was bicameral having an assembly of called the "House of Aldermen" and another called the "House of Sheriffs and Commons". Under the Municipal Corporations (Ireland) Act 1840, they were replaced by a unicameral assembly. The name Dublin City Council was adopted for the unicameral assembly. The Lord Mayor of Dublin presided over the assembly. This office had existed since 1665. The first City Council was elected in October 1841 when Daniel O'Connell became the first Lord Mayor. Since 1 January 2002, the functions of local government have been transferred to Dublin City Council. To coincide with its name change, the city council adopted a new logo and brand identity, based on a simplified version of the ancient "three castles" symbol. The current logo was adopted in 2026.

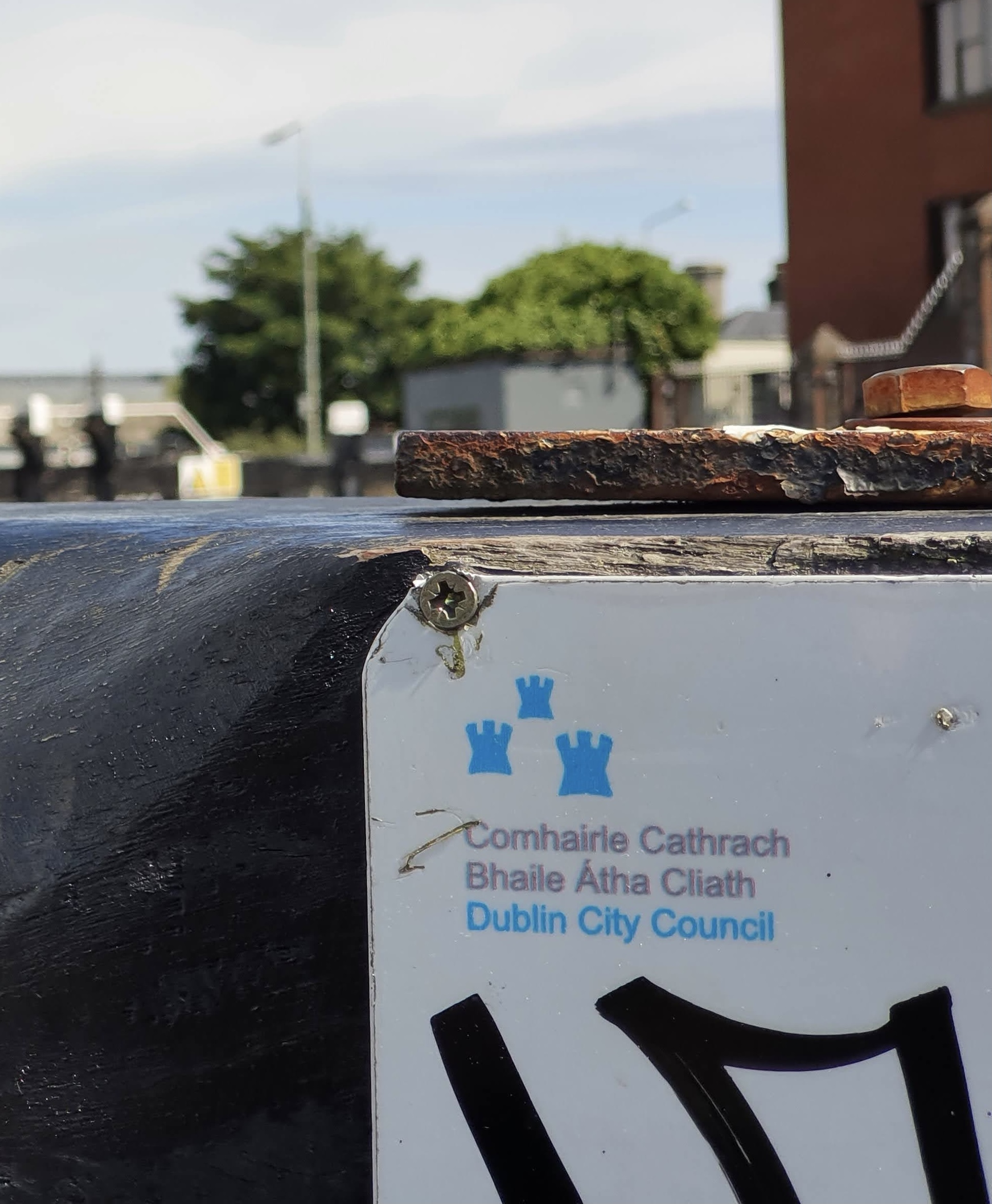
Dublin City Council's simplified "three castles" logo (2002–2026) beside the Royal Canal in Phibsborough.

== Structures ==
Executive power is shared between the council and an appointed executive official known as the chief executive. The chief executive is responsible for a staff of 6,200. The offices of the chief executive and other administrative staff are based in the Civic Offices on Wood Quay. The Lord Mayor of Dublin acts as chair of the council is the ceremonial head of the city government.

Representative power is vested in the city assembly which has 63 members. The City Council meets in plenary session on the first Monday of every month in Dublin City Hall. One of the council's most important roles is that of passing an annual budget. Should any Irish council fail to pass a budget within the allotted time, the Minister for the Environment is empowered to abolish it and grant its powers to a commissioner until the next scheduled council elections.

== Elections ==
Members of Dublin City Council are elected for a five-year term of office on the electoral system of proportional representation by means of the single transferable vote from multi-member local electoral areas.

WP / I4C / UL / RTC / IL / AAA / PBP / SF / SD / GP / Lab / Ind. / FF / PD / FG / II		Total seats
1985	6 / 1 / 2 / 4 / 26 / 13	52
1991	5 / 1 / 4 / 10 / 5 / 20 / 1 / 6	52
1999	4 / 2 / 14 / 3 / 20 / 9	52
2004	10 / 1 / 16 / 3 / 12 / 1 / 9	52
2009	2 / 7 / 19 / 6 / 6 / 12	52
2014	1 / 1 / 5 / 16 / 3 / 8 / 12 / 9 / 8	63
2019	1 / 1 / 2 / 8 / 5 / 10 / 8 / 8 / 11 / 9	63
2024	1 / 1 / 2 / 9 / 10 / 8 / 4 / 8 / 8 / 11 / 1	63

== Local electoral areas ==
Dublin City is divided into LEAs, defined by electoral divisions. The electoral divisions were formerly known as wards and were defined in 1986, subject to revision in 1994 and in 1997.

LEA	Definition	Seats
Artane–Whitehall	Beaumont A, Beaumont B, Beaumont C, Harmonstown A, Kilmore A, Kilmore B, Kilmore C, Kilmore D, Priorswood A, Priorswood B, Priorswood C, Priorswood D, Priorswood E, Whitehall A, Whitehall B, Whitehall C and Whitehall D.	6
Ballyfermot–Drimnagh	Carna, Chapelizod, Cherry Orchard A, Cherry Orchard C, Crumlin A, Crumlin E, Crumlin F, Decies, Drumfinn, Inchicore A, Inchicore B, Kilmainham A, Kylemore, Walkinstown A, Walkinstown B and Walkinstown C.	5
Ballymun–Finglas	Ballygall A, Ballygall B, Ballygall C, Ballygall D, Ballymun A, Ballymun B, Ballymun C, Ballymun D, Ballymun E, Ballymun F, Finglas North A, Finglas North B, Finglas North C, Finglas South A, Finglas South B, Finglas South C and Finglas South D.	6
Cabra–Glasnevin	Arran Quay A, Ashtown A, Ashtown B, Botanic A, Botanic B, Botanic C, Cabra East A, Cabra East B, Cabra East C, Cabra West A, Cabra West B, Cabra West C, Cabra West D, Drumcondra South C, Inns Quay A and Inns Quay B; and that part of the electoral division of Phoenix Park not contained in the local electoral area of South West Inner City.	7
Clontarf	Beaumont D, Beaumont E, Beaumont F, Clontarf East A, Clontarf East B, Clontarf East C, Clontarf East D, Clontarf East E, Clontarf West A, Clontarf West B, Clontarf West C, Clontarf West D, Clontarf West E, Drumcondra South A, Grace Park and Harmonstown B.	6
Donaghmede	Ayrfield, Edenmore, Grange A, Grange B, Grange C, Grange D, Grange E, Raheny-Foxfield, Raheny-Greendale and Raheny-St. Assam.	5
Kimmage–Rathmines	Crumlin B, Crumlin C, Crumlin D, Kimmage A, Kimmage B, Kimmage C, Kimmage D, Kimmage E, Rathfarnham, Rathmines West A, Rathmines West C, Rathmines West D, Rathmines West E, Rathmines West F, Terenure A, Terenure B, Terenure C and Terenure D.	6
North Inner City	Arran Quay B, Arran Quay C, Arran Quay D, Arran Quay E, Ballybough A, Ballybough B, Drumcondra South B, Inns Quay C, Mountjoy A, Mountjoy B, North City, North Dock A, North Dock B, North Dock C, Rotunda A and Rotunda B.	7
Pembroke	Pembroke East B, Pembroke East C, Pembroke East D, Pembroke East E, Pembroke West B, Pembroke West C, Rathmines East A, Rathmines East B, Rathmines East C, Rathmines East D and Rathmines West B.	5
South East Inner City	Mansion House A, Mansion House B, Pembroke East A, Pembroke West A, Royal Exchange A, Royal Exchange B, St. Kevin's, South Dock, Wood Quay A and Wood Quay B.	5
South West Inner City	Kilmainham B, Kilmainham C, Merchants Quay A, Merchants Quay B, Merchants Quay C, Merchants Quay D, Merchants Quay E, Merchants Quay F, Ushers A, Ushers B, Ushers C, Ushers D, Ushers E and Ushers F; and that part of the electoral division of Phoenix Park situated south of a line drawn along Chapelizod Road, Conyngham Road and Parkgate Street.	5

== Councillors ==
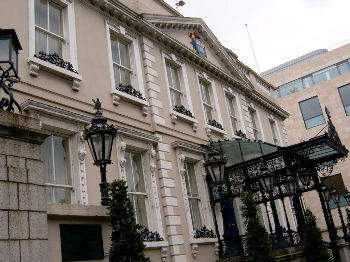
Mansion House. Official residence of the Lord Mayor of Dublin.

=== 2024 seats summary ===
Party	Seats
Fine Gael	11
Social Democrats	10
Sinn Féin	9
Fianna Fáil	8
Green	8
Labour	4
PBP–Solidarity	2
Independent Ireland	1
Right to Change	1
Independent	9

=== Councillors by electoral area ===
This list reflects the order in which councillors were elected on 7 June 2024.

Council members from 2024 election
Local electoral area	Name	Party
Artane–Whitehall	Racheal Batten	Fianna Fáil
Artane–Whitehall	Edel Moran	Sinn Féin
Artane–Whitehall	John Lyons	Independent Left
Artane–Whitehall	Declan Flanagan	Fine Gael
Artane–Whitehall	Jesslyn Henry	Social Democrats
Artane–Whitehall	Aisling Silke (Note: Changed party, see table for details.)	Social Democrats
Ballyfermot–Drimnagh	Daithí Doolan	Sinn Féin
Ballyfermot–Drimnagh	Vincent Jackson	Independent
Ballyfermot–Drimnagh	Hazel De Nortúin	PBP–Solidarity
Ballyfermot–Drimnagh	Ray Cunningham	Green
Ballyfermot–Drimnagh	Philip Sutcliffe Snr	Independent Ireland
Ballymun–Finglas	Keith Connolly	Fianna Fáil
Ballymun–Finglas	Gavin Pepper	Independent
Ballymun–Finglas	Anthony Connaghan	Sinn Féin
Ballymun–Finglas	Conor Reddy	PBP–Solidarity
Ballymun–Finglas	Mary Callaghan	Social Democrats
Ballymun–Finglas	Leslie Kane	Sinn Féin
Cabra–Glasnevin	Cieran Perry	Independent
Cabra–Glasnevin	Feljin Jose	Green
Cabra–Glasnevin	Colm O'Rourke	Fine Gael
Cabra–Glasnevin	Gayle Ralph	Fine Gael
Cabra–Glasnevin	Cat O'Driscoll	Social Democrats
Cabra–Glasnevin	John Stephens	Fianna Fáil
Cabra–Glasnevin	Séamas McGrattan	Sinn Féin
Clontarf	Naoise Ó Muirí (Note: Replaced during term, see table for details.)	Fine Gael
Clontarf	Deirdre Heney	Fianna Fáil
Clontarf	Barry Heneghan	Independent
Clontarf	Catherine Stocker	Social Democrats
Clontarf	Donna Cooney	Green
Clontarf	Alison Field	Labour
Donaghmede	Tom Brabazon	Fianna Fáil
Donaghmede	Daryl Barron	Fianna Fáil
Donaghmede	Paddy Monahan	Social Democrats
Donaghmede	Supriya Singh	Fine Gael
Donaghmede	Mícheál Mac Donncha	Sinn Féin
Kimmage–Rathmines	Pat Dunne	Right to Change
Kimmage–Rathmines	Carolyn Moore	Green
Kimmage–Rathmines	Punam Rane	Fine Gael
Kimmage–Rathmines	Fiona Connelly	Labour
Kimmage–Rathmines	Eoin Hayes	Social Democrats
Kimmage–Rathmines	Patrick Kinsella	Fine Gael
North Inner City	Ray McAdam	Fine Gael
North Inner City	Janet Horner	Green
North Inner City	Christy Burke	Independent
North Inner City	Malachy Steenson	Independent
North Inner City	Nial Ring	Independent
North Inner City	Janice Boylan	Sinn Féin
North Inner City	Daniel Ennis	Social Democrats
Pembroke	James Geoghegan	Fine Gael
Pembroke	Hazel Chu	Green
Pembroke	Dermot Lacey	Labour
Pembroke	Emma Blain	Fine Gael
Pembroke	Rory Hogan	Fianna Fáil
South East Inner City	Claire Byrne	Green
South East Inner City	Kourtney Kenny	Sinn Féin
South East Inner City	Danny Byrne	Fine Gael
South East Inner City	Cian Farrell	Social Democrats
South East Inner City	Mannix Flynn	Independent
South West Inner City	Michael Pidgeon	Green
South West Inner City	Darragh Moriarty	Labour
South West Inner City	Jen Cummins	Social Democrats
South West Inner City	Ammar Ali	Fianna Fáil
South West Inner City	Máire Devine	Sinn Féin

==== Co-options ====
Party	Outgoing	LEA	Reason	Date	Co-optee
Fianna Fáil	Tom Brabazon	Donaghmede	Elected to 34th Dáil at the 2024 general election	18 December 2024	Aoibheann Mahon
Social Democrats	Jen Cummins	South West Inner City	Elected to 34th Dáil at the 2024 general election	18 December 2024	Lesley Byrne
Sinn Féin	Máire Devine	South West Inner City	Elected to 34th Dáil at the 2024 general election	18 December 2024	Ciaran Ó Meachair
Fine Gael	James Geoghegan	Pembroke	Elected to 34th Dáil at the 2024 general election	18 December 2024	David Coffey
Social Democrats	Eoin Hayes	Kimmage–Rathmines	Elected to 34th Dáil at the 2024 general election	18 December 2024	Tara Deacy
Independent	Barry Heneghan	Clontarf	Elected to 34th Dáil at the 2024 general election	18 December 2024	Kevin Breen
Fine Gael	Naoise Ó Muirí	Clontarf	Elected to 34th Dáil at the 2024 general election	18 December 2024	Clodagh Ní Mhuirí
Social Democrats	Tara Deacy	Kimmage–Rathmines	Resignation	22 March 2025	Noelle Brown
Social Democrats	Catherine Stocker	Clontarf	Resignation	24 September 2025	Karl Stanley
Social Democrats	Daniel Ennis	North Inner City	Elected to 34th Dáil at the 2026 Dublin Central by-election	22 May 2026	Ellen O'Doherty

==== Changes in affiliation ====
Name	LEA	Elected as	New affiliation	Date
Philip Sutcliffe Snr	Ballyfermot–Drimnagh	Independent Ireland	Independent	23 November 2024
Aisling Silke	Artane–Whitehall	Social Democrats	Independent	29 June 2026

== Council buildings ==
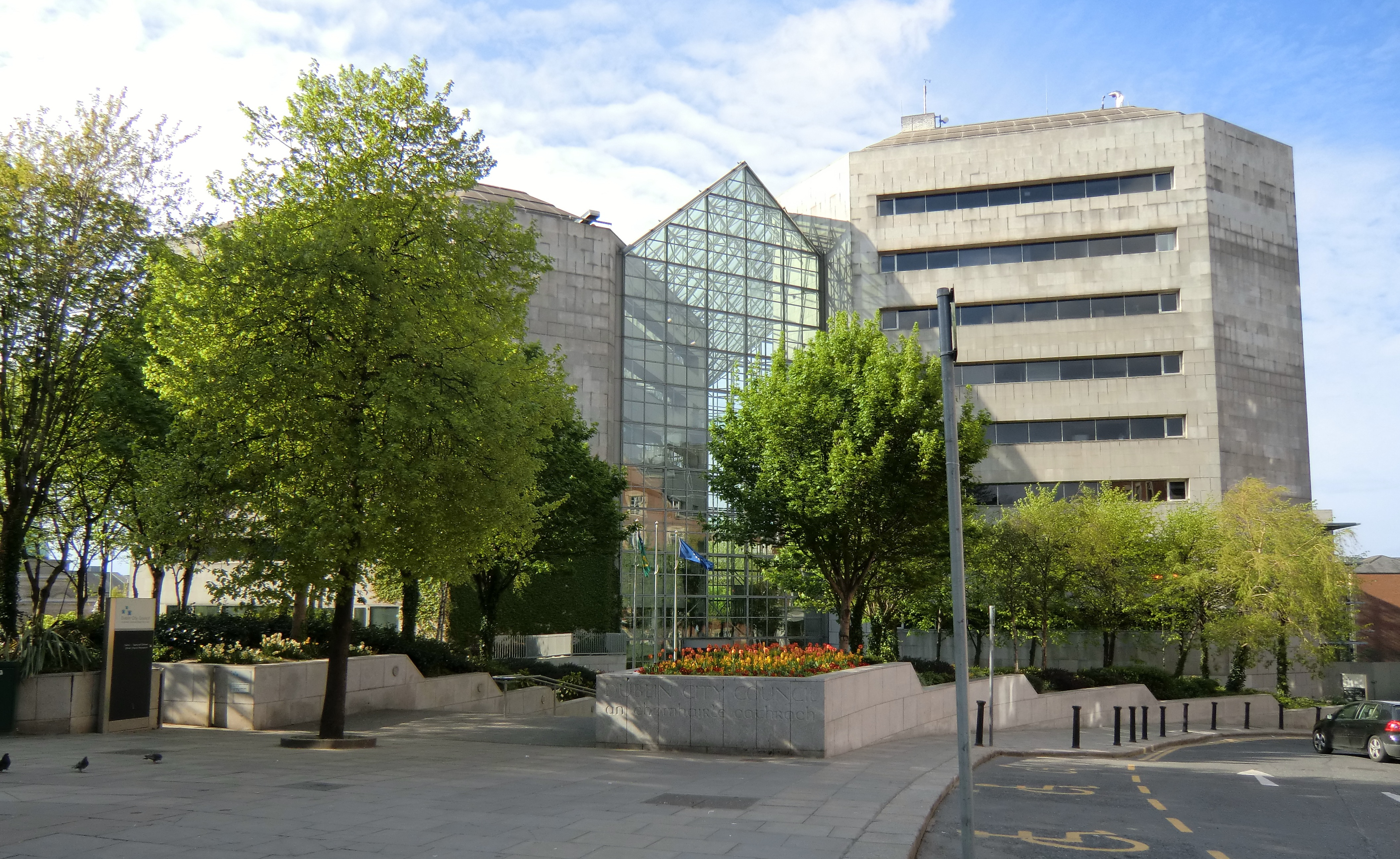
The Civic Offices, Wood Quay Executive and administrative offices.

The Lord Mayor's official residence is the Mansion House, which first became the residence of the Lord Mayor in 1715.

Council meetings take place in the headquarters at Dublin City Hall. Formerly Royal Exchange, the City Hall is one of Dublin's finest buildings and located on Dame Street. It was built in 1769–79 to the winning design of Thomas Cooley. In an architectural competition, James Gandon was the runner-up with a scheme that many people favoured. The building was taken over for city government use in the 1850s.
