= Social Democrats (Ireland) =

Irish political party

Social Democrats Na Daonlathaithe Sóisialta
- Abbreviation: Soc Dems
- Leader: Holly Cairns
- Deputy leader: Cian O'Callaghan
- General Secretary: Sabrina Ryan
- Chairperson: Sorcha O'Neill
- Founders: Catherine Murphy; Róisín Shortall; Stephen Donnelly; see
- Founded: 15 July 2015
- Headquarters: 28 South Frederick St, Dublin
- Membership (2021): ▲2,000+
- Ideology: Social democracy Pro-Europeanism
- Political position: Centre-left
- Continental affiliation: Unified European Left Group
- Colours: Purple
- Dáil Éireann: 12 / 174
- Seanad Éireann: 1 / 60
- Local government: 31 / 949

Website
- socialdemocrats.ie

The Social Democrats (Irish: Na Daonlathaithe Sóisialta) are a social democratic political party in Ireland. Led by Holly Cairns since March 2023, the party was launched on 15 July 2015 by three independent TDs: Catherine Murphy, Róisín Shortall, and Stephen Donnelly. It promotes the Nordic model of political economy, pro-European views, and implementing Sláintecare, a plan to reform the Irish healthcare system.

== History ==
=== 2015–2019: Foundation and early elections ===
The Social Democrats was established with a co-leadership arrangement between its three founding members. Róisín Shortall is a former Labour Party TD and former Minister of State at the Department of Health. She resigned from the role and from Labour in September 2012, citing lack of support and the lack of an explanation from then-Minister for Health James Reilly concerning his controversial decision to locate a new primary care centre in his own constituency. Catherine Murphy was successively a member of the Workers' Party, Democratic Left and the Labour Party before being elected as an independent TD in 2005. Stephen Donnelly first entered politics as an independent TD in the 2011 general election, having previously worked as a consultant for McKinsey and Company. Both Murphy and Donnelly were members of the Technical Group in the 31st Dáil, with Murphy having served as its Chief Whip.

The party ran fourteen candidates in the 2016 general election, including its three incumbent TDs, former Labour Party Senator James Heffernan, and county councillors Gary Gannon and Cian O'Callaghan. Their three incumbent TDs were re-elected, but none of their other candidates were elected.

In May 2016, the party formed a technical group within the Dáil with the Green Party.

On 5 September 2016, Stephen Donnelly resigned as joint leader and left the party, stating that he was doing so "with great sadness, having vested so much together with my parliamentary colleagues, Catherine and Roisin, a small core team and many volunteers across the country, into the establishment of the Social Democrats over the last 20 months", but referring to his relationship with his fellow leaders, that "some partnerships simply don't work". On 2 February 2017, he joined Fianna Fáil.

=== 2019 local and European elections ===
The Social Democrats contested their first European Parliament elections in May 2019, with councillor Gary Gannon running for election in the Dublin constituency. Gannon received 5.6% of the first-preference votes, finishing 6th out of 19 candidates in the first count. He was eliminated on the 14th count. The party did not contest the other Irish constituencies of Midlands–North-West or South at this election.

The party also contested their first local elections in May 2019. The Social Democrats put forward 58 candidates for seats on local councils. 55% of the candidates were women, making it the second highest percentage of female candidates put forward among all political parties. 19 of the 58 candidates were elected, more than trebling the party's representation in local government. Ellie Kisyombe, a Malawi-born asylum seeker running for the Social Democrats in Dublin's North Inner City LEA, was retained after a review of inconsistencies in her account of her asylum history and time in direct provision; following this, three members of the party's National Executive resigned.

=== 2019 by-elections and the 2020 general election ===
In November 2019, the party contested 3 of the 4 by-elections caused by the election of Irish TDs to the European Parliament, but did not win any seats, with their candidates all receiving between 2.5% and 4.4% of the vote.

In the 2020 general election, the party ran 20 candidates in 20 constituencies, and increased their seats to six, despite a small fall in the number of first preference votes received. Murphy and Shortall were re-elected in their constituencies, and were joined by Holly Cairns in Cork South-West, Gary Gannon in Dublin Central, Cian O'Callaghan in Dublin Bay North and Jennifer Whitmore in Wicklow. The Social Democrats finished level on seats with the Labour Party and exceeded the seats of other left-leaning parties Solidarity–People Before Profit and Independents 4 Change.

=== Holly Cairns as leader ===
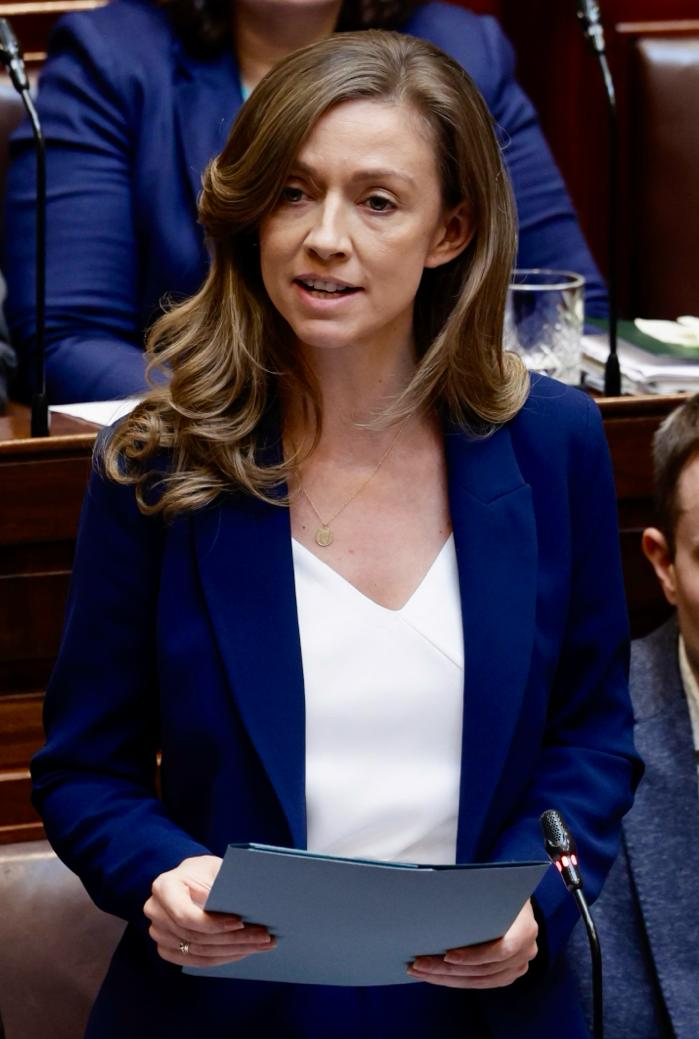
Cairns speaking in the Dáil in 2024

On 22 February 2023, Murphy and Shortall announced that they would step down as co-leaders of the Social Democrats. Holly Cairns was the only candidate to put her name forward for leadership of the party, and she was announced as the new leader on 1 March. On becoming leader, Cairns reiterated that the Social Democrats have no interest in merging with the Labour Party, which had been repeatedly suggested but rejected by the Social Democrats' party leadership. She said that housing and Sláintecare would be red line issues for the Social Democrats in any coalition talks with any party. On 4 July 2023 it was announced that Cian O'Callaghan had been appointed to the newly created role of deputy party leader.

In the June 2024 local elections, the Social Democrats ran 78 candidates, with 35 elected, including 10 on Dublin City Council, where they became the second largest party. For the 2024 European elections in Ireland, the party ran three candidates, one in each of the Irish constituencies. While the Social Democrats' first preference vote share increased to 2.95%, none of their candidates were elected.

At the 2024 general election in November, the party almost doubled its number of TDs, going from 6 to 11, tying with Labour to become the fourth-largest party in Ireland. The party also gained its first Senator in Patricia Stephenson at the 2025 Seanad election. However, the party lost a TD at the same time following the indefinite suspension of Eoin Hayes. In July 2025 Hayes was readmitted to the parliamentary party. Shortly after Hayes' readmission, Galway city councillor Eibhlín Seoighthe resigned from the party.

The party jointly nominated Catherine Connolly in the 2025 Irish presidential election as part of a broad left-wing alliance. They first announced their intention to support Connolly on 11 July 2025, alongside People Before Profit, 100% Redress and several independent politicians. Jennifer Whitmore said she was the overwhelming choice of party members.

In May 2026, the Social Democrats brought forward the Reproductive Rights (Amendment) Bill. The bill "would have abolished the three-day waiting period for an abortion, revised the criteria for a termination on the grounds of fatal foetal abnormality, and removed the criminal sanctions found in the current laws". The bill was defeated in the Dáil by 85 votes to 30. There were 36 abstentions.

== Elected representatives ==
As of May 2026, the Social Democrats have 12 TDs.

Through 2017 and 2018, the Social Democrats recruited several sitting county councillors, including Jennifer Whitmore (Wicklow County Council), Joe Harris (Cork County Council), Dermot Looney (South Dublin County Council), Paul Mulville (Fingal County Council) and June Murphy (Cork County Council). In the 2019 local elections they won 19 council seats, but by 2023 they had expanded this to 22 by recruiting three county councillors; Mary Roche (Waterford City and County Council), Eoin Ó Broin (South Dublin County Council) and Liam Quaide (Cork County Council).

In 2023, Galway City Councillor Owen Hanley resigned as a councillor and as a party member, following allegations made against him on social media.

In the 2024 local elections, the party won 35 councillor seats, up from the 19 they had previously held. They performed particularly well in the Dublin City Council election, doubling their seat share to 10 and becoming the second largest party behind Fine Gael.

Following the 2024 general election, the Social Democrats had 11 TDs. In December, Dublin Bay South TD Eoin Hayes was suspended from the party after he confirmed he gave incorrect details about when he had sold shares he held in software firm Palantir, which supplies technology to the Israel Defense Forces. Hayes was later readmitted on 25 July 2025.

At the 2025 Seanad election, the party saw its first ever Senator elected in Patricia Stephenson for the Labour Panel. (Note: Senator James Heffernan joined the Social Democrats in September 2015; he had been elected as a Labour candidate in 2011 and lost the whip in 2012. Heffernan was a Social Democrat Senator for nine months until the 24th Seanad was dissolved in June 2016, but was never elected as a Social Democrat candidate.)

At the 2026 Dublin Central by-election the Social Democrats’ candidate Daniel Ennis was elected. This was the party's first Dáil by-election victory, and the first time the party had two TDs in a single constituency.

== Ideology and policies ==
The party is centre-left and supports Irish membership of the European Union. At the party's launch, its three TDs stated their support for the Nordic model of social democracy, backed the repeal of the Eighth Amendment and the Official Secrets Act, and stated their opposition to domestic water charges. The party is also in favour of a directly elected mayor of Dublin.

In their 2024 general election manifesto, the party outlined their 5 main aims and stated that they would only ever enter into a government that would work to implement these aims. Party leader, Holly Cairns stated that these were the party's red-lines.

- Build 50,000 affordable purchase homes.
- Fully implement Sláintecare.
- Agree a plan to reach Irish climate targets and avoid €8 billion in fines.
- Appoint a full cabinet Minister for Disability.
- Build high quality public childcare.

=== Healthcare ===
One of the party's core policies is Sláintecare, an Irish national health service proposal. Sláintecare is a fully costed plan for a universal, single-tier public health service that would join up health and social care in Ireland and be free at the point of use. Sláintecare was developed as the result of a cross-Party Oireachtas Committee chaired by the Social Democrats' Róisín Shortall, which sought to examine the issue of healthcare in Ireland. The party's Sláintecare policy plan also includes (but is not limited to): a legal entitlement to homecare packages for older people, significantly reducing prescription charges and lowering costs for medicines, providing access to basic procedures at a local level, and improved funding for mental health, including counselling, community programmes, and adult mental health teams.

=== Housing ===
The Social Democrats are in favour of universal access to affordable housing. In May 2017, the party published the Urban Regeneration and Housing Bill to eliminate loopholes to the vacant site levy and increase penalties for developers engaged in land hoarding. In January 2018 the party called for a nationwide rent freeze. In December 2019 the party proposed a motion of no-confidence in housing minister Eoghan Murphy.

In their 2020 manifesto, the party called for building 100,000 homes over a five-year period to be delivered by a new housing agency, and pledged to end homelessness. In their 2024 manifesto, the party stated that if elected to government they would deliver 50,000 affordable purchase homes and 25,000 cost rental homes over five years.

=== Economic ===
In their 2020 manifesto, the party said it would ban exploitative work contracts, encourage union membership and protect younger workers. In their October 2023 alternative budget, they advocated for a new tax on assets valued at over 1 million euro and an increase of the minimum wage by 2 euro, to €13.30 per hour.

=== Social ===
The Social Democrats have published legislation on equal access and non-religious discrimination in schools, extended unpaid parental leave and greater minimum notice periods for residential tenancies. The party called for a yes vote in the Referendum to Repeal the Eighth Amendment on 25 May 2018. The party supports an end to conversion therapy.

=== Education ===
In their 2020 manifesto, the party committed to making primary school education free, reducing third level fees and expanding the SUSI grant system.

=== Disability ===
In their 2024 manifesto, the party pledged to appoint a Senior Minister for Disability if elected to government. The party also stated that they wish to implement a weekly Cost of Disability payment to reflect the higher costs of living with a disability, as well as address the waiting lists for an assessment of need and issues around staffing of Children's Disability Network Teams (CDNT).

=== Climate ===
The party's 2020 manifesto vowed to build more cycle lanes, cut public transport fares and introduce a dedicated public transport policing unit. On climate policies, they called for banning fracking and pledged to meet the targets in the Paris Agreement.

=== Drugs ===
The party supports the decriminalisation of drugs for personal consumption. The Social Democrats instead want to take a health-led approach to drugs, such as by tackling the socio-economic and mental health factors that pre-dispose people to substance abuse. It also advocates for better funding for drug treatment and health services, as well as improved public education around drugs.

=== Anti-corruption ===
The party has called for the establishment of an independent anti-corruption agency in Ireland to tackle white-collar crime and corruption in the corporate world and political spheres.

=== Israel and Palestine ===
In November 2023, the Social Democrats put forward a Dáil motion seeking to expel the Israeli ambassador to Ireland, Dana Erlich, and to place economic sanctions on Israel amidst the Israeli invasion of the Gaza Strip. The motion was voted down by the government. Two months later, the party put forward a motion to back South Africa's case against Israel in the International Court of Justice; the government put forward a counter-motion, which passed in its place.

As part of their 2024 manifesto, the party introduced a plan for a €10 million fund to bring Palestinian children to Ireland for medical treatment.

== Leadership ==
=== Leaders ===
Name	Portrait	Period	Constituency
Catherine Murphy; Róisín Shortall; Stephen Donnelly		2015–2016	Kildare North; Dublin North-West; Wicklow
Catherine Murphy; Róisín Shortall		2016–2023	Kildare North; Dublin North-West
Holly Cairns		2023–present	Cork South-West

=== Deputy leader ===
Name	Portrait	Period	Constituency
Cian O'Callaghan		2023–present	Dublin Bay North

== Election results ==
=== Dáil Éireann ===
Election	Leaders	FPv	%	Seats	%	±	Dáil	Government
2016	Stephen Donnelly, Catherine Murphy, Róisín Shortall	64,094	3.0 (#7)	3 / 158	1.9 (#8)	New	32nd	Opposition; 30th, 31st government (FG-Ind minority)
2020	Catherine Murphy, Róisín Shortall	63,404	2.9 (#6)	6 / 160	3.8 (#5)	▲3	33rd	Opposition; 32nd, 33rd, 34th government (FF-FG-GP majority)
2024	Holly Cairns	106,028	4.8 (#4)	11 / 174	6.3 (#4)	▲5	34th	Opposition; 35th government (FF-FG-Ind majority)

=== Presidential elections ===
Election	Nominee	Party	Alliance	1st	Final
2018	Michael D. Higgins	IND	List: Fianna Fáil; Fine Gael; Green; Labour	55.8%	—N/a
2025	Catherine Connolly	IND	List: Sinn Féin; Green; PBP–Solidarity; Labour; 100% Redress; Independents	63.6%	—N/a

=== Local elections ===
Election	1st pref votes	%	Seats	+/–
2019	39,644	2.3 (#6)	19 / 949	Steady
2024	63,273	3.4 (#5)	35 / 949	▲16

=== European Parliament ===
Election	Leader	1st pref Votes	%	Seats	+/−	EP Group
2019	Catherine Murphy; Róisín Shortall	20,331	1.21 (#8)	0 / 13	New	−
2024	Holly Cairns	51,571	2.95 (#9)	0 / 14	0	−

=== Seanad elections ===
Election	Seats	+/–
2020	0 / 60	Steady
2025	1 / 60	▲1
