= 2014 Dublin City Council election =

Part of the 2014 Irish local elections

- 23 May 2014

All 63 seats on Dublin City Council 32 seats needed for a majority
	First party	Second party	Third party
Party	Sinn Féin	Fianna Fáil	Fine Gael
Seats won	16	9	8
Seat change	▲9	▲3	▼4
	Fourth party	Fifth party	Sixth party
Party	Labour	People Before Profit	Green
Seats won	8	5	3
Seat change	▼11	▲3	▲3
	Seventh party	Eighth party	Ninth party
Party	United Left	Anti-Austerity Alliance	Independent
Seats won	1	1	12
Seat change	▲1	▲1	▲6
- Map showing the area of Dublin City Council
Council control before election
Labour Party
Fine Gael
Council control after election
Sinn Féin
Labour Party
Green Party

An election to all 63 seats on Dublin City Council was held on 23 May 2014 as part of the 2014 Irish local elections. The city of Dublin was divided into nine local electoral areas to elect councillors for a five-year term of office on the electoral system of proportional representation by means of the single transferable vote (PR-STV).

== Overview ==
Under the Local Government Reform Act 2014, Dublin City Council was expanded from 52 to 63 seats. Sinn Féin won 16 seats, a gain of 7 seats, to emerge as the largest party and at least 1 seat in every LEA except Rathgar–Rathmines. Fianna Fáil won 9 seats, a gain of 3 seats in total. The party won 2 seats in Clontarf and 1 seat in every LEA except the North-Inner City. Fine Gael lost 4 seats to return with 8 seats overall. The party won 2 seats in Pembroke–South Dock and Rathgar–Rathmines but found itself without representation in Ballyfermot–Drimnagh, Cabra–Finglas and Crumlin–Kimmage. The Labour Party lost 11 seats in all, including the outgoing Lord Mayor of Dublin, Oisín Quinn, to return with just 8 councillors in all. People Before Profit gained 3 seats to return with 5 seats in all and the Green Party made a return to the council with 3 seats. The United Left and the Anti-Austerity Alliance both returned 1 seat while Independents doubled their numbers to 12 seats.

== Results by party ==
Party	Seats	±	1st pref	FPv%	±%
Sinn Féin	16	▲9	33,393	24.22	▲11.55
Fianna Fáil	9	▲3	19,957	14.47	▼3.63
Fine Gael	8	▼4	19,275	13.98	▼4.72
Labour	8	▼11	17,524	12.71	▼16.69
People Before Profit	5	▲3	9,544	6.92	▲2.75
Green	3	▲3	7,000	5.08	▲1.54
United Left	1	▲1	2,180	1.58	New
Anti-Austerity Alliance	1	▲1	2,025	1.47	New
Éirígí	0	Steady	1,705	1.24	New
Direct Democracy	0	Steady	446	0.32	New
Workers' Party	0	Steady	360	0.26	▼0.53
Independent	12	▲6	24,470	17.75	▲5.27
Total	63	▲11	137,879	100.00	

== Results by local electoral area ==
*: Outgoing councillor.

=== Ballyfermot–Drimnagh ===
Ballyfermot–Drimnagh: 6 Seats
Party	Candidate	FPv%	Count											
Party	Candidate	FPv%	1	2	3	4	5	6	7	8	9	10	11	12
Sinn Féin	Daithí Doolan	19.28	2,834											
People Before Profit	Bríd Smith	13.82	2,031	2,091	2,130									
Independent	Paul Hand	8.84	1,300	1,327	1,403	1,516	1,517	1,608	1,680	1,799	1,845	1,924	1,954	2,151
Fianna Fáil	Daithí de Róiste	8.74	1,284	1,305	1,318	1,335	1,337	1,346	1,391	1,408	1,460	1,531	1,551	1,695
Independent	Vincent Jackson	7.97	1,171	1,203	1,261	1,311	1,316	1,336	1,379	1,476	1,606	1,728	1,775	1,902
Sinn Féin	Greg Kelly	7.75	1,139	1,638	1,669	1,695	1,696	1,743	1,768	1,898	1,937	2,209		
Fine Gael	Philip Nolan	5.82	856	859	862	917	918	930	989	1,007	1,121	1,146	1,151	
Labour	Michael O'Sullivan	4.79	704	705	710	721	721	749	818	852	1,140	1,164	1,171	1,518
Labour	Sheila Howes	4.42	650	660	672	689	690	698	797	814				
Éirígí	Louise Minihan	4.35	639	677	699	720	724	737	760	818	857			
Green	Oisín Ó hAlmhain	3.74	550	554	558	571	571	587						
United Left	Brian Stafford	2.90	426	430	437	445	448							
People Before Profit	Paul Shields	2.78	409	420	437	465	477	634	690					
Independent	Peter O'Neill	2.51	369	374	399									
Independent	Henry Harding	1.20	176	189										
Independent	Noel Bennett	0.69	102	106										
Independent	Laurence Vize	0.39	58	60										
Electorate: 34,597 Valid: 14,698 (42.48%) Spoilt: 272 Quota: 2,100 Turnout: 14,970 (43.27%)

=== Ballymun ===
Ballymun: 7 Seats
Party	Candidate	FPv%	Count														
Party	Candidate	FPv%	1	2	3	4	5	6	7	8	9	10	11	12	13	14	15
Sinn Féin	Noeleen Reilly	14.82	2,540														
Sinn Féin	Cathleen Carney Boud	13.58	2,328														
Labour	Andrew Montague	9.16	1,570	1,618	1,626	1,643	1,646	1,651	1,663	1,687	1,710	1,733	1,798	1,870	1,998	2,158	
Fianna Fáil	Paul McAuliffe	8.69	1,490	1,503	1,514	1,518	1,520	1,531	1,541	1,554	1,568	1,588	1,653	1,679	1,740	1,830	1,936
Fine Gael	Noel Rock	7.27	1,247	1,256	1,262	1,266	1,275	1,285	1,290	1,310	1,319	1,370	1,544	1,603	1,680	2,166	
Fianna Fáil	Laura Reid	6.58	1,128	1,146	1,154	1,162	1,169	1,183	1,189	1,212	1,220	1,252	1,291	1,327	1,381	1,436	1,531
Labour	Aine Clancy	5.50	943	952	958	961	965	969	972	999	1,016	1,034	1,096	1,118	1,276	1,496	1,606
Fine Gael	Gerry Breen	5.39	924	929	931	934	938	938	939	948	955	992	1,129	1,144	1,183		
Green	Caroline Conroy	4.30	738	764	780	784	789	794	817	855	885	912	949	997			
Fine Gael	Bill Tormey	3.95	678	689	692	694	700	700	707	718	729	754					
People Before Profit	Andrew Keegan	3.74	642	711	744	762	769	807	907	930	1,066	1,116	1,150	1,289	1,444	1,473	1,869
Independent	Geraldine Gough	3.54	607	626	642	655	672	689	725	748	780	889	911	1,113	1,238	1,279	
Independent	Seán Tyrrell	2.74	470	527	537	547	585	595	623	707	755	843	871				
Independent	Peter McDonnell	2.44	418	425	428	457	465	479	497	550	567						
Workers' Party	Owen Martin	2.10	360	397	426	429	433	440	466	477							
Independent	Agnieszka Wieczorkowska	1.97	338	351	357	363	389	397	411								
Anti-Austerity Alliance	Helen Metcalfe	1.50	258	285	299	305	314	330									
Direct Democracy	Cormac McKay	0.94	162	173	179	183	184										
Independent	Cearuil Swords	0.91	156	165	170	177											
Independent	Austin McCoy	0.85	146	155	158												
Electorate: 38,875 Valid: 17,143 (44.10%) Spoilt: 311 Quota: 2,143 Turnout: 17,454 (44.90%)

=== Beaumont–Donaghmede ===
Beaumont–Donaghmede: 9 Seats
Party	Candidate	FPv%	Count													
Party	Candidate	FPv%	1	2	3	4	5	6	7	8	9	10	11	12	13	14
Sinn Féin	Larry O'Toole	15.29	3,337													
Fianna Fáil	Tom Brabazon	10.70	2,334													
People Before Profit	John Lyons	10.60	2,313													
Sinn Féin	Mícheál Mac Donncha	10.29	2,245													
Sinn Féin	Denise Mitchell	9.08	1,982	2,781												
Fine Gael	Declan Flanagan	6.49	1,415	1,429	1,442	1,457	1,460	1,579	1,584	1,586	1,592	1,621	1,634	2,012	2,221	
Independent	Paddy Bourke	5.33	1,163	1,214	1,278	1,287	1,299	1,305	1,337	1,345	1,364	1,415	1,462	1,484	1,545	2,080
Fianna Fáil	Sean Paul Mahon	4.74	1,034	1,068	1,098	1,170	1,173	1,181	1,187	1,190	1,194	1,227	1,247	1,288	1,345	1,384
Labour	Brian McDowell	4.19	914	929	937	947	950	961	966	969	972	1,005	1,010	1,101		
Anti-Austerity Alliance	Michael O'Brien	4.15	906	961	1,050	1,057	1,105	1,106	1,169	1,187	1,544	1,624	1,812	1,840	1,921	2,205
Labour	Alison Gilliland	4.00	873	895	914	919	923	937	945	946	951	1,019	1,033	1,144	1,569	1,637
Independent	Paul Clarke	3.82	833	865	909	919	943	949	1,006	1,014	1,037	1,095	1,203	1,224	1,278	
Fine Gael	Stephanie Regan	3.15	688	699	703	709	710	737	746	747	752	796	808			
Éirígí	Ciarán Heaphey	2.35	512	563	647	650	659	660	678	686	697	716				
Green	Ian Smyth	2.03	442	456	479	485	490	492	515	520	525					
Anti-Austerity Alliance	Pronsias O Conaráin	1.61	351	379	408	411	421	424	483	489						
Direct Democracy	Tom Rooney	1.30	284	309	341	343	352	352								
Fine Gael	Ciarán Byrne	0.88	193	197	199	203	203									
Electorate: 49,839 Valid: 21,819 (43.78%) Spoilt: 408 Quota: 2,182 Turnout: 22,227 (44.60%)

=== Cabra–Finglas ===
Cabra–Finglas: 7 Seats
Party	Candidate	FPv%	Count												
Party	Candidate	FPv%	1	2	3	4	5	6	7	8	9	10	11	12	13
Independent	Cieran Perry	13.47	2,269												
Sinn Féin	Anthony Connaghan	13.10	2,207												
Sinn Féin	Emma Murphy	12.79	2,155												
Sinn Féin	Seamus McGrattan	10.99	1,852	1,893	1,958	1,979	2,012	2,037	2,062	2,082	2,175				
Fianna Fáil	David Costello	7.79	1,313	1,318	1,323	1,354	1,356	1,502	1,523	1,546	1,564	1,565	1,911	2,013	2,162
Labour	Brendan Carr	7.29	1,229	1,242	1,243	1,263	1,264	1,279	1,403	1,520	1,566	1,572	1,643	1,878	2,292
Independent	Teresa Keegan	6.74	1,135	1,171	1,175	1,194	1,197	1,210	1,243	1,321	1,448	1,453	1,518	1,652	1,768
United Left	Bernie Hughes	4.20	707	723	733	753	756	758	767	791	1,027	1,051	1,069	1,171	1,185
Fine Gael	David Rouse	3.82	643	645	645	806	806	818	852	904	917	917	953	1,011	
Labour	John Redmond	3.50	589	591	594	641	643	647	722	763	779	781	794		
People Before Profit	David Gaughran	3.10	522	540	546	551	553	557	580	654					
Fianna Fáil	Paul Anthony Ward	3.00	506	513	514	519	519	689	723	737	742	742			
Green	Tom Duffy	2.72	459	465	467	475	476	482	520						
Fianna Fáil	Darren Lehane	2.62	441	444	445	449	449								
Labour	Declan Meenagh	2.61	440	449	449	457	458	471							
Fine Gael	Jimmy Prendergast	2.28	384	388	390										
Electorate: 37,487 Valid: 16,851 (44.95%) Spoilt: 319 Quota: 2,107 Turnout: 17,170 (45.80%)

=== Clontarf ===
Clontarf: 6 Seats
Party	Candidate	FPv%	Count								
Party	Candidate	FPv%	1	2	3	4	5	6	7	8	9
Independent	Damien O'Farrell	20.56	3,926								
Fianna Fáil	Seán Haughey	12.78	2,440	2,525	2,548	2,691	2,794				
Fianna Fáil	Deirdre Heney	11.39	2,175	2,293	2,316	2,390	2,479	2,510	2,663	2,715	2,809
Fine Gael	Naoise Ó Muirí	10.36	1,979	2,144	2,155	2,365	2,440	2,450	3,042		
Labour	Jane Horgan-Jones	10.17	1,943	2,110	2,131	2,224	2,314	2,320	2,524	2,710	2,833
Sinn Féin	Ciarán O'Moore	9.41	1,798	1,898	1,988	2,013	2,111	2,115	2,136	2,141	2,564
Green	Donna Cooney	4.94	943	1,042	1,063	1,128	1,255	1,258	1,370	1,430	1,704
Fine Gael	Jimmy Bowler	4.91	938	1,000	1,005	1,199	1,235	1,238			
Fine Gael	Pat Crimmins	4.75	907	926	934						
People Before Profit	Pat Doherty	4.26	814	904	1,137	1,164	1,374	1,382	1,418	1,428	
Independent	Philip Grogan	3.80	726	923	1,039	1,071					
Anti-Austerity Alliance	Philip Wright	2.67	510	601							
Electorate: 28,420 Valid: 19,099 (67.20%) Spoilt: 219 Quota: 2,729 Turnout: 19,318 (67.97%)

=== Crumlin–Kimmage ===
Crumlin–Kimmage: 6 Seats
Party	Candidate	FPv%	Count													
Party	Candidate	FPv%	1	2	3	4	5	6	7	8	9	10	11	12	13	14
Sinn Féin	Críona Ní Dhálaigh	13.48	1,528	1,531	1,543	1,568	1,575	1,582	1,592	1,610	1,753					
Sinn Féin	Ray McHugh	12.72	1,442	1,445	1,455	1,470	1,480	1,494	1,500	1,509	1,612	1,671				
People Before Profit	Tina McVeigh	11.56	1,310	1,338	1,363	1,405	1,431	1,452	1,465	1,547	1,662					
United Left	Pat Dunne	9.24	1,047	1,062	1,067	1,085	1,098	1,127	1,134	1,154	1,186	1,189	1,241	1,255	1,316	1,345
Labour	Rebecca Moynihan	8.65	981	994	1,032	1,047	1,054	1,069	1,108	1,218	1,243	1,248	1,518	1,521	1,902	
Fianna Fáil	Catherine Ardagh	7.56	857	861	871	874	1,033	1,049	1,067	1,092	1,111	1,114	1,161	1,161	1,303	1,390
Independent	Paul Dillon	5.73	649	674	678	729	736	871	886	952	995	1,000	1,045	1,053	1,138	1,191
Éirígí	Damien Farrell	4.89	554	557	558	566	571	584	585	589						
Fine Gael	Edel James	4.55	516	525	533	537	550	559	764	813	832	833	968	970		
Labour	Gary Honer	4.48	508	515	560	567	576	585	611	663	677	682				
Green	Sandra Dunne	3.76	426	439	452	466	474	478	489							
Fine Gael	Jason O'Callaghan	3.07	348	354	361	365	370	376								
Fianna Fáil	Aoife Donoghue	2.58	293	294	299	301										
Independent	Tony Byrne	2.36	267	274	282	302	310									
Independent	John J. O'Donovan	1.94	220	254	260											
Labour	John Gallagher	1.78	202	203												
Independent	Christian Hayden	1.03	117													
Independent	Lech Szczecinski	0.62	70													
Electorate: 29,575 Valid: 11,335 (38.33%) Spoilt: 246 Quota: 1,620 Turnout: 11,581 (39.16%)

=== North Inner City ===
North Inner City: 8 Seats
Party	Candidate	FPv%	Count												
Party	Candidate	FPv%	1	2	3	4	5	6	7	8	9	10	11	12	13
Sinn Féin	Janice Boylan	13.52	1,393												
Independent	Christy Burke	12.01	1,238												
Independent	Nial Ring	9.62	991	995	1,009	1,013	1,018	1,021	1,096	1,109	1,172				
Sinn Féin	Jonathan Dowdall	7.09	731	865	886	891	891	895	917	918	957	1,060	1,094	1,113	1,114
Green	Ciarán Cuffe	7.03	724	733	737	740	753	762	767	772	829	858	933	1,098	1,100
Independent	Gary Gannon	7.19	741	752	766	784	805	811	837	843	904	987	1,039	1,073	1,079
Fine Gael	Ray McAdam	5.88	606	610	611	613	621	633	635	786	804	815	868	1,030	1,032
Independent	Eilis Ryan	6.09	628	635	638	647	660	663	681	687	745	771	840	940	950
Sinn Féin	Gaye Fagan	7.10	732	786	799	804	804	808	825	827	847	873	909	941	947
Labour	Lucy McRoberts	4.10	422	423	423	425	427	510	511	534	556	672	703		
Fianna Fáil	Brian Mohan	4.95	510	513	515	516	522	528	533	541	559	570			
Labour	Darryl O'Callaghan	4.04	416	422	429	429	429	447	454	462	490				
Independent	Mel MacGiobúin	3.96	408	413	420	422	429	434	445	447					
Fine Gael	Patrick Martin	2.21	228	229	230	232	234	241	251						
Independent	Malachy Steenson	2.11	217	218	220	224	224	224							
Labour	Padraig McLoughlin	1.57	162	164	165	166	167								
Independent	Rafal Kornatka	0.88	91	92	93	98									
Independent	Eva de Winter	0.38	39	44	46										
Independent	Philip Lee	0.26	27	27	27										
Electorate: 28,900 Valid: 10,304 (35.65%) Spoilt: 243 Quota: 1,145 Turnout: 10,547 (36.49%)

=== Pembroke–South Dock ===
Pembroke–South Dock: 8 Seats
Party	Candidate	FPv%	Count										
Party	Candidate	FPv%	1	2	3	4	5	6	7	8	9	10	11
Sinn Féin	Chris Andrews	15.07	2,081										
Fianna Fáil	Frank Kennedy	10.05	1,388	1,407	1,408	1,434	1,440	1,493	1,495	1,543			
Labour	Dermot Lacey	9.72	1,343	1,361	1,365	1,380	1,469	1,495	1,497	1,830			
Independent	Mannix Flynn	9.64	1,331	1,453	1,478	1,569							
Green	Claire Byrne	7.75	1,071	1,132	1,148	1,172	1,216	1,291	1,299	1,353	1,424	1,466	1,642
Fine Gael	Paddy McCartan	7.39	1,021	1,032	1,033	1,041	1,051	1,068	1,068	1,093	1,140	1,306	1,393
Fine Gael	Kieran Binchy	7.30	1,008	1,015	1,017	1,025	1,062	1,074	1,074	1,114	1,141	1,293	1,376
People Before Profit	Sonya Stapleton	5.60	773	927	938	966	977	1,155	1,170	1,203	1,231	1,246	1,332
Fianna Fáil	Lorraine Clifford	5.41	747	781	783	790	808	838	840	865	874	918	
Fine Gael	Linda O'Shea-Farren	4.77	659	661	662	665	671	691	691	706	724		
Fine Gael	Nadine Meisonnave	4.67	645	647	651	662	673	696	698	734	760	1,007	1,117
Independent	Anne Maree Quinn	3.70	511	541	555	606	611						
Labour	James Humphreys	3.66	506	523	528	539	653	683	686				
Labour	Gerry Ashe	2.43	336	354	363	369							
Independent	Wayne Flanagan-Tobin	1.89	261	289	326								
Independent	Marcin Czechowicz	0.32	44	59									
Independent	Christian Hayden	0.31	43	50									
Independent	Galen MacCaba	0.31	43	44									
Electorate: 39,209 Valid: 13,811 (35.22%) Spoilt: 202 Quota: 1,535 Turnout: 14,013 (35.74%)

=== Rathgar–Rathmines ===
Rathgar–Rathmines: 6 Seats
Party	Candidate	FPv%	Count										
Party	Candidate	FPv%	1	2	3	4	5	6	7	8	9	10	11
Green	Patrick Costello	12.85	1,647	1,707	1,742	1,745	1,892						
Fine Gael	Kate O'Connell	12.60	1,615	1,636	1,958								
Labour	Mary Freehill	9.43	1,209	1,239	1,296	1,303	1,356	1,370	1,658	1,727	2,221		
Sinn Féin	Dominic MacConraoi	8.34	1,069	1,086	1,093	1,094	1,294	1,313	1,334	1,387	1,435	1,480	1,488
Fianna Fáil	Jim O'Callaghan	8.24	1,056	1,070	1,082	1,084	1,101	1,102	1,234	1,845			
Fine Gael	Paddy Smyth	8.24	1,056	1,065	1,222	1,311	1,322	1,322	1,473	1,534	1,714	1,879	
Fianna Fáil	Daniel Donnelly	7.50	961	981	1,001	1,004	1,014	1,015	1,035				
Labour	Oisín Quinn	6.40	820	825	840	849	869	873					
Independent	Ruairi McGinley	6.36	815	893	928	932	1,108	1,126	1,163	1,257	1,426	1,536	1,575
Labour	Henry Upton	5.96	764	782	841	847	883	886	1,037	1,088			
People Before Profit	Kim O'Donnell	5.69	730	786	793	795							
Fine Gael	Samantha Long	5.62	721	732									
Independent	Ethna Tinney	2.78	356										
Electorate: 32,122 Valid: 12,819 (39.91%) Spoilt: 157 Quota: 1,832 Turnout: 12,976 (40.40%)

== Changes ==
=== Co-options ===
Party	Outgoing	LEA	Reason	Date	Co-optee
Sinn Féin	Jonathan Dowdall	North Inner City	Health reasons.	March 2015	Gaye Fagan
Fine Gael	Noel Rock	Ballymun	Elected to the 32nd Dáil at the 2016 general election.	26 February 2016	Norma Sammon
Sinn Féin	Denise Mitchell	Beaumont–Donaghmede	Elected to the 32nd Dáil at the 2016 general election.	26 February 2016	Edel Moran
Fianna Fáil	Seán Haughey	Clontarf	Elected to the 32nd Dáil at the 2016 general election.	26 February 2016	Sean Paul Mahon
Fine Gael	Kate O'Connell	Rathgar–Rathmines	Elected to the 32nd Dáil at the 2016 general election.	26 February 2016	Anne Feeney
Fianna Fáil	Jim O'Callaghan	Rathgar–Rathmines	Elected to the 32nd Dáil at the 2016 general election.	26 February 2016	Clare O'Connor
People Before Profit	Bríd Smith	Ballyfermot–Drimnagh	Elected to the 32nd Dáil at the 2016 general election.	26 February 2016	Hazel De Nortúin
Fianna Fáil	Catherine Ardagh	Crumlin–Kimmage	Elected to 25th Seanad at the 2016 Seanad election.	26 February 2016	Michael Mullooly

=== Changes in affiliation ===
Name	LEA	Elected as	New affiliation	Date
Eilis Ryan	North Inner City	Independent	Workers' Party	21 January 2015
Gary Gannon	North Inner City	Independent	Social Democrats	15 July 2015
Sonya Stapleton	Pembroke–South Dock	People Before Profit	Independent	February 2016
Noeleen Reilly	Ballymun	Sinn Féin	Independent	5 February 2016
John Lyons	Beaumont–Donaghmede	People Before Profit	Independent Left	7 January 2019
