= 2019 Dublin City Council election =

Part of the 2019 Irish local elections

- 24 May 2019

All 63 seats on Dublin City Council 32 seats needed for a majority
	First party	Second party	Third party
Party	Fianna Fáil	Green	Fine Gael
Seats won	11	10	9
Seat change	▲2	▲7	▲1
	Fourth party	Fifth party	Sixth party
Party	Sinn Féin	Labour	Social Democrats
Seats won	8	8	5
Seat change	▼8	Steady	▲5
	Seventh party	Eighth party	Ninth party
Party	People Before Profit	Inds. 4 Change	Independent Left
Seats won	2	1	1
Seat change	▼3	▲1	▲1
- First preference vote and seat totals by local electoral area. As this is a STV election, seat totals are determined by popular vote and preferences in each local electoral area.
Council control before election
Sinn Féin
Labour Party
Green Party
Council control after election
Fianna Fáil
Green Party
Labour Party
Social Democrats

An election to all 63 seats on Dublin City Council took place on 24 May 2019 as part of the 2019 Irish local elections. Dublin was divided into 11 local electoral areas (LEAs) to elect councillors for a five-year term of office on the electoral system of proportional representation by means of the single transferable vote (PR-STV).

== Boundary changes ==
At the 2014 Dublin City Council election, there were nine LEAs each electing between six and nine councillors. Following the recommendations of the Local Area Boundary Committee Report in June 2018, there were eleven LEAs each electing between five and seven councillors.

== Overview ==
Sinn Féin lost eight seats to return with eight councillors, going from being the largest party to the fourth largest. Fianna Fáil won eleven seats, an increase of two, to become the largest party on the council for the first time since 1999. The Green Party became the second largest party on the council for the first time going from three to ten councillors, making the largest gains of any party and winning a seat in every LEA they contested there. Labour returned with eight councillors the same as they did five years previous.

== Results by party ==
Party	Seats	±	1st pref	FPv%	±%
Fianna Fáil	11	▲2	25,011	18.14	▲3.67
Green	10	▲7	20,800	15.09	▲10.01
Fine Gael	9	▲1	18,801	13.64	▼0.34
Sinn Féin	8	▼8	16,533	11.99	▼12.23
Labour	8	Steady	14,112	10.24	▼2.47
Social Democrats	5	▲5	9,771	7.09	New
People Before Profit	2	▼3	6,184	4.49	▼2.43
Inds. 4 Change	1	▲1	3,496	2.54	New
Independent Left	1	▲1	1,808	1.31	New
Solidarity	0	▼1	1,251	0.91	▼0.56
Éirígí	0	Steady	916	0.66	▼0.58
Workers' Party	0	Steady	881	0.64	▲0.38
Aontú	0	Steady	354	0.26	New
Renua	0	Steady	312	0.23	New
United Left	0	▼1	—N/a	—N/a	—N/a
Independent	8	▼4	17,590	12.76	▼4.99
Total	63	Steady	137,847	100.00	

Outgoing Councillor Ellis Ryan was elected in 2014 in the North Inner City as an Independent but subsequently joined the Workers' Party.

Outgoing Councillor Pat Dunne was elected in 2014 in Crumlin–Kimmage as a United Left candidate but was elected as an Independents 4 Change candidate in this election.

Outgoing Councillor John Lyons was a candidate for Independent Left which is an unregistered political party so appeared on the ballot paper as a non-party independent.

== Results by local electoral area ==
*: Outgoing councillor elected in 2014.
†: Outgoing councillor coopted subsequent to the 2014 election.

=== Artane–Whitehall ===
Artane–Whitehall: 6 seats
Party	Candidate	FPv%	Count						
Party	Candidate	FPv%	1	2	3	4	5	6	7
Social Democrats	Patricia Roe	15.09%	1,951						
Sinn Féin	Larry O'Toole	13.59%	1,757	1,760	1,848				
Fianna Fáil	Racheal Batten	10.54%	1,362	1,379	1,385	1,440	1,527	1,603	1,634
Labour	Alison Gilliland	9.87%	1,276	1,307	1,318	1,396	1,525	1,675	1,771
Fine Gael	Declan Flanagan	9.78%	1,264	1,274	1,277	1,361	1,450	1,482	1,498
Independent Left	John Lyons	9.64%	1,246	1,264	1,398	1,546	1,836	2,232	
Fianna Fáil	Sean Paul Mahon	8.51%	1,100	1,106	1,113	1,160	1,245	1,313	1,340
Sinn Féin	Edel Moran	8.22%	1,063	1,070	1,123	1,165	1,239		
Independent	Paddy Bourke	6.00%	776	781	802	955			
Independent	Paul Clarke	5.64%	729	735	756				
Éirígí	Ciarán Heaphey	3.13%	404	405					
Electorate: 34,355 Valid: 12,928 Spoilt: 588 (4.4%) Quota: 1,847 Turnout: 13,516 (39.3%)

Outgoing Councillor John Lyons was a candidate for Independent Left which is an unregistered political party so appeared on the ballot paper as a non-party independent.

=== Ballyfermot–Drimnagh ===
Ballyfermot–Drimnagh: 5 seats
Party	Candidate	FPv%	Count							
Party	Candidate	FPv%	1	2	3	4	5	6	7	8
Sinn Féin	Daithí Doolan	15.06%	1,628	1,630	1,675	1,683	1,710	2,205		
People Before Profit	Hazel De Nortúin	12.79%	1,383	1,390	1,426	1,443	1,478	1,543	1,673	2,103
Independent	Vincent Jackson	12.45%	1,346	1,384	1,463	1,482	1,542	1,599	1,636	1,761
Green	Sophie Nicoullaud (Note: See change below.)	12.22%	1,321	1,328	1,357	1,410	1,560	1,606	1,649	1,785
Fianna Fáil	Daithí de Róiste	10.50%	1,135	1,144	1,165	1,297	1,379	1,410	1,434	1,492
Labour	Michael O'Sullivan	8.75%	946	956	970	1,042	1,158	1,187	1,207	1,322
Inds. 4 Change	Nicky Uzell	7.58%	820	824	860	884	937	1,008	1,096	
Sinn Féin	Greg Kelly	7.23%	782	791	807	821	843			
Fine Gael	Obi Ekoba	5.42%	586	604	613	643				
Fianna Fáil	Eoin Neylon	3.63%	392	397	405					
Independent	Richard Murray	3.20%	346	356						
Independent	Robert Michael Foley	1.17%	126							
Electorate: 30,798 Valid: 10,811 Spoilt: 413 (3.7%) Quota: 1,802 Turnout: 11,224 (36.4%)

=== Ballymun–Finglas ===
Ballymun–Finglas: 6 seats
Party	Candidate	FPv%	Count													
Party	Candidate	FPv%	1	2	3	4	5	6	7	8	9	10	11	12	13	14
Fianna Fáil	Paul McAuliffe	17.41%	2,300													
Independent	Noeleen Reilly	13.18%	1,741	1,767	1,809	1,846	1,899	1,899								
Fianna Fáil	Keith Connolly	9.68%	1,279	1,489	1,506	1,529	1,566	1,571	1,572	1,593	1,600	1,619	1,688	1,835	1,963	
Social Democrats	Mary Callaghan	8.72%	1,152	1,184	1,190	1,197	1,199	1,226	1,227	1,232	1,240	1,308	1,387	1,509	1,724	1,752
Green	Caroline Conroy	7.45%	985	1,009	1,013	1,032	1,034	1,063	1,063	1,070	1,080	1,143	1,222	1,404	1,751	1,781
Sinn Féin	Anthony Conaghan	6.58%	870	880	888	896	923	933	934	1,067	1,189	1,212	1,320	1,342	1,386	1,396
Sinn Féin	Cathleen Carney Boud	6.24%	825	835	837	845	861	885	886	987	1,155	1,198	1,285	1,320	1,378	1,385
Labour	Andrew Montague	5.84%	772	798	800	805	808	827	827	834	857	920	967	1,134		
Fine Gael	Sean Tyrrell	5.72%	756	795	802	808	811	818	818	824	829	849	871			
Inds. 4 Change	Bernie Hughes	3.93%	519	526	540	571	618	666	672	700	711	801				
People Before Profit	Andrew Keegan	2.86%	378	383	386	396	400	463	464	474	491					
Sinn Féin	Martin Matthews	2.82%	372	377	385	385	390	402	402	442						
Sinn Féin	Rose Emmett	2.72%	360	364	371	375	387	392	392							
Workers' Party	Cathie Shiels	2.11%	279	283	289	294	303									
Independent	Diarmuid Mac Dubhghlais	1.98%	261	263	281	293										
Independent	Linda Greene	1.40%	185	189	205											
Independent	Lucy O'Connor	1.36%	180	184												
Electorate: 36,735 Valid: 13,214 Spoilt: 627 (4.5%) Quota: 1,888 Turnout: 13,841 (37.7%)

=== Cabra–Glasnevin ===
Cabra–Glasnevin: 7 seats
Party	Candidate	FPv%	Count														
Party	Candidate	FPv%	1	2	3	4	5	6	7	8	9	10	11	12	13	14	15
Fianna Fáil	Mary Fitzpatrick	19.87%	3,218														
Green	Neasa Hourigan	13.36%	2,163														
Social Democrats	Gary Gannon	10.26%	1,662	1,751	1,786	1,800	1,804	1,854	1,875	2,017	2,048						
Independent	Cieran Perry	9.16%	1,483	1,604	1,609	1,628	1,641	1,674	1,758	1,826	1,893	1,896	1,955	2,107			
Sinn Féin	Seamas McGrattan	6.96%	1,127	1,190	1,192	1,195	1,197	1,204	1,213	1,256	1,608	1,618	1,665	1,704	1,716	1,739	1,837
Fine Gael	Colm O'Rourke	5.08%	823	894	901	901	911	914	931	935	942	942	1,015	1,062	1,065	1,609	1,743
Labour	Áine Clancy	4.99%	808	918	936	941	944	952	969	992	998	1,000	1,098	1,164	1,176	1,284	1,485
Labour	Marie Sherlock	4.77%	773	817	833	840	842	853	872	891	901	902	946	1,100	1,130	1,213	1,491
Fine Gael	Siobhan Shovlin	4.64%	751	831	839	840	851	861	910	916	921	922	991	1,034	1,038		
Independent	Sean McCabe	3.98%	645	669	680	684	692	739	766	822	835	837	889				
Labour	Declan Meenagh	3.90%	632	717	730	736	740	774	805	842	865	869	940	1,084	1,105	1,176	
Sinn Féin	Paul O'Farrell	3.01%	488	513	514	522	524	530	535	562							
Solidarity	Rita Harrold	2.59%	419	439	445	474	475	499	515								
Fianna Fáil	Hannah Lemass	2.13%	345	764	769	771	776	788	804	821	827	827					
Independent	Stephen O'Loughlin	2.00%	324	342	345	345	360	371									
Inds. 4 Change	Micheál Kelliher	1.54%	249	263	269	286	291										
Independent	Sarah Louise Mulligan	1.04%	168	173	174	176											
Workers' Party	Cormac Newton	0.72%	117	122	123												
Electorate: 36,988 Valid: 16,195 Spoilt: 391 (2.4%) Quota: 2,025 Turnout: 16,586 (44.8%)

=== Clontarf ===
Clontarf: 6 seats
Party	Candidate	FPv%	Count								
Party	Candidate	FPv%	1	2	3	4	5	6	7	8	9
Independent	Damian O'Farrell	18.01%	3,545								
Green	Donna Cooney	14.43%	2,840								
Fianna Fáil	Deirdre Heney	13.61%	2,680	2,793	2,795	2,868					
Fine Gael	Naoise Ó Muirí	10.86%	2,139	2,273	2,276	2,291	2,312	2,375	3,316		
Labour	Jane Horgan-Jones	10.46%	2,059	2,180	2,188	2,226	2,314	2,457	2,690	2,965	
Fianna Fáil	Cathal Haughey	8.29%	1,633	1,684	1,685	1,759	1,832	1,886	2,090	2,242	2,309
Fine Gael	Jeff Johnston	7.73%	1,522	1,577	1,579	1,598	1,638	1,666			
Social Democrats	Catherine Stocker	6.83%	1,344	1,436	1,443	1,486	1,638	2,156	2,247	2,323	2,399
People Before Profit	Bernard Mulvany	4.05%	798	870	872	955	1,190				
Sinn Féin	Ciaran O'Moore	3.67%	722	754	755	781					
Independent	Michael Paul Burke	2.06%	406	468	469						
Electorate: 40,888 Valid: 19,688 Spoilt: 458 (1.1%) Quota: 2,813 Turnout: 20,146 (49.3%)

=== Donaghmede ===
Donaghmede: 5 seats
Party	Candidate	FPv%	Count								
Party	Candidate	FPv%	1	2	3	4	5	6	7	8	9
Fianna Fáil	Tom Brabazon	16.39%	2,051	2,089							
Fianna Fáil	Daryl Barron	12.30%	1,539	1,560	1,572	1,574	1,609	1,653	1,734	1,861	1,925
Sinn Féin	Mícheál Mac Donncha	11.91%	1,490	1,508	1,528	1,528	1,628	1,633	1,680	1,734	2,047
Fine Gael	Terence Flanagan	9.64%	1,206	1,270	1,279	1,280	1,299	1,483	1,817	2,012	2,064
Green	Lawrence Hemmings	8.21%	1,027	1,055	1,081	1,081	1,146	1,191	1,289	1,565	1,764
Social Democrats	Paddy Monahan	7.65%	957	968	989	989	1,060	1,115	1,165	1,361	1,677
Labour	Shane Folan	6.79%	850	862	876	876	932	985	1,111		
Solidarity	Michael O'Brien	6.65%	832	848	1,040	1,040	1,172	1,182	1,222	1,310	
Fine Gael	Maria Mulvany	5.12%	641	644	653	653	670				
Fine Gael	Suzanne McDonnell	5.03%	629	634	647	647	683	911			
Independent Left	Niamh McDonald	4.49%	562	597	645	645					
People Before Profit	Jo Tully	3.01%	377	397							
Aontú	Proinsias O Conaráin	2.83%	354								
Electorate: 29,396 Valid: 12,515 Spoilt: 382 (3.1%) Quota: 2,086 Turnout: 12,897 (43.9%)

Niamh McDonald was a candidate for Independent Left which is an unregistered political party so appeared on the ballot paper as a non-party independent.

=== Kimmage–Rathmines ===
Kimmage–Rathmines: 6 seats
Party	Candidate	FPv%	Count								
Party	Candidate	FPv%	1	2	3	4	5	6	7	8	9
Green	Patrick Costello	20.37%	3,283								
Labour	Mary Freehill	11.08%	1,786	1,988	2,002	2,009	2,094	2,182	2,306		
Inds. 4 Change	Pat Dunne	10.43%	1,680	1,707	1,728	1,840	1,857	1,861	1,918	2,054	2,432
Fine Gael	Anne Feeney	8.98%	1,447	1,553	1,574	1,574	1,652	2,178	2,305		
Social Democrats	Tara Deacy	7.42%	1,196	1,500	1,519	1,536	1,577	1,610	1,759	1,917	2,236
Fianna Fáil	Deirdre Conroy	6.61%	1,065	1,113	1,136	1,147	1,478	1,553	1,623	1,878	1,926
People Before Profit	Peter Dooley	5.80%	935	1,006	1,021	1,052	1,074	1,085	1,149	1,206	
Independent	Ruari McGinley	4.87%	785	821	875	895	960	993	1,130		
Fianna Fáil	Michael Mullooly	4.65%	750	773	800	812					
Fine Gael	Patrick Kinsella	4.57%	763	812	821	821	860				
Independent	Samantha Long	4.56%	734	787	845	858	891	915			
Sinn Féin	Fearghal Donnelly	4.47%	720	747	755	1,137	1,159	1,164	1,201	1,248	1,416
Sinn Féin	Ray McHugh	3.94%	635	640	643						
Independent	Garrett McCafferty	1.20%	193	204							
Independent	Sarah Lipsett	0.88%	141	160							
Electorate: 40,814 Valid: 16,113 Spoilt: 484 (2.9%) Quota: 2,302 Turnout: 16,597 (40.7%)

=== North Inner City ===
North Inner City: 7 seats
Party	Candidate	FPv%	Count														
Party	Candidate	FPv%	1	2	3	4	5	6	7	8	9	10	11	12	13	14	15
Green	Ciarán Cuffe	14.71%	1,386														
Independent	Christy Burke	11.73%	1,105	1,113	1,113	1,115	1,134	1,148	1,172	1,187							
Labour	Joe Costello	10.03%	945	995	995	997	1,003	1,012	1,018	1,051	1,071	1,171	1,173	1,245			
Fine Gael	Ray McAdam	8.65%	815	836	836	836	838	845	847	866	873	886	886	942	953	969	977
Independent	Nial Ring	8.11%	764	773	774	775	793	811	828	850	878	895	897	947	951	980	1,056
Sinn Féin	Janice Boylan	7.02%	661	666	666	667	670	670	736	745	754	770	771	793	801	902	1,155
Independent	Anthony Flynn	6.45%	608	613	614	614	638	648	652	657	682	705	706	718	721	772	950
Sinn Féin	Belinda Nugent	5.70%	537	539	539	539	543	549	615	621	634	644	644	655	655	680	
Workers' Party	Éilis Ryan	5.15%	485	506	508	508	513	516	522	526	539	650	651	669	675	875	904
People Before Profit	Gillian Brien	4.45%	419	436	436	437	448	451	454	465	483	566	566	594	600		
Fianna Fáil	Imran Khursid	4.13%	389	397	399	403	406	425	428	515	526	547	549				
Social Democrats	Ellie Kisyombe	3.31%	312	342	344	346	349	350	350	360	464						
Social Democrats	Carol Deans	2.63%	248	269	269	269	276	284	288	295							
Fianna Fáil	Denise McMorrow	2.47%	233	237	238	239	239	274	275								
Sinn Féin	Declan Hallissey	2.24%	211	212	212	212	213	214									
Fianna Fáil	Brian Mohan	1.49%	140	141	141	141	144										
Independent	Joseph McGucken	0.77%	73	74	74	77											
Independent	Neil Armstrong	0.36%	34	34	35	35											
Independent	Marcin Czechowicz	0.25%	24	26	26	27											
Independent	Marius Marosan	0.22%	21	22	23												
Independent	S.G. Raja Sekhar Reddy	0.13%	12	13													
Electorate: 27,425 Valid: 9,422 Spoilt: 266 (2.8%) Quota: 1,178 Turnout: 9,688 (35.3%)

=== Pembroke ===
Pembroke: 5 seats
Party	Candidate	FPv%	Count						
Party	Candidate	FPv%	1	2	3	4	5	6	7
Green	Hazel Chu	33.07%	4,069						
Fine Gael	James Geoghegan	15.69%	1,931	2,322					
Labour	Dermot Lacey	14.55%	1,790	2,372					
Fine Gael	Paddy McCartan	11.30%	1,391	1,554	1,626	1,714	1,728	1,773	1,906
Fianna Fáil	Claire O'Connor	11.17%	1,374	1,573	1,626	1,689	1,714	1,776	2,059
Fine Gael	Linda O'Shea Farren	6.86%	844	1,025	1,084	1,173	1,178	1,215	1,351
People Before Profit	Síomha Ní Aonghusa	4.02%	495	804	886	903	1,014	1,180	
Sinn Féin	Larry Kenna	1.71%	210	251	262	262			
Independent	Simon Cox	1.63%	201	353	397	411	446		
Electorate: 30,023 Valid: 12,305 Spoilt: 293 (2.3%) Quota: 2,051 Turnout: 12,598 (42.0%)

=== South East Inner City ===
South East Inner City: 5 seats
Party	Candidate	FPv%	Count									
Party	Candidate	FPv%	1	2	3	4	5	6	7	8	9	10
Green	Claire Byrne	28.59%	1,961									
Sinn Féin	Chris Andrews	14.86%	1,019	1,061	1,066	1,217						
Fine Gael	Danny Byrne	9.84%	675	800	822	822	822	871	884	956	1,009	1,018
Labour	Kevin Donoghue	8.52%	584	770	778	791	803	822	856	953	1,183	
Independent	Mannix Flynn	7.99%	548	636	663	670	677	702	750	820	927	941
People Before Profit	Annette Mooney	6.72%	461	507	514	535	553	575	668	755	913	929
Fianna Fáil	Elizabeth Watson	5.45%	374	398	414	426	436	565	589			
Social Democrats	Sarah Durcan	4.97%	341	559	561	567	576	588	623	659		
Sinn Féin	Susan Gregg Farrell	3.75%	257	266	268							
Fianna Fáil	Maria Bohan	3.47%	238	264	279	283	290					
Inds. 4 Change	Sonya Stapleton	3.32%	228	270	287	307	317	327				
Renua	Jacqui Gilbourne	2.51%	172	183								
Electorate: 21,351 Valid: 6,858 Spoilt: 186 (2.6%) Quota: 1,144 Turnout: 7,044 (33.0%)

=== South West Inner City ===
South West Inner City: 5 seats
Party	Candidate	FPv%	Count					
Party	Candidate	FPv%	1	2	3	4	5	6
Green	Michael Pidgeon	22.63%	1,765					
Labour	Rebecca Moynihan	11.43%	891	1,032	1,051	1,077	1,116	1,368
People Before Profit	Tina MacVeigh	12.03%	938	1,022	1,044	1,197	1,233	1,286
Fianna Fáil	Michael Watters	10.73%	837	875	911	939	1,131	1,329
Sinn Féin	Críona Ní Dhálaigh	10.25%	799	816	832	1,008	1,029	1,057
Fine Gael	Eoghan Howe	8.27%	645	691	703	711	759	
Social Democrats	Jen Cummins	7.80%	608	712	736	779	824	896
Fianna Fáil	Ammar Ali	7.40%	577	594	618	630		
Éirígí	Damien Farrell	6.57%	512	515	537			
Renua	Tony Murray	1.80%	140	147				
Independent	Patrick Coyne	1.10%	86	94				
Electorate: 21,686 Valid: 7,798 Spoilt: 280 (3.5%) Quota: 1,300 Turnout: 8,078 (37.2%)

== Results by gender ==
2019 Dublin City Council election Candidates by gender
Gender	Number of candidates	% of candidates	Elected councillors	% of councillors
Men	89	59.3%	37	58.7%
Women	61	40.7%	26	41.3%
TOTAL	150		63	

== Changes ==
=== Co-options ===
Party	Outgoing	LEA	Reason	Date	Co-optee
Green	Ciarán Cuffe	North Inner City	Elected for Dublin at the European Parliament election	2 September 2019	Janet Horner
Sinn Féin	Chris Andrews	South East Inner City	Elected to 33rd Dáil at the 2020 general election	24 February 2020	Daniel Ceitinn
Green	Patrick Costello	Kimmage–Rathmines	Elected to 33rd Dáil at the 2020 general election	February 2020	Carolyn Moore
Green	Neasa Hourigan	Cabra–Glasnevin	Elected to 33rd Dáil at the 2020 general election	24 February 2020	Darcy Lonergan
Social Democrats	Gary Gannon	Cabra–Glasnevin	Elected to 33rd Dáil at the 2020 general election	24 February 2020	Cat O'Driscoll
Fianna Fáil	Paul McAuliffe	Ballymun–Finglas	Elected to 33rd Dáil at the 2020 general election	24 February 2020	Briege MacOscar
Labour	Rebecca Moynihan	South West Inner City	Elected to 26th Seanad at the 2020 Seanad election	25 May 2020	Darragh Moriarty
Labour	Marie Sherlock	Cabra–Glasnevin	Elected to 26th Seanad at the 2020 Seanad election	June 2020	Declan Meenagh
Fianna Fáil	Mary Fitzpatrick	Cabra–Glasnevin	Nominated by the Taoiseach to 26th Seanad	June 2020	Eimer McCormack
Green	Lawrence Hemmings	Donaghmede	Resignation	June 2020	Dearbháil Butler
Sinn Féin	Críona Ní Dhálaigh	South West Inner City	Resignation	September 2020	Máire Devine
Independent	Anthony Flynn	North Inner City	Death	18 August 2021	None
PBP–Solidarity	Tina MacVeigh	South West Inner City	Temporary leave of absence	May 2022	Kelsey May Daly
Labour	Mary Freehill	Kimmage–Rathmines	Temporary leave of absence	May 2023	Fiona Connelly
Labour	Joe Costello	North Inner City	Resignation	July 2023	Deborah Byrne

=== Changes in affiliation ===
Name	LEA	Elected as	New affiliation	Date
Sophie Nicoullaud	Ballyfermot–Drimnagh	Green	Independent	19 January 2021
Sophie Nicoullaud	Ballyfermot–Drimnagh	Independent	Right to Change	2022
Pat Dunne	Kimmage–Rathmines	Inds. 4 Change	Right to Change	2022

== Sources ==
- "Local Elections 2019: Results, Transfer of Votes and Statistics" (PDF). Department of Housing, Planning and Local Government (DHPLG). pp. 24–39. Archived from the original (PDF) on 10 June 2020.
- "Dublin City Council: 2019 Local Election". IrelandElection.com.
