= 2009 Dublin City Council election =

Part of the 2009 Irish local elections

- 5 June 2009

52 seats on Dublin City Council
	First party	Second party	Third party
Party	Labour	Fine Gael	Sinn Féin
Seats won	19	12	7
Seat change	▲3	▲3	▼3
	Fourth party	Fifth party	Sixth party
Party	Fianna Fáil	People Before Profit	Green
Seats won	6	2	0
Seat change	▼6	▲2	▼1
	Seventh party	Eighth party
Party	Progressive Democrats	Independent
Seats won	0	6
Seat change	▼1	▲3
- Map showing the area of Dublin City Council
Council control before election
Labour Party
Fine Gael
Council control after election
Labour Party
Fine Gael

An election to Dublin City Council took place on 5 June 2009 as part of that year's Irish local elections. 52 councillors were elected from eleven local electoral areas (LEAs) for a five-year term of office on the electoral system of proportional representation by means of the single transferable vote (PR-STV).

== Results by party ==
Party	Seats	±	First Pref. votes	FPv%	±%
Labour	19	▲3	47,297	29.40	▲8.83
Fine Gael	12	▲3	30,093	18.70	▲1.66
Sinn Féin	7	▼3	20,385	12.67	▼5.95
Fianna Fáil	6	▼6	29,131	18.10	▼4.64
People Before Profit	2	▲2	6,703	4.17	▲2.51
Green	0	▼1	5,695	3.54	▼2.92
Workers' Party	0	0	1,271	0.79	▼0.10
Christian Solidarity	0	0	241	0.15	▲0.03
Progressive Democrats	0	▼1	N/A	N/A	N/A
Independent	6	▲3	20,085	12.48	▲4.58
Totals	52	0	160,901	100.00	—

== Results by local electoral area ==
=== Artane-Whitehall ===
Artane-Whitehall - 5 seats
Party	Candidate	FPv%	Count							
Party	Candidate	FPv%	1	2	3	4	5	6	7	8
Sinn Féin	Larry O'Toole*	16.62	2,702	2,819						
Labour	Andrew Montague*	15.60	2,535	2,640	2,647	2,776				
Fine Gael	Declan Flanagan*	14.58	2,370	2,426	2,427	2,506	2,669	2,678	2,679	2,905
Labour	Paddy Bourke*	11.24	1,827	1,913	1,921	2,036	2,676	2,713		
Fianna Fáil	Seán Paul Mahon*	8.90	1,447	1,462	1,466	1,507	1,542	1,543	1,543	
Fianna Fáil	Julia Carmichael*	8.86	1,440	1,460	1,462	1,503	1,540	1,544	1,545	2,515
Fine Gael	Noel Rock	7.90	1,284	1,337	1,341	1,408	1,542	1,558	1,560	1,659
Labour	Sinead Seery	5.96	968	1,058	1,074	1,222				
Sinn Féin	Denise Mitchell	5.73	931	1,002	1,043					
People Before Profit	Martin O'Sullivan	2.41	391							
Independent	Anna Harvey	2.20	358							
Electorate: 32,989 Valid: 16,253 (49.27%) Spoilt: 309 Quota: 2,709 Turnout: 16,562 (50.20%)

=== Ballyfermot-Drimnagh ===
Ballyfermot-Drimnagh - 4 seats
Party	Candidate	FPv%	Count							
Party	Candidate	FPv%	1	2	3	4	5	6	7	8
Labour	Michael Conaghan*	19.41	2,341	2,377	2,430					
People Before Profit	Bríd Smith	18.80	2,269	2,307	2,375	2,392	2,500			
Independent	Vincent Jackson*	15.92	1,922	1,949	1,982	2,040	2,197	2,225	2,301	2,556
Sinn Féin	Louise Minihan*	13.67	1,650	1,661	1,712	1,727	1,820	1,828	1,892	2,021
Fine Gael	Philip Nolan	6.49	783	797	806	822	923	930	1,496	1,692
Fine Gael	Peter O'Neill	6.32	763	797	808	816	878	886		
Fianna Fáil	David Gaynor	5.72	691	701	712	1,067	1,108	1,112	1,149	
Labour	Paul Comiskey-O'Keeffe	5.13	619	645	669	686				
Fianna Fáil	Ben Doyle	4.12	497	507	516					
Workers' Party	Andrew McGuinness	2.46	297	304						
Green	Stephen Wall	1.97	238							
Electorate: 27,942 Valid: 12,070 (43.20%) Spoilt: 230 Quota: 2,415 Turnout: 12,300 (44.02%)

=== Ballymun-Finglas ===
Ballymun-Finglas - 5 seats
Party	Candidate	FPv%	Count								
Party	Candidate	FPv%	1	2	3	4	5	6	7	8	9
Labour	John Lyons*	22.22	3,721								
Sinn Féin	Dessie Ellis*	19.49	3,263								
Fine Gael	Bill Tormey*	12.77	2,139	2,267	2,312	2,343	2,374	2,414	2,471	2,615	2,918
Labour	John Redmond	9.34	1,564	1,989	2,040	2,058	2,107	2,205	2,348	2,440	2,808
Sinn Féin	Ray Corcoran*	7.11	1,190	1,278	1,526	1,538	1,557	1,661	1,740	1,782	1,943
Fianna Fáil	Paul McAuliffe	6.83	1,144	1,187	1,203	1,348	1,366	1,376	1,390	2,103	2,349
Fianna Fáil	Liam Kelly*	6.66	1,116	1,144	1,162	1,254	1,258	1,272	1,282		
Independent	Conor Sludds	6.63	1,110	1,188	1,210	1,223	1,253	1,306	1,543	1,624	
Independent	John O'Neill	2.76	462	498	522	527	597	705			
Workers' Party	Owen Martin	2.09	350	381	409	416					
Workers' Party	John Dunne	2.05	343	398	413	418	567				
Fianna Fáil	Niall McCullagh	2.05	344	361	365						
Electorate: 36,984 Valid: 16,746 (45.28%) Spoilt: 302 Quota: 2,792 Turnout: 17,048 (46.10%)

=== Cabra-Glasnevin ===
Cabra-Glasnevin - 5 seats
Party	Candidate	FPv%	Count								
Party	Candidate	FPv%	1	2	3	4	5	6	7	8	9
Fianna Fáil	Mary Fitzpatrick*	18.14	3,088								
Labour	Aine Clancy*	15.40	2,621	2,648	2,690	3,126					
Independent	Cieran Perry	14.75	2,510	2,535	2,577	2,703	2,728	3,067			
Fine Gael	Mary O'Shea*	9.74	1,657	1,683	2,185	2,323	2,374	2,766	2,846		
Sinn Féin	Seamus McGrattan*	9.59	1,633	1,644	1,656	1,691	1,699	1,883	1,939	1,944	2,243
Fianna Fáil	Maurice Ahern*	8.35	1,422	1,474	1,481	1,534	1,554	1,605	1,620	1,621	2,230
Fianna Fáil	Seaghan Kearney	7.71	1,313	1,380	1,389	1,454	1,476	1,589	1,611	1,614	
Labour	Mick Deegan	6.13	1,044	1,059	1,106	1,209	1,372				
Green	Gary Fitzgerald	6.08	1,035	1,054	1,065						
Fine Gael	Harry McNab	4.10	697	706							
Electorate: 31,882 Valid: 17,020 (53.38%) Spoilt: 239 Quota: 2,837 Turnout: 17,259 (54.13%)

=== Clontarf ===
Clontarf - 5 seats
Party	Candidate	FPv%	Count					
Party	Candidate	FPv%	1	2	3	4	5	6
Independent	Damian O'Farrell	20.38	4,194					
Fine Gael	Gerry Breen*	16.74	3,445					
Labour	Aodhán Ó Ríordáin*	16.45	3,387	3,607				
Fianna Fáil	Deirdre Heney*	13.25	2,728	2,812	2,826	2,915	2,980	3,995
Fine Gael	Naoise Ó Muirí*	13.01	2,677	2,832	2,903	3,058	3,183	3,363
Fianna Fáil	Ronan Callely	7.05	1,451	1,486	1,500	1,547	1,600	
Independent	Bronwen Maher*	6.23	1,283	1,467	1,512	1,739	2,091	2,227
Sinn Féin	Helen McCormack	3.90	803	846	862	899		
Green	Donna Cooney	2.99	616	658	674			
Electorate: 37,082 Valid: 20,584 (55.51%) Spoilt: 212 Quota: 3,431 Turnout: 20,796 (56.08%)

=== Crumlin-Kimmage ===
Crumlin-Kimmage - 4 seats
Party	Candidate	FPv%	Count					
Party	Candidate	FPv%	1	2	3	4	5	6
Labour	Eric Byrne*	25.34	3,652					
People Before Profit	Joan Collins*	17.43	2,512	2,647	2,827	3,356		
Labour	Henry Upton	14.35	2,068	2,449	2,854	3,166		
Fianna Fáil	Charlie Ardagh*	13.18	1,899	1,940	2,111	2,211	2,265	2,294
Fine Gael	Ruairi McGinley*	13.14	1,894	2,005	2,240	2,338	2,473	2,603
Sinn Féin	Ray McHugh*	8.69	1,253	1,296	1,355			
Green	Tony McDermott	6.87	990	1,045				
Christian Solidarity	Colm Callanan	0.99	143	146				
Electorate: 30,163 Valid: 14,411 (47.78%) Spoilt: 175 Quota: 2,883 Turnout: 14,586 (48.36%)

=== Donaghmede ===
Donaghmede - 4 seats
Party	Candidate	FPv%	Count						
Party	Candidate	FPv%	1	2	3	4	5	6	7
Labour	Seán Kenny*	24.78	4,119						
Sinn Féin	Killian Forde*	16.07	2,671	2,734	2,778	2,832	2,914	3,283	3,312
Fianna Fáil	Tom Brabazon*	14.82	2,464	2,516	2,558	2,580	3,273	3,465	
Fine Gael	Patrick Crimmins*	12.85	2,137	2,224	2,254	2,655	2,831	3,024	3,072
Labour	Brian McDowell	10.49	1,744	2,207	2,264	2,393	2,464	2,900	2,937
Independent	Brian Byrne	7.23	1,202	1,238	1,509	1,555	1,602		
Fianna Fáil	Martin McGettigan	6.69	1,112	1,139	1,159	1,181			
Fine Gael	Dave O'Connor	4.11	684	719	729				
Independent	John Clare	2.96	492	522					
Electorate: 33,098 Valid: 16,625 (50.23%) Spoilt: 259 Quota: 3,326 Turnout: 16,884 (51.01%)

=== North Inner City ===
North Inner City - 6 seats
Party	Candidate	FPv%	Count										
Party	Candidate	FPv%	1	2	3	4	5	6	7	8	9	10	11
Independent	Maureen O'Sullivan*	24.03	2,859										
Labour	Emer Costello*	17.52	2,084										
Sinn Féin	Christy Burke*	12.92	1,537	1,832									
Independent	Nial Ring	8.41	1,000	1,188	1,209	1,232	1,244	1,263	1,291	1,326	1,420	1,453	1,509
Fine Gael	Ray McAdam	7.82	930	1,024	1,070	1,078	1,089	1,106	1,119	1,137	1,176	1,225	1,363
Labour	Claire O'Regan	7.50	892	1,106	1,304	1,318	1,319	1,369	1,442	1,507	1,620	1,662	2,024
Fianna Fáil	Tom Stafford*	4.46	530	603	619	627	642	645	652	664	680	950	1,016
Green	David Geary	4.36	519	589	627	636	639	660	693	736	773	826	
Fianna Fáil	Ray Dunne	4.06	483	514	525	529	534	535	537	546	563		
Sinn Féin	Ruadhan MacAodhain	2.68	319	340	362	398	404	411	445				
Workers' Party	Malachy Steenson	2.36	281	344	353	370	379	391	460	507			
People Before Profit	Colm Stephens	1.77	210	276	285	292	303	335					
Independent	Patrick Tatlhego Maphoso	1.29	154	188	199	203	206						
Christian Solidarity	Paul O'Loughlin	0.82	98	108	111	113							
Electorate: 32,072 Valid: 11,896 (37.09%) Spoilt: 178 Quota: 1,700 Turnout: 12,074 (37.65%)

=== Pembroke-Rathmines ===
Pembroke-Rathmines - 6 seats
Party	Candidate	FPv%	Count									
Party	Candidate	FPv%	1	2	3	4	5	6	7	8	9	10
Fine Gael	Eoghan Murphy	15.00	2,637									
Labour	Oisín Quinn*	11.30	1,986	1,993	2,008	2,033	2,057	2,116	2,239	2,530		
Labour	Dermot Lacey*	10.48	1,843	1,850	1,858	1,878	1,898	1,930	2,033	2,173	2,282	2,379
Labour	Mary Freehill*	10.17	1,788	1,795	1,800	1,820	1,856	1,877	2,069	2,376	2,565	
Fine Gael	Edie Wynne*	9.69	1,704	1,712	1,745	1,759	1,783	1,827	1,867	2,032	2,149	2,240
Fine Gael	Paddy McCartan*	9.49	1,668	1,675	1,719	1,727	1,743	1,785	1,828	1,900	2,004	2,061
Fianna Fáil	Michael Donnelly*	7.87	1,384	1,389	1,391	1,395	1,403	1,561	1,579	1,646		
Fianna Fáil	Jim O'Callaghan	7.71	1,356	1,359	1,364	1,374	1,386	1,720	1,736	1,830	2,757	
Green	Dave Robbins	6.13	1,077	1,088	1,093	1,131	1,162	1,200	1,375			
Fianna Fáil	Garrett Tubridy	4.45	782	784	789	798	810					
People Before Profit	Bryce Evans	3.64	639	654	655	735	859	875				
Sinn Féin	Oisin O'Dubhlain	1.73	304	308	308							
Independent	Erik Eblana	1.62	285	320	322	361						
Independent	Emmanuel Sweeney	0.71	125									
Electorate: 39,363 Valid: 17,578 (44.66%) Spoilt: 143 Quota: 2,512 Turnout: 17,721 (45.02%)

=== South-East Inner City ===
South-East Inner City - 4 seats
Party	Candidate	FPv%	Count					
Party	Candidate	FPv%	1	2	3	4	5	6
Labour	Kevin Humphreys*	27.46	2,598					
Independent	Mannix Flynn	14.60	1,381	1,460	1,509	1,527	1,791	2,003
Fine Gael	Catherine Noone	13.04	1,234	1,310	1,317	1,337	1,476	1,655
Sinn Féin	Daithí Doolan*	11.87	1,123	1,202	1,223	1,251	1,299	1,411
Labour	Maria Parodi	10.64	1,007	1,348	1,362	1,379	1,642	1,822
Fianna Fáil	Sarah Ryan*	8.34	789	822	830	1,027	1,148	
Green	Claire Wheeler	5.75	544	580	591	610		
Fianna Fáil	Vicky Crosby	3.38	320	334	341			
Independent	Esther Uzell	3.32	314	347	377	381		
Independent	Damien Cassidy	0.84	79	88				
Independent	Noel Ivory	0.75	71	76				
Electorate: 23,803 Valid: 9,460 (39.74%) Spoilt: 169 Quota: 1,893 Turnout: 9,629 (40.45%)

=== South-West Inner City ===
South-West Inner City - 4 seats
Party	Candidate	FPv%	Count						
Party	Candidate	FPv%	1	2	3	4	5	6	7
Labour	John Gallagher*	19.04	1,574	1,618	1,748				
Fine Gael	Clare Byrne*	16.93	1,400	1,418	1,454	1,472	1,608	1,632	1,869
Labour	Rebecca Moynihan	15.90	1,315	1,363	1,405	1,415	1,709		
Sinn Féin	Críona Ní Dhálaigh*	12.17	1,006	1,022	1,072	1,088	1,110	1,114	1,400
Fianna Fáil	Catherine Ardagh	8.70	719	731	995	1,024	1,097	1,104	1,158
People Before Profit	Tina McVeigh	8.25	682	759	789	800	927	947	
Green	Martin Hogan	8.18	676	709	732	742			
Fianna Fáil	Anita Reilly	7.40	612	615					
Independent	Lisa Connell	2.27	229						
Independent	Lech Szczecinski	0.67	55						
Electorate: 21,934 Valid: 8,268 (37.69%) Spoilt: 188 Quota: 1,654 Turnout: 8,456 (38.55%)
