= 2004 Dublin City Council election =

2004 Irish local government election

- 11 June 2004

All 52 seats on Dublin City Council
	First party	Second party	Third party
Party	Labour	Fianna Fáil	Sinn Féin
Seats won	16	12	10
Seat change	▲2	▼8	▲6
	Fourth party	Fifth party	Sixth party
Party	Fine Gael	Green	Progressive Democrats
Seats won	9	1	1
Seat change	0	▼1	▲1
	Seventh party
Party	Independent
Seats won	3
Seat change	0
- Map showing the area of Dublin City Council
Council control before election
Labour Party
Fine Gael
Green Party
Council control after election
Labour Party
Fine Gael

An election to Dublin City Council took place on 11 June 2004 as part of that year's Irish local elections. 52 councillors were elected from thirteen local electoral areas (LEAs) for a five-year term of office on the electoral system of proportional representation by means of the single transferable vote (PR-STV).

== Results by party ==
Party	Seats	±	First Pref. votes	FPv%	±%
Labour	16	▲2	36,057	20.57	
Fianna Fáil	12	▼8	39,865	22.74	
Sinn Féin	10	▲6	32,639	18.62	
Fine Gael	9	0	29,873	17.04	
Green	1	▼1	11,314	6.46	
Progressive Democrats	1	▲1	6,404	3.65	
Socialist Workers	0	0	2,904	1.66	
Workers' Party	0	0	1,564	0.89	
Socialist Party	0	0	579	0.33	
Christian Solidarity	0	0	214	0.12	
Independent	3	0	13,861	7.90	
Totals	52	0	175,274	100.00	—

== Results by local electoral area ==
=== Artane ===
Artane - 4 seats
Party	Candidate	FPv%	Count						
Party	Candidate	FPv%	1	2	3	4	5	6	7
Sinn Féin	Larry O'Toole*	32.11	4,497						
Fine Gael	Terence Flanagan	18.52	2,594	2,776	2,944				
Fianna Fáil	Seán Paul Mahon*	12.30	1,723	1,883	1,895	1,963	2,789	2,800	2,945
Labour	Paddy Bourke	9.31	1,304	1,501	1,519	1,687	1,771	1,815	2,217
Fianna Fáil	Brian Taylor	8.11	1,136	1,219	1,239	1,301			
Labour	Sinead Seery	7.08	991	1,262	1,304	1,486	1,607	1,657	2,027
Socialist Workers	Ritchie Browne	5.65	792	1,328	1,341	1,568	1,629	1,634	
Green	Simon Herbert	4.93	691	915	937				
Fine Gael	Dan Sullivan	1.98	278	320					
Electorate: 26,316 Valid: 14,006 (53.22%) Spoilt: 424 Quota: 2,802 Turnout: 14,430 (54.83%)

=== Ballyfermot ===
Ballyfermot - 3 seats
Party	Candidate	FPv%	Count			
Party	Candidate	FPv%	1	2	3	4
Sinn Féin	Tony Smithers	21.17	1,970	2,037	2,112	2,256
Labour	Michael Conaghan*	20.70	1,926	2,049	2,205	2,668
Independent	Vincent Jackson*	20.63	1,920	2,043	2,265	2,453
Socialist Workers	Bríd Smith	11.76	1,094	1,166	1,199	1,256
Fine Gael	Peter O'Neill	10.56	983	1,043	1,187	
Fianna Fáil	Marian McGennis*	8.61	801	866		
Green	Sinead Ni Bhroin	2.35	219			
Progressive Democrats	Ben Doyle	2.20	205			
Workers' Party	Andrew McGuinness	2.02	188			
Electorate: 19,463 Valid: 9,306 (47.81%) Spoilt: 264 Quota: 2,327 Turnout: 9,570 (49.17%)

=== Ballymun-Whitehall ===
Ballymun-Whitehall - 3 seats
Party	Candidate	FPv%	Count						
Party	Candidate	FPv%	1	2	3	4	5	6	7
Sinn Féin	Ray Corcoran	24.20	2,270	2,324	2,355				
Labour	Andrew Montague	17.89	1,678	1,721	1,807	1,987	2,057	2,486	
Fianna Fáil	Julia Carmichael	16.17	1,517	1,534	1,562	1,585	1,867	1,934	2,463
Fine Gael	Brendan Brady	12.25	1,149	1,155	1,200	1,240	1,286	1,365	1,457
Fianna Fáil	Sheila Gallogly*	6.54	613	616	629	651	809	812	
Labour	Eamonn O'Brien*	6.44	604	626	645	710	725		
Fianna Fáil	Padraig Johnston	6.32	593	597	611	624			
Workers' Party	John Dunne	4.04	379	442	474				
Green	Dermot Hamilton	3.42	321	346					
Socialist Workers	Kevin Wingfield	2.73	256						
Electorate: 19,188 Valid: 9,380 (48.88%) Spoilt: 279 Quota: 2,346 Turnout: 9,659 (50.34%)

=== Cabra-Glasnevin ===
Cabra-Glasnevin - 5 seats
Party	Candidate	FPv%	Count									
Party	Candidate	FPv%	1	2	3	4	5	6	7	8	9	10
Sinn Féin	Nicky Kehoe*	19.88	3,609									
Labour	Brendan Carr*	11.12	2,019	2,042	2,053	2,435	2,525	3,021	3,208			
Fianna Fáil	Mary Fitzpatrick*	10.18	1,848	1,872	1,902	1,917	1,952	2,005	2,108	2,114	2,753	2,815
Independent	Cieran Perry	9.65	1,753	1,843	1,931	1,955	2,142	2,346	2,421	2,434	2,579	2,612
Fianna Fáil	Maurice Ahern*	9.59	1,742	1,761	1,785	1,806	1,846	1,917	2,035	2,052	2,668	2,705
Fine Gael	Paschal Donohoe	9.38	1,703	1,712	1,722	1,766	1,796	1,928	2,795	2,886	3,159	
Fianna Fáil	John Stephens	8.89	1,615	1,632	1,661	1,676	1,705	1,757	1,876	1,884		
Fine Gael	Chris Giblin*	7.66	1,391	1,397	1,417	1,487	1,518	1,620				
Green	Thomas Simpson	6.18	1,122	1,135	1,168	1,229	1,342					
Labour	Fintan Gibney	3.62	658	667	675							
Sinn Féin	Aine Ni Gabhann	2.19	397	766	778	798						
Independent	Pat Talbot	1.65	300	303								
Electorate: 32,485 Valid: 18,157 (55.89%) Spoilt: 480 Quota: 3,027 Turnout: 18,637 (57.37%)

=== Clontarf ===
Clontarf - 5 seats
Party	Candidate	FPv%	Count								
Party	Candidate	FPv%	1	2	3	4	5	6	7	8	9
Fianna Fáil	Deirdre Heney*	21.79	4,487								
Fine Gael	Gerry Breen*	15.51	3,193	3,270	3,289	3,536					
Fine Gael	Naoise Ó Muirí	9.86	2,029	2,112	2,156	2,322	2,379	2,416	2,606	2,789	2,937
Green	Bronwen Maher	7.65	1,576	1,645	1,716	1,815	1,914	1,924	2,335	2,445	2,976
Sinn Féin	Peter Lawlor	7.18	1,478	1,516	1,549	1,578	1,649	1,651	1,865	1,940	
Fianna Fáil	Eibhlin Byrne*	6.90	1,421	1,776	1,789	1,903	1,960	1,974	2,090	3,107	3,346
Labour	Orla Farrell*	6.75	1,389	1,419	1,444	1,523	2,198	2,217	2,491	2,584	2,935
Independent	Fintan Cassidy*	6.52	1,343	1,383	1,474	1,526	1,586	1,594			
Fianna Fáil	John Stafford*	6.06	1,248	1,531	1,549	1,651	1,706	1,720	1,819		
Labour	Willie Hamilton	5.32	1,092	1,114	1,137	1,157					
Progressive Democrats	Dennis McIntyre	4.58	942	984	992						
Independent	Kevin O'Hare	1.89	390	406							
Electorate: 35,703 Valid: 20,588 (57.66%) Spoilt: 460 Quota: 3,432 Turnout: 21,048 (58.95%)

=== Crumlin-Kimmage ===
Crumlin-Kimmage - 5 seats
Party	Candidate	FPv%	Count								
Party	Candidate	FPv%	1	2	3	4	5	6	7	8	9
Labour	Eric Byrne*	20.08	4,045								
Sinn Féin	Robbie Sargent	16.01	3,225	3,280	3,465						
Independent	Joan Collins	13.78	2,777	2,863	3,046	3,079	3,251	3,389			
Fianna Fáil	Charlie Ardagh*	12.20	2,459	2,511	2,662	2,668	2,758	3,664			
Fine Gael	Anne Marie Martin*	8.03	1,617	1,691	1,809	1,819	2,024	2,135	2,257	2,270	2,854
Fianna Fáil	David Gaynor*	7.10	1,430	1,456	1,553	1,559	1,614				
Fine Gael	Ruairi McGinley*	7.01	1,413	1,457	1,525	1,531	1,680	1,761	1,861	1,865	2,182
Green	Kristina McElroy	5.77	1,162	1,222	1,343	1,366	1,672	1,759	1,842	1,855	
Labour	Gearoid O Maoilmhichill	4.51	909	1,161	1,258	1,280					
Progressive Democrats	Brian McElroy	3.83	771	796							
Workers' Party	Brendan Phelan	1.69	341	353							
Electorate: 38,646 Valid: 20,149 (52.14%) Spoilt: 563 Quota: 3,359 Turnout: 20,712 (53.59%)

=== Donaghmede ===
Donaghmede - 5 seats
Party	Candidate	FPv%	Count								
Party	Candidate	FPv%	1	2	3	4	5	6	7	8	9
Sinn Féin	Killian Forde	17.15	3,509								
Labour	Seán Kenny*	16.84	3,445								
Fianna Fáil	Tom Brabazon*	12.79	2,616	2,746	2,754	2,756	3,142	3,220	4,032		
Labour	Anne Carter*	9.21	1,884	1,975	1,998	2,015	2,080	2,463	2,541	2,615	2,901
Independent	Tom Brennan	8.73	1,786	1,834	1,856	1,858	1,901	2,153	2,290	2,412	2,563
Fine Gael	Patrick Crimmins	8.04	1,645	1,728	1,733	1,737	1,790	1,863	1,920	1,988	
Fine Gael	Niamh Cosgrave*	7.88	1,612	1,721	1,728	1,732	1,781	1,934	2,014	2,108	3,162
Green	Donna Cooney	5.51	1,127	1,192	1,217	1,220	1,275				
Fianna Fáil	Brian Byrne*	5.07	1038	1,108	1,113	1,114	1,434	1,481			
Fianna Fáil	John Clare*	4.73	967	1,090	1,094	1,096					
Progressive Democrats	Aidan Kennedy	2.59	529								
Fianna Fáil	Michael McPherson	1.47	301								
Electorate: 36,800 Valid: 20,459 (55.60%) Spoilt: 610 Quota: 3,410 Turnout: 21,069 (57.25%)

=== Finglas ===
Finglas - 4 seats
Party	Candidate	FPv%	Count						
Party	Candidate	FPv%	1	2	3	4	5	6	7
Sinn Féin	Dessie Ellis*	29.84	4,300						
Labour	Mary Murphy*	13.78	1,985	2,082	2,196	2,309	2,617	2,899	
Fine Gael	Bill Tormey	12.10	1,743	1,812	1,866	1,924	2,126	2,296	2,569
Fianna Fáil	Liam Kelly*	11.60	1,672	1,729	1,760	1,779	1,952	2,025	2,962
Fianna Fáil	Conor Sludds*	10.03	1,445	1,513	1,532	1,555	1,705	1,785	
Progressive Democrats	Paul McAuliffe	7.16	1,031	1,090	1,143	1,185			
Independent	John O'Neill	5.86	845	978	1,066	1,209	1,314		
Green	Aiden Meagher	3.35	483	515					
Workers' Party	Owen Martin	3.18	458	560	596				
Sinn Féin	Sandra Sludds	3.10	446	1,247	1,295	1,388	1,479	1,812	2,008
Electorate: 27,146 Valid: 14,408 (53.08%) Spoilt: 367 Quota: 2,882 Turnout: 14,775 (54.43%)

=== North Inner City ===
North Inner City - 5 seats
Party	Candidate	FPv%	Count											
Party	Candidate	FPv%	1	2	3	4	5	6	7	8	9	10	11	12
Sinn Féin	Christy Burke*	14.78	1,869	1,878	1,881	1,998	2,443							
Labour	Emer Costello*	14.49	1,832	1,838	1,848	1,910	1,945	2,002	2,211					
Labour	Aodhán Ó Ríordáin	11.17	1,412	1,417	1,428	1,454	1,474	1,503	1,660	1,726	2,086	2,329		
Independent	Mick Rafferty	8.68	1,097	1,105	1,137	1,211	1,233	1,300	1,332	1,339	1,461	1,787	1,888	2,050
Fianna Fáil	Margeurite Fitzpatrick	8.13	1,028	1,029	1,046	1,085	1,101	1,120	1,175	1,181	1,218	1,265	1,275	1,468
Fianna Fáil	Tom Stafford*	8.01	1,013	1,013	1,037	1,066	1,076	1,091	1,116	1,118	1,134	1,200	1,219	1,712
Fianna Fáil	Nial Ring	7.86	994	996	1,010	1,037	1,038	1,046	1,092	1,093	1,117	1,163	1,189	
Independent	Joe Mooney	5.60	708	721	730	792	801	830	850	854	943			
Green	Phil Kearney	5.23	661	662	677	712	722	751	810	827				
Fine Gael	Valerie Ni Fhaolain	4.84	612	612	630	648	653	661						
Sinn Féin	Ciaran MacAnnraoi	4.63	585	586	592	623								
Independent	Paul Kangley	2.18	276	282	291									
Independent	Ernie Beggs	2.17	274	281	296									
Christian Solidarity	Paul O'Loughlin	1.69	214	217										
Independent	Michael Gallagher	0.53	67											
Electorate: 31,067 Valid: 12,642 (40.69%) Spoilt: 489 Quota: 2,108 Turnout: 13,131 (42.27%)

=== Pembroke ===
Pembroke - 3 seats
Party	Candidate	FPv%	Count					
Party	Candidate	FPv%	1	2	3	4	5	6
Labour	Dermot Lacey*	18.87	1,796	1,878	2,370	2,561		
Progressive Democrats	Wendy Hederman	16.62	1,582	1,640	1,843	1,991	2,189	2,252
Fine Gael	Lucinda Creighton	16.46	1,567	1,617	1,800	2,644		
Fianna Fáil	Chris Andrews*	16.16	1,538	1,767	1,865	1,973	2,039	2,079
Fine Gael	Paddy McCartan	13.21	1,257	1,285	1,379			
Green	Claire Wheeler*	11.82	1,125	1,260				
Sinn Féin	Sinead Pembroke	3.47	330					
Fianna Fáil	Michael Turley	3.39	323					
Electorate: 18,914 Valid: 9,518 (50.32%) Spoilt: 177 Quota: 2,380 Turnout: 9,695 (36.31%)

=== Rathmines ===
Rathmines - 4 seats
Party	Candidate	FPv%	Count					
Party	Candidate	FPv%	1	2	3	4	5	6
Labour	Mary Freehill*	15.94	1,757	1,835	1,930	1,984	2,141	2,284
Labour	Oisín Quinn	13.38	1,475	1,497	1,575	1,700	1,784	2,003
Fianna Fáil	Michael Donnelly*	12.60	1,389	1,405	1,468	1,896	1,971	2,280
Fine Gael	Brian Gillen	12.28	1,354	1,361	1,383	1,438	2,027	2,342
Green	Ryan Meade*	10.98	1,210	1,310	1,475	1,519	1,571	1,699
Progressive Democrats	Tony Williams	9.25	1,020	1,028	1,050	1,171	1,267	
Fine Gael	Edie Wynne	9.18	1,012	1,023	1,041	1,094		
Fianna Fáil	Jim O'Callaghan	8.18	902	908	941			
Sinn Féin	Eoin O Sé	5.29	583	632				
Socialist Workers	Terry Connolly	1.95	215					
Independent	Eoin Tierney	0.97	107					
Electorate: 24,594 Valid: 11,024 (44.82%) Spoilt: 228 Quota: 2,205 Turnout: 11,252 (45.75%)

=== South-East Inner City ===
South-East Inner City - 3 seats
Party	Candidate	FPv%	Count									
Party	Candidate	FPv%	1	2	3	4	5	6	7	8	9	10
Labour	Kevin Humphreys*	24.86	1,980	1,987	2,001							
Sinn Féin	Daithí Doolan	24.11	1,921	1,928	1,972	2,032						
Fianna Fáil	Garry Keegan*	14.35	1,143	1,145	1,161	1,172	1,175	1,193	1,275	1,327	1,704	1,878
Green	Pauline O'Shea	8.35	665	675	692	728	737	876	931	979	1,025	1,294
Fianna Fáil	Pat Bunce	6.63	528	531	536	557	564	583	634	663		
Fine Gael	John Barry	5.10	406	408	410	411	414	423	456	686	749	
Fine Gael	Conor Delaney	4.32	344	347	351	356	356	365	417			
Progressive Democrats	John Kenny	4.07	324	324	326	334	336	353				
Socialist Workers	Shay Ryan	3.00	239	249	265	305	318					
Workers' Party	Angie Murphy	2.49	198	205	213							
Independent	Linda Poole	1.83	146	155								
Independent	Noel Ivory	0.90	72									
Electorate: 18,360 Valid: 7,966 (43.39%) Spoilt: 256 Quota: 1,992 Turnout: 8,222 (44.78%)

=== South-West Inner City ===
South-West Inner City - 3 seats
Party	Candidate	FPv%	Count					
Party	Candidate	FPv%	1	2	3	4	5	6
Fine Gael	Catherine Byrne*	22.64	1,971	1,990	2,111	2,165	2,178	
Labour	John Gallagher*	21.55	1,876	1,940	1,986	2,230		
Sinn Féin	Andrew O'Connell	18.96	1,650	1,703	1,734	1,894	1,909	2,108
Green	Patricia Gardiner	10.94	952	993	1,025	1,118	1,139	1,485
Fianna Fáil	Mary Mooney*	9.12	794	804	1,102	1,124	1,128	
Fianna Fáil	Tom Brunkard	6.65	579	584				
Socialist Party	Diarmuid Naessens	6.59	574	658	663			
Socialist Workers	Brendan Donohoe	3.54	308					
Electorate: 20,603 Valid: 8,704 (42.25%) Spoilt: 287 Quota: 2,177 Turnout: 8,991 (43.64%)
