= Nial Ring =

Irish politician

Cllr Nial Ring
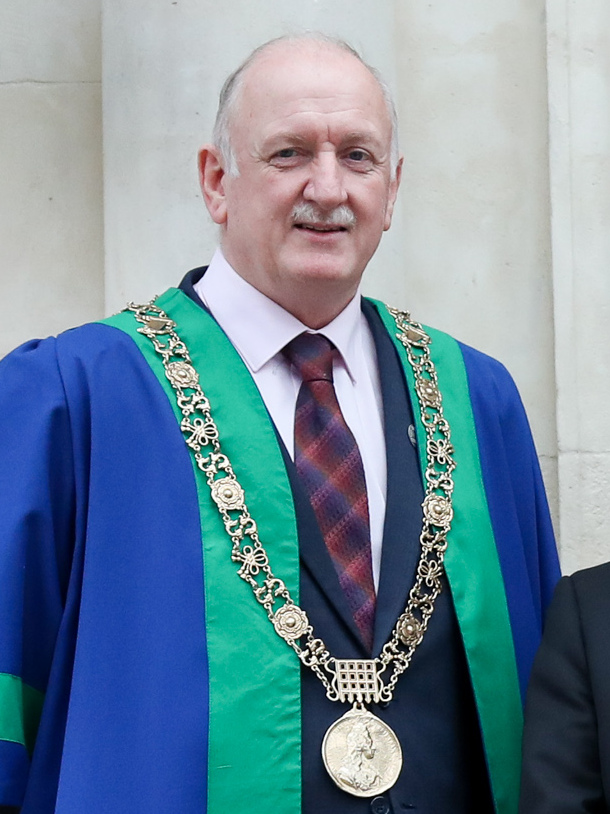
- Ring in 2019

Dublin City Councillor
- Incumbent
- Assumed office May 2009
- Constituency: Dublin North Inner City

Lord Mayor of Dublin
- In office June 2018 – June 2019
- Preceded by: Mícheál Mac Donncha
- Succeeded by: Paul McAuliffe

Personal details
- Born: Ballybough, Dublin, Ireland
- Party: Independent
- Other political affiliations: Fianna Fáil (until 2009)
- Spouse: Joyce Ring
- Children: 4
- Education: Dublin City University, University College Dublin

Nial Ring is an Irish politician and Dublin city councillor, who served as Lord Mayor of Dublin from June 2018 to June 2019. An independent politician who was formerly a member of Fianna Fáil, he was first elected councillor for the Dublin North Inner City local electoral area (where he is from) in 2009, and was re-elected in 2014, 2019 and 2024. He serves on the Central Area Committee, Central Area JPC, the Finance SPC, the Economic and Development SPC, the Audit Committee and the Fóchoiste Gaeilge in Dublin City Council.

== Early life and business career ==
Born in Ballybough, Ring attended O'Connell School and holds an honours degree in Accounting and Finance from DCU and a diploma in financial law from University College Dublin.. He is a Fellow of the Association of Chartered Certified Accountants and also has an Advanced Diploma in Mediation from The Honorable Society of King's Inns. He is a member of the Mediators' Institute of Ireland and also was awarded the Certificate in CPD in Climate Crisis and local Government from UCC.

He began his banking career with Allied Irish Banks in 1977, working in Dublin, London and in New York. From 1984 he was associate director of AIB International Financial Services. He set up Barrick Capital Corporation in 1992, an IFSC-based subsidiary of international mining firm Barrick Gold. He was general manager there until 1995. In the late 1990s he was head of finance at Bankgesellschaft Berlin (Ireland). He left Bankgesellschaft in 2001. He was appointed to the board of the IDA in 1998 and served on it for 11 years.

== Politics ==
Described by the Irish Independent as "from a staunch Fianna Fáil family", Ring was a political ally of Bertie Ahern for many years. He contested the 2004 Dublin City Council election for Fianna Fáil but was not elected; a report in the Sunday Business Post said he spent €28,000 of his own money at that election, the highest in the area. After not being selected to run for the party in the 2009 election, he announced he would leave the party and contest the election as an independent; while he described himself as still being a supporter of Ahern, he said he did not "want to be associated with the Fianna Fail that would take the medical cards off elderly people". He was elected to Dublin City Council at that election. He was re-elected in 2014, 2019 and 2024.

In June 2018, he was elected as the Lord Mayor of Dublin.

== Personal life ==
Ring is a grandnephew of Liam Ó Rinn, who wrote the Irish-language version of "The Soldiers' Song", Ireland's national anthem. He himself has a keen interest in Irish History, particularly the 1916 period when his grandfather and four brothers fought as part of the GPO Garrison in Easter Week 1916. He is an executive member of the 1916 Relatives Association. He is noted on the Dublin City Council website as being willing to do business in Irish.

Ring is married to Joyce and has four children. He is a Chelsea supporter.

Civic offices
Preceded by Mícheál Mac Donncha	Lord Mayor of Dublin; 2018–2019	Succeeded by Paul McAuliffe
