= Daithí Doolan =

Irish politician (born 1968)

Cllr Daithí Doolan
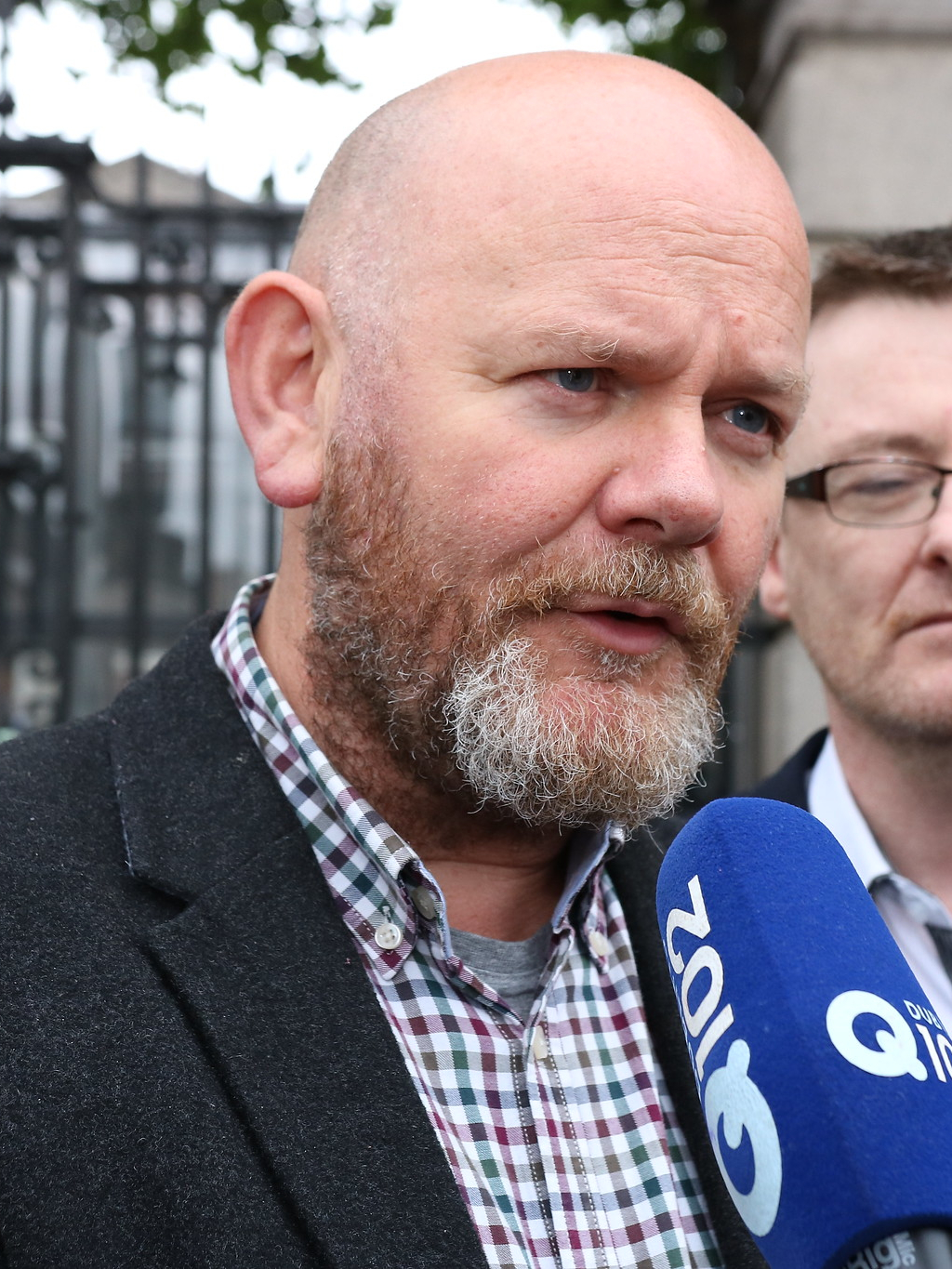
- Doolan in 2018

Dublin City Councillor
- In office 2004–2009
- Constituency: South East Inner City
- Incumbent
- Assumed office 2014
- Constituency: Ballyfermot–Drimnagh

Personal details
- Born: 13 May 1968 (age 57) Cork, Ireland
- Party: Sinn Féin
- Spouse: Bridget Kildee
- Children: 4

Daithí Doolan (born 13 May 1968) is an Irish politician. A member of Sinn Féin, he is a councillor on Dublin City Council.

== Elections ==
=== Dublin City Council ===
Doolan contested the 1999 Dublin City Council election for Sinn Féin in the South East Inner City local electoral area (LEA). He polled 13.38%, coming fourth and missing out on a seat by 62 votes. At the 2004 election, he was elected to the South East Inner City LEA again, polling 24.11% and securing the second seat. At the 2009 election, he polled 11.9% and lost his seat by 259 votes.

At the 2014 election, Doolan was elected in the Ballyfermot–Drimnagh LEA, topping the poll with 19.28%. He was re-elected at the 2019 election, and again at the 2024 election.

=== Irish general elections and European Parliament elections ===
Doolan contested the 2002 Irish general election in Dublin South-East, coming seventh with 2,398 first preference votes (7.39%). At the 2007 general election he polled 1,599 first preference votes (4.72%) in Dublin South-East, again coming seventh. At the 2024 general election he polled 8.81% in Dublin South-Central, coming sixth.

He contested the 2024 European Parliament election for the Dublin constituency, where he polled in ninth place out of twenty-three candidates.

== Career ==
As an elected councillor between 2004 and 2009, Doolan called for the easing of restrictions on immigrant workers, and for better fire-safety provisions in apartment construction. He opposed the creation of an energy-from-waste facility at Poolbeg, supported the Shell to Sea campaign and opposed cuts to Dublin public services.

Doolan was involved in controversy after a Dubliner, Joseph Rafferty, was shot dead. Rafferty's sister, Esther Uzell-Rafferty, claimed that the IRA had killed her brother, and that Doolan knew the identity of his killer, claims which Doolan denied. Doolan's denial of involvement in the murder was later backed up by a report from Taoiseach Bertie Ahern. Ahern stated "I don't think there were any instructions given by the IRA," adding: "Elements, probably of criminality, claimed they had links with republicans." Doolan has called for public co-operation with the Garda in the investigation of Rafferty's murder.

After losing his seat in June 2009, Doolan was hired in October as the coordinator for the Dublin Citywide Drugs Crisis Campaign, an organisation that promotes a community development approach to tackling the drugs problem. As coordinator Doolan criticised the Government of Ireland for scrapping the once full-time position of Minister for National Drugs Strategy and relegating that role to another Minister with other responsibilities. As well as calling for a full-time junior minister, Doolan and CityWide requested the government scrap proposed funding cuts for drug services, also asking for additional funding for the issue, as well as for community participation and consultation for handling the drugs problem.

In September 2011 Doolan left Citywide to take up a post as parliamentary assistant to Peadar Tóibín TD. Before being re-elected to Dublin City Council in 2014, Doolan was parliamentary assistant to Brian Stanley TD. As of 2025, he serves as a parliamentary assistant to Ann Graves TD.

== Personal life ==
Doolan is married with four children. He has been a vegetarian since he was 16 because of his concerns for the environment.
