= Tom Brabazon =

Irish politician

Tom Brabazon TD
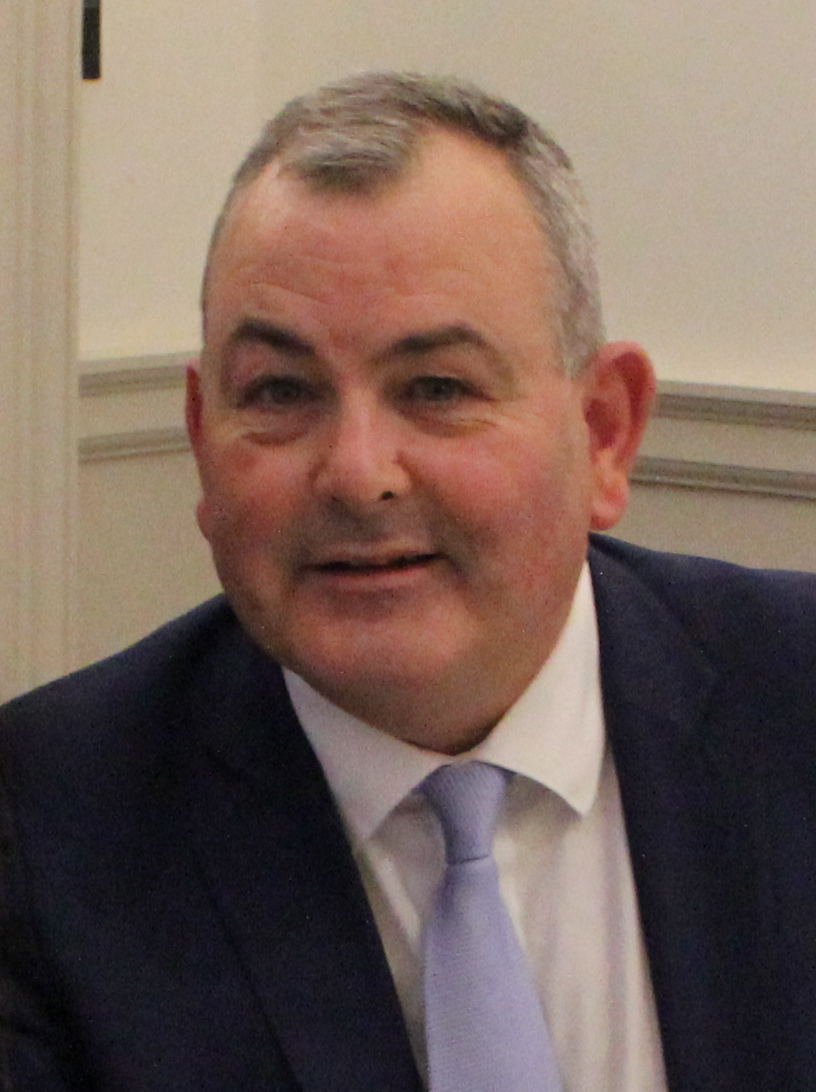
- Brabazon in 2024

Teachta Dála
- Incumbent
- Assumed office November 2024
- Constituency: Dublin Bay North

Lord Mayor of Dublin
- In office 13 February 2020 – 29 June 2020
- Preceded by: Paul McAuliffe
- Succeeded by: Hazel Chu

Personal details
- Born: 1969/1970 (age 55–56) Dublin, Ireland
- Party: Fianna Fáil
- Education: University College Dublin
- Occupation: Solicitor

Tom Brabazon (born 1969/1970) is an Irish Fianna Fáil politician who has been a Teachta Dála (TD) for the Dublin Bay North constituency since the 2024 general election.

A Dublin City Councillor from 2003 to 2024 for the Donaghmede area, he was elected Deputy Lord Mayor in 2019, and was elected Lord Mayor of Dublin in February 2020 following his predecessor Paul McAuliffe's election to Dáil Éireann. His term as Lord Mayor ended on 29 June 2020.

Brabazon was co-opted to Dublin City Council in 2003 following the abolition of the dual mandate and was re-elected in 2004, 2009, 2014, 2019 and 2024.

In 2015, Brabazon was criticised for comments in Northside People on childbirth and gender quotas, but later withdrew and apologised for the remarks.

In 2024, Brabazon was selected to contest the next general election for the Dublin Bay North constituency, with councillor Deirdre Heney later being added to the ticket.

At the 2024 general election, Brabazon was elected to the Dáil.

Civic offices
Preceded by Paul McAuliffe	Lord Mayor of Dublin; February 2020–June 2020	Succeeded by Hazel Chu

Dáil	Election	Deputy (Party)	Deputy (Party)	Deputy (Party)	Deputy (Party)	Deputy (Party)
32nd	2016	Denise Mitchell (SF)	Tommy Broughan (I4C)	Finian McGrath (Ind.)	Seán Haughey (FF)	Richard Bruton (FG)
33rd	2020	Denise Mitchell (SF)	Cian O'Callaghan (SD)	Aodhán Ó Ríordáin (Lab)	Seán Haughey (FF)	Richard Bruton (FG)
34th	2024	Denise Mitchell (SF)	Cian O'Callaghan (SD)	Barry Heneghan (Ind.)	Tom Brabazon (FF)	Naoise Ó Muirí (FG)
