= Independent Left (Ireland) =

Irish political party

Independent Left Páirtí Neamhspleách na hEite Clé
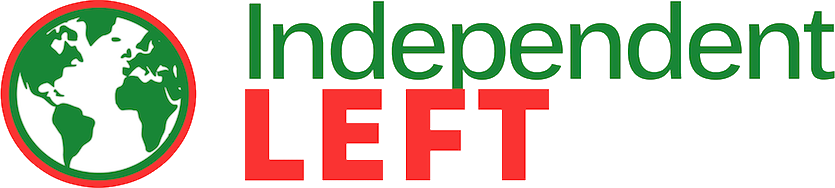
- Founded: January 2019
- Ideology: Socialism; Environmentalism
- Political position: Left-wing
- Local government: 1 / 949

Website
- independentleft.ie

Independent Left (Irish: Páirtí Neamhspleách na hEite Clé, lit. 'Independent Party of the Left wing') is a minor unregistered Irish political party with a socialist and environmentalist outlook. It was founded in January 2019.

== History ==
Independent Left was founded in Dublin in January 2019 in the run up to the 2019 local elections. Its members include John Lyons, Niamh McDonald and Conor Kostick.

In the 2014 local elections, John Lyons was elected to Dublin City Council in the local electoral area (LEA) of Beaumont–Donaghmede for People Before Profit. Lyons stood for election in the Dáil constituency of Dublin Bay North in the 2016 general election. He was not elected, being eliminated on the fourteenth count in seventh place for a five-seat constituency with 8,476 votes. On 7 January 2019, John Lyons left People Before Profit, saying the decision was a hard one, but "the difficulties I've had with the leadership of PBP over the future direction of the party in the Dublin Bay North area over the past six months could ultimately not be resolved."

At the 2019 Dublin City Council election, the local electoral boundaries were revised, and Lyons stood for Independent Left in the Artane–Whitehall LEA, being elected to the third (of six) seat on the sixth count. Niamh McDonald, who stood in the Donaghmede LEA, obtained 562 first preference votes and was not elected.

At the 2020 general election, John Lyons stood for Independent Left in the Dublin Bay North constituency. He was eliminated on the 13th count with 6,421 votes after transfers. His first preference vote was 1,882.

Lyons, listed on the ballot as an independent candidate, was re-elected to Dublin City Council in the 2024 local elections.

== Policies ==
Independent Left describe themselves as, "a new movement for environmentalism, socialism, freedom and equality." Their election material called for an environmentally sustainable city with easy access to public housing, healthcare and public transport. On NearFM, John Lyons advocated that all of the land that Dublin City Council control be used for public, affordable housing. Niamh McDonald has called for the introduction of community child care schemes, on a not-for-profit model.
