= Bronwen Maher =

Irish politician

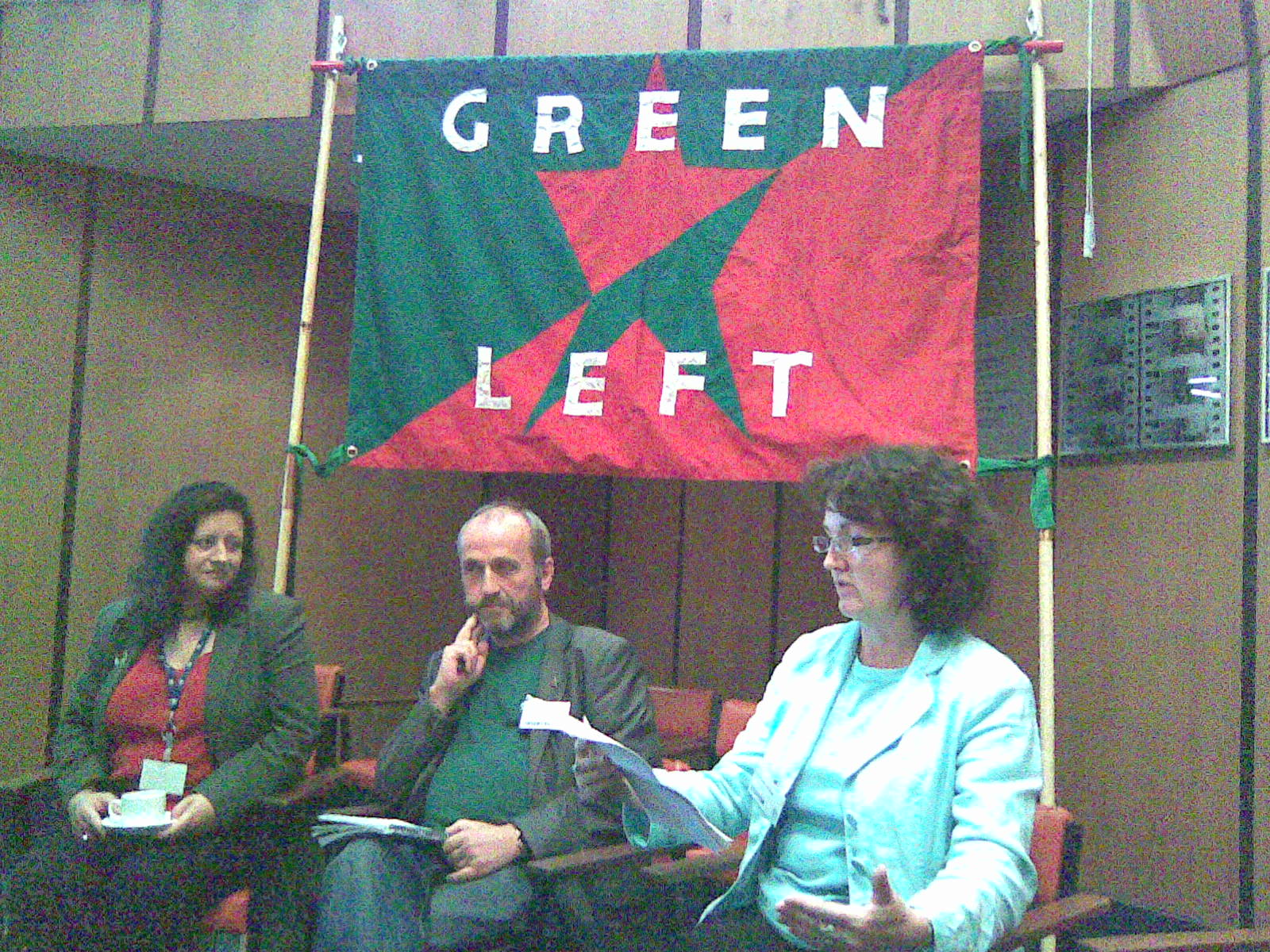
Bronwen Maher (right) shares her experiences with the Green Left meeting at Green Party of England and Wales conference, Hove 2009

Bronwen Maher (born 4 January 1957) is a former member of Dublin City Council who represented the Clontarf electoral area. She was elected as a Green Party councillor in 2004 on her third attempt. She was elected Deputy Lord Mayor of Dublin in June 2005, and elected Chairman of the Dublin Regional Authority 2007–2008. She is a former member of the Irish Green Party.

She was the Green Party candidate at the 2007 general election in the Dublin North-Central constituency, receiving 5% of the vote.

Author of the Green Party's "Manifesto for Women" and Green Party Spokesperson on Women's Affairs between 2002 and 2007, she also coordinated the party's Women's policy review and submission to the National Plan for Women 2002.

Originally from Artane, she was educated at Maryfield College, Drumcondra and the Holy Faith in Clontarf. She is married with one son and lives in Killester.

Maher joined the Green Party in 1989 and held many positions in the party over the years – as former MEP Patricia McKenna's election campaign manager in 1999, and a member of the party's election task force from 2001 to 2004 which organised the party's 2002 general election campaign and 2004 local election campaign.

On 22 January 2009, she announced her resignation from the Green Party, citing irreconcilable differences regarding policy and the direction of the party leadership. She stood as an Independent candidate at the 2009 local elections but was not re-elected. On 14 October 2009, it was announced that she had joined the Labour Party.

As of August 2013, she is employed as one of three local assistants by the former Labour Party MEP Nessa Childers.

In 2014, she was Nessa Childers's campaign manager.
