= Éirígí =

Irish political party

Éirígí - For A New Republic
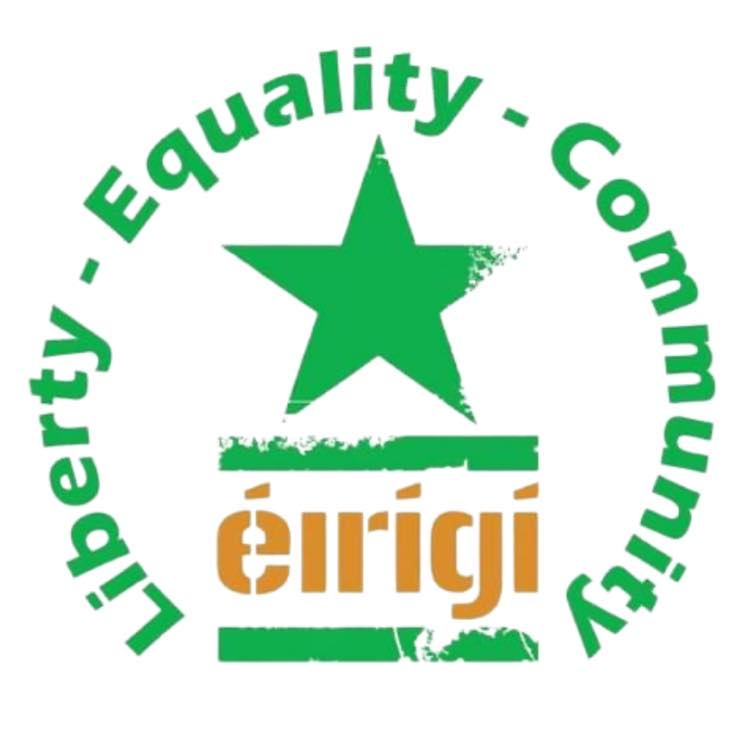
- Chairperson: Brian Leeson
- Founded: 24 April 2006
- Split from: Sinn Féin
- Headquarters: Dublin
- Ideology: Socialism; Irish republicanism Left-wing nationalism Anti-imperialism; Euroscepticism
- Political position: Left-wing

Website
- eirigi.org

Éirígí (Irish pronunciation: [ˈeːɾʲiːɟiː]), officially Éirígí For A New Republic, is a socialist republican political party in Ireland. The party name, Éirígí, means "Arise" or "Rise Up" in Irish, and is a reference to the slogan "The great only appear great because we are on our knees. Let us rise!" used by Irish socialists James Connolly and Jim Larkin. Éirígí was formed in 2006 by a group of community and political activists who broke away from Sinn Féin, believing that party was not committed enough to socialism.

== History ==
Éirígí was formed by a small group of community and political activists who had left Sinn Féin in Dublin on 24 April 2006, shortly before the 90th anniversary of the 1916 Easter Rising, as a political campaigns group. On 12 May 2007, at the party's first Ardfheis (conference), its members voted to become a fully-fledged political party, and at its 2009 conference passed a motion to register as a political party in the Republic of Ireland.

It gained its first local councillors in 2009, when two former Sinn Féin councillors, Dungannon councillor Barry Monteith and Dublin City Councillor Louise Minihan, joined the organisation. Former Wexford county councillor for Sinn Féin and New Ross town councillor John Dwyer also joined Éirígí. It registered with the Electoral Commission (United Kingdom) in 2011, standing for election in Northern Ireland for the first time in the 2011 local elections, citing dissatisfaction with Sinn Féin's involvement in the Northern Ireland Executive, and claiming there was "a real appetite for a radical voice" in Northern Irish politics. The party ran candidates for the first time in the Republic of Ireland during the 2014 local elections in Ireland, simultaneously running two candidates in the 2014 Northern Irish local elections. The party didn't succeed in getting any of its eight candidates elected in the 2014 local elections, leaving it without elected representation. Three candidates ran for the party in the 2019 local elections in Ireland, none were successful.

The party has become known for the use of nonviolent direct action and regular protests in Belfast, Dublin, and elsewhere. It has launched a mobile app aimed at telling people their rights when they are stopped by the police. Éirígí has organised protests against the visits of Britain's Queen Elizabeth and Princess Anne to Ireland. In May 2011, Éirígí organized protests against Queen Elizabeth II's state visit to Ireland, including a public march on Dublin Castle and the establishment of an "Irish Freedom Camp" near the Garden of Remembrance. The group issued flyers and statements criticizing the visit as a celebration of British imperialism and calling for Irish unity and sovereignty.

In 2012, Ursula Ní Shionnáin (also known as Ursula Shannon), a member of Éirígí, was among four people charged under the Offences against the State Act with possessing weapons at Tullybeg, County Offaly, following an investigation by the Garda Special Detective Unit. Ní Shionnáin and others were convicted by the Special Criminal Court in 2014. The party's press officer, Stephen Murney, was also taken into custody in November 2012 by the PSNI on terrorism charges for owning and publishing historical photographs of police officers on duty, though he was later acquitted and cleared of all charges.

In 2021 Éirígí successfully brought legal action against the Irish state broadcaster RTÉ after the programme Prime Time featured a segment in which social commentator John McGuirk stated that members of Éirígí had been involved in the murder of Lyra McKee. McGuirk admitted after the programme that he had meant another republican group, Saoradh, not Éirígí. RTÉ agreed to a settlement with Éirígí that saw RTÉ pay €20,000 to three charity groups; Inner City Helping Homeless (€5,000), the Capuchin Day Centre (€5,000) and the Lyra McKee Investigative Journalism Training Bursary (€10,000).

== Ideology ==
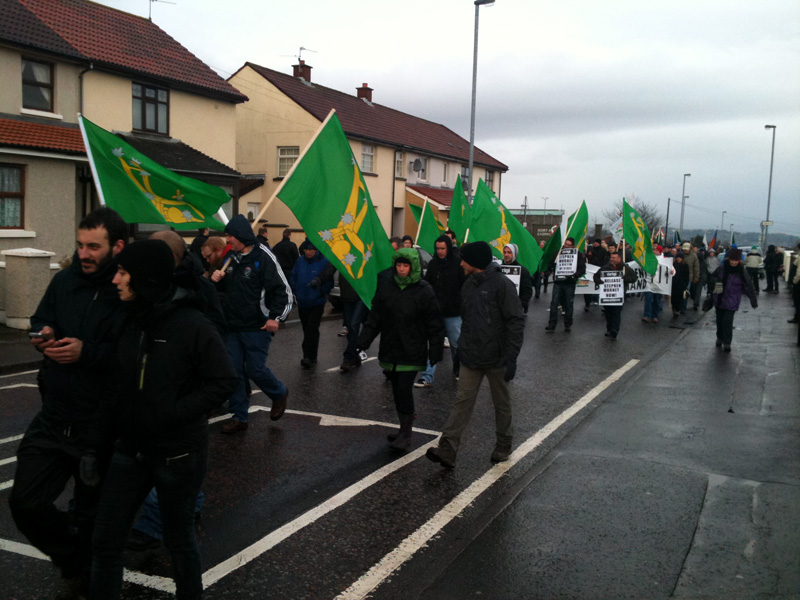
Members of Éirígí marching in Derry with starry plough flags, January 2013

The party seeks the removal of Northern Ireland from the United Kingdom, and the establishment of a 32-county republic based on socialist principles. Éirígí has participated in a range of campaigns, including Shell to Sea and Reclaim the Republic (which involved the organisation distributing 60,000 1916 Proclamations nationwide), the Right2Water Campaign, the campaign to Repeal The 8th Amendment, and their UP Housing campaign, which calls for the state to introduce a universal public housing system where all citizens have the legal right to rent a high-quality, affordable home regardless of their income. They also actively promote the restoration of the Irish language to widespread everyday use across Ireland.

The party opposes the Israeli occupation of Palestine, and supports the Boycott, Divestment and Sanctions (BDS) movement.

The twentieth Independent Monitoring Commission report of 2008 said the group is "a small political grouping based on revolutionary socialist principles". While it continues to be a political association, albeit, with aggressive protest activities, it was not seen as paramilitary in nature.

Éirígí campaigned for a No vote in Ireland's 2009 Lisbon Treaty referendum. It campaigned for the United Kingdom to leave the European Union, describing the EU as "very much anchored in Neo-Liberal policies such as privatisation and austerity and programmes that have been enforced on countries such as Greece and Spain".

== Leadership ==
Éirígí's National Executive is responsible for the day-to-day running of the party between meetings of the Ardfheis (Party conference). It is elected by the membership annually on a 'one member – one vote' basis. The chairpersons of each local branch are also members of the National Executive.

== Electoral results ==
Éirigí election results
Election	Candidates	Elected	±	First Pref votes	%	Rank	Leader
2011 Northern Irish Local	2	0	Steady	2,062	0.03	12th	Brian Leeson
2014 Northern Irish Local	2	0	Steady	1,756	0.03	13th	Brian Leeson
2014 Irish Local	6	0	Steady	3,120	0.18	14th	Brian Leeson
2019 Irish Local	3	0	Steady	1,547	0.09	16th	Brian Leeson
