= Brendan Carr (politician) =

Irish politician

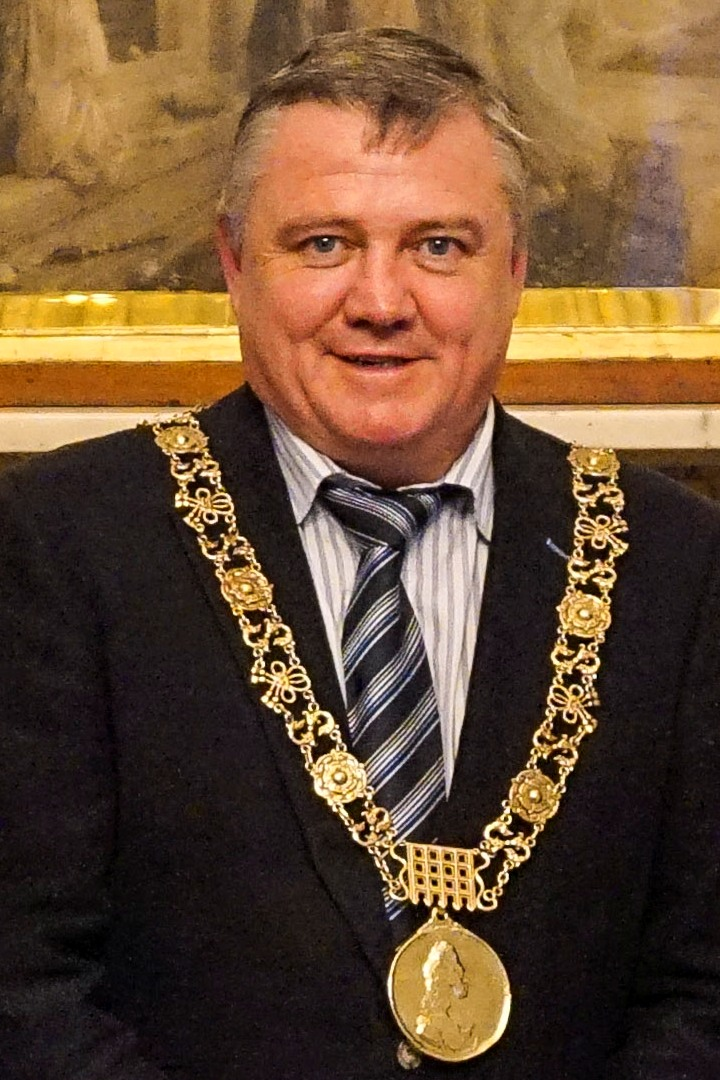
- Carr in 2016

Dublin City Councillor
- In office May 2014 – May 2019
- Constituency: Cabra–Glasnevin
- In office June 1999 – June 2009
- Constituency: Cabra–Finglas

Lord Mayor of Dublin
- In office June 2016 – June 2017
- Preceded by: Críona Ní Dhálaigh
- Succeeded by: Mícheál Mac Donncha

Personal details
- Born: Dublin, Ireland
- Party: Labour
- Education: National College of Ireland

Brendan Carr is an Irish Labour politician and former member of Dublin City Council. He served as the Lord Mayor of Dublin from 2016 to 2017.

He was first elected to Dublin City Council at the 1999 local elections as a member for the Cabra-Glasnevin local electoral area. He was re-elected in 2004 but did not contest the 2009 local elections because his son Jason was born that year. He returned to Dublin City Council representing the Cabra-Finglas area at the 2014 Local Elections.

Carr is a SIPTU trade union official.

He was elected Lord Mayor of Dublin in June 2016 with 34 votes from Labour, Fine Gael, Sinn Féin, the Green Party and Independents beating PBPA candidate Tina McVeigh (9 votes) and Fianna Fáil candidate Paul McAuliffe (8 votes).

In his first speech to Dublin City Council as Lord Mayor, Carr said that following the UK's vote to leave the European Union on 23 June 2016, he would contact Mayor of London Sadiq Khan "to establish a working group to ensure..strong bonds" were maintained between the two capital cities.

In a discussion on the proposed Liffey Cycle Route, he commented that "he does not know of anyone who brings bags of shopping (groceries) on bicycles" in response to the economic disadvantages of the cycle route, saying that if there were no cars .

Civic offices
Preceded by Críona Ní Dhálaigh	Lord Mayor of Dublin; 2016–2017	Succeeded by Mícheál Mac Donncha
