= Hazel De Nortúin =

Irish politician

Dublin City Councillor
- Incumbent
- Assumed office 2016
- Constituency: Ballyfermot-Drimnagh

Personal details
- Born: Dublin, Ireland
- Party: People Before Profit
- Other political affiliations: People Before Profit–Solidarity

Hazel De Nortúin is an Irish politician who has served on Dublin City Council since 2016. She is a member of People Before Profit.

== Early life ==
De Nortúin is from Cherry Orchard. She attended Gaelscoil Inse Chór, an Irish language medium primary school in Islandbridge, and studied engineering at university.

A fluent Irish speaker, De Nortúin is an advocate for Irish-language education and became involved in politics when she sought to address the lack of local Irish-language schooling options after her child was unable to attend the gaelscoil De Nortúin had herself attended. This led to her co-founding Teanga Beo Naíonra, a non-for-profit Irish-language crèche in the area, with help from Bríd Smith. De Nortúin later opened an Irish-language café in Ballyfermot.

== Political career ==
De Nortúin was co-opted to Dublin City Council in 2016 to represent the local electoral area of Ballyfermot–Drimnagh in place of party colleague Bríd Smith, who was elected to the Dáil.

In her first election, De Nortúin retained her seat, placing second, at the 2019 Irish local elections and did so again at the 2024 Irish local elections.

De Nortúin has advocated for greater maternity provision for councillors after having a child while serving on the council.

In 2023, she made a criminal complaint against Taoiseach Leo Varadkar over his donation statements. A criminal case was not progressed by the Garda Síochána.

In 2024, De Nortúin was selected by People Before Profit to contest Dublin South-Central at the general election after Bríd Smith chose not to run again. De Nortúin was not elected.
