= Oisín Quinn =

Irish politician and judge (born 1969)

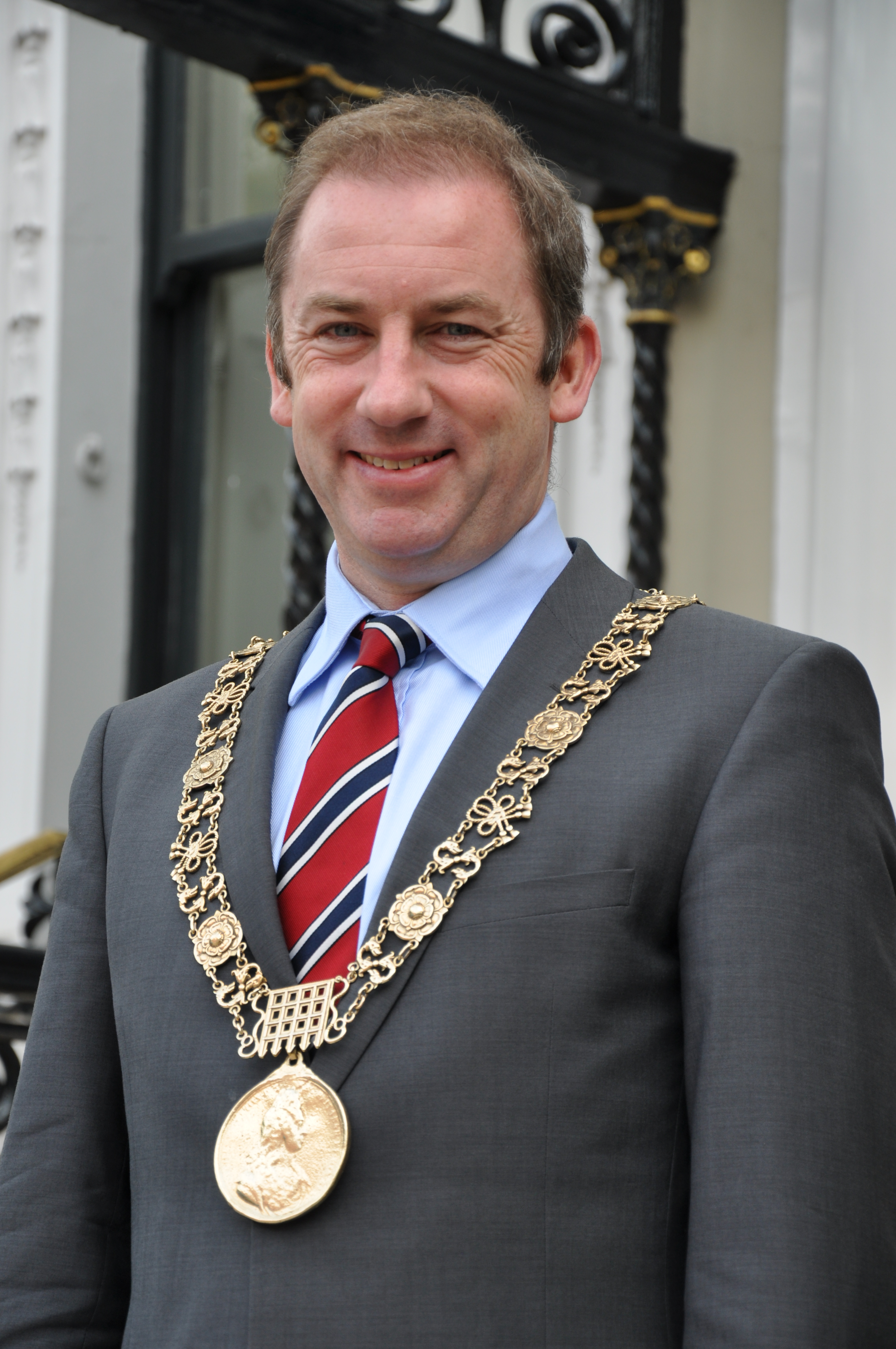
- Quinn in 2013

Judge of the High Court
- Incumbent
- Assumed office 6 July 2023
- Nominated by: Government of Ireland
- Appointed by: Michael D. Higgins

Lord Mayor of Dublin
- In office 12 June 2013 – 12 June 2014
- Preceded by: Naoise Ó Muirí
- Succeeded by: Christy Burke

Personal details
- Born: 16 May 1969 (age 57) London, England
- Party: Labour Party
- Spouse: Jennifer O'Connell
- Children: 4
- Parent: Lochlann Quinn (father)
- Relatives: Ruairi Quinn (uncle)
- Education: University College Dublin; London School of Economics

Oisín Quinn (born 16 May 1969) is an Irish judge, lawyer, and former politician who has served as a Judge of the High Court since July 2023. He previously served as Lord Mayor of Dublin from 2013 to 2014, having served as a member of Dublin City Council from 2004 to 2014.

== Early life ==
Quinn was educated at Castleknock College. He studied law at University College Dublin and the University of London, and qualified as a barrister from the King's Inns in 1992.

His uncle is the former Labour Party leader Ruairi Quinn. He is the son of a former AIB Director Lochlann Quinn.

== Political career ==
Quinn was first elected to Dublin City Council in the 2004 Irish local elections for the Rathmines local electoral area. Quinn was an unsuccessful candidate for Dáil Éireann in the Dún Laoghaire constituency at the 2007 general election. He was re-elected in June 2009 for the Pembroke-Rathmines electoral area, and was elected Lord Mayor of Dublin in 2013.

In 2013, called for the direct election of Dublin's mayor, saying that direct election is a necessity if Dublin wants to compete with other similarly sized cities across Europe.

He lost his council seat at the 2014 local elections.

== Legal career ==
Quinn was called to the Bar in 1992 and became a senior counsel in 2008.

== Judicial career ==
He was nominated to the High Court in June 2023 and appointed in July 2023.

In 2025, he issued a judgment to permanently shut down three of the six wind turbines at the Gibbet Hill wind farm in Wexford, Ireland on the basis of noise complaints.

== Personal life ==
He is married to Jennifer O'Connell; and they have four children.

Civic offices
Preceded by Naoise Ó Muirí	Lord Mayor of Dublin; 2013–2014	Succeeded by Christy Burke
