= Críona Ní Dhálaigh =

Irish politician (born 1962)

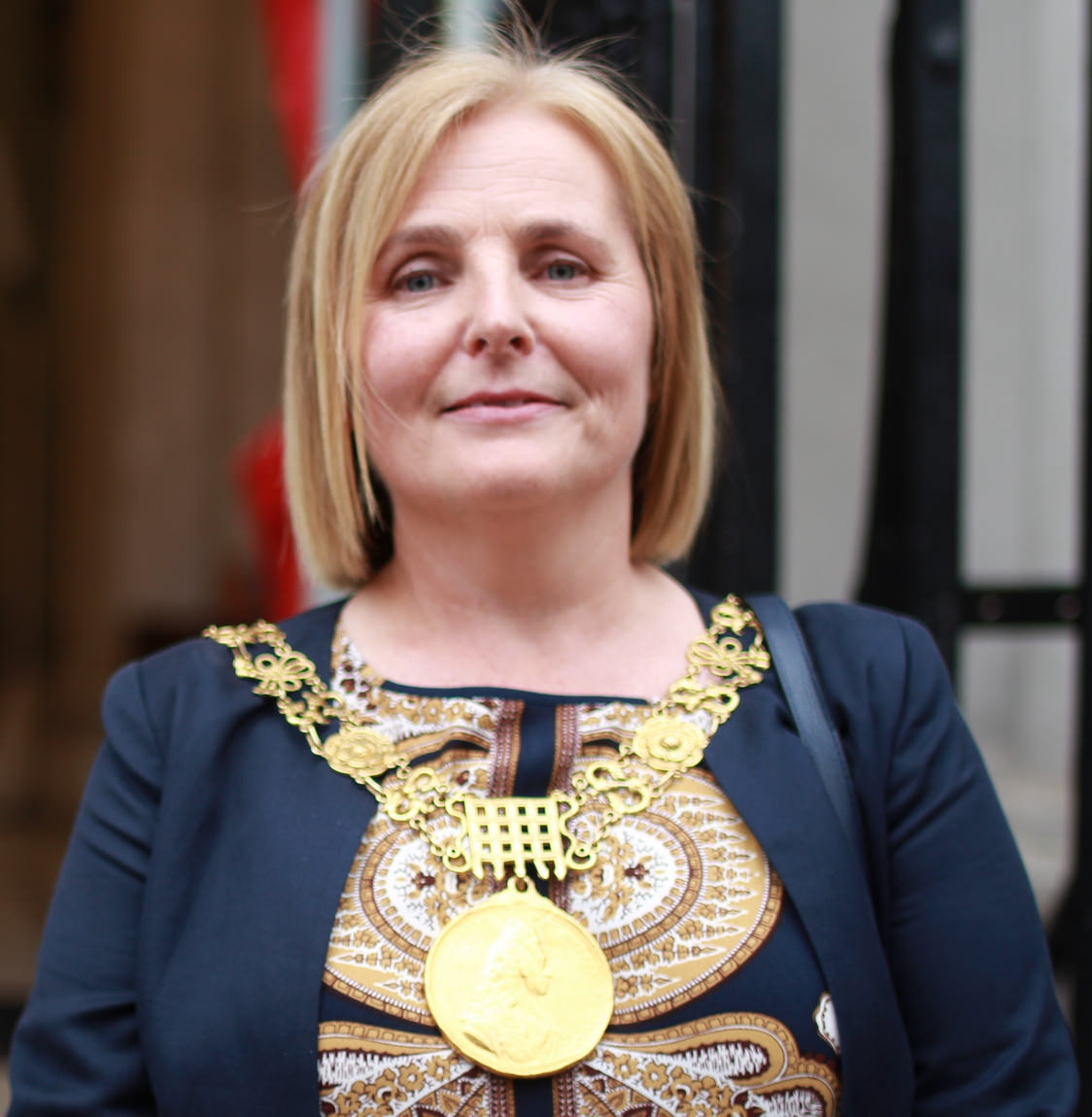
- Ní Dhálaigh in 2015

Dublin City Councillor
- In office 21 March 2006 – September 2020
- Constituency: South West Inner City

Lord Mayor of Dublin
- In office 5 June 2015 – 6 June 2016
- Preceded by: Christy Burke
- Succeeded by: Brendan Carr

Personal details
- Born: 11 February 1962 (age 64) Dublin, Ireland
- Party: Sinn Féin

Críona Ní Dhálaigh (born 11 February 1962) is an Irish Sinn Féin politician who served as Lord Mayor of Dublin from 2015 to 2016. She was the first Sinn Féin Lord Mayor to take office. (Note: In 1920, Thomas Kelly of Sinn Féin was unanimously elected as Lord Mayor of Dublin while being held in Wormwood Scrubs prison in England. Due to his imprisonment, he was unable to formally take up the position.) She was a Dublin City Councillor from March 2006 to September 2020.

She was co-opted onto Dublin City Council in 2006, to fill a vacancy caused by the resignation of Andrew O'Connell. She was elected in 2009 for the South West Inner City area and in 2014 for the Crumlin-Kimmage area.

== Notes ==
Civic offices
| Preceded by Christy Burke | Lord Mayor of Dublin; 2015–2016 | Succeeded by Brendan Carr |
