= Naoise Ó Muirí =

Irish politician (born 1972)

Naoise Ó Muirí TD
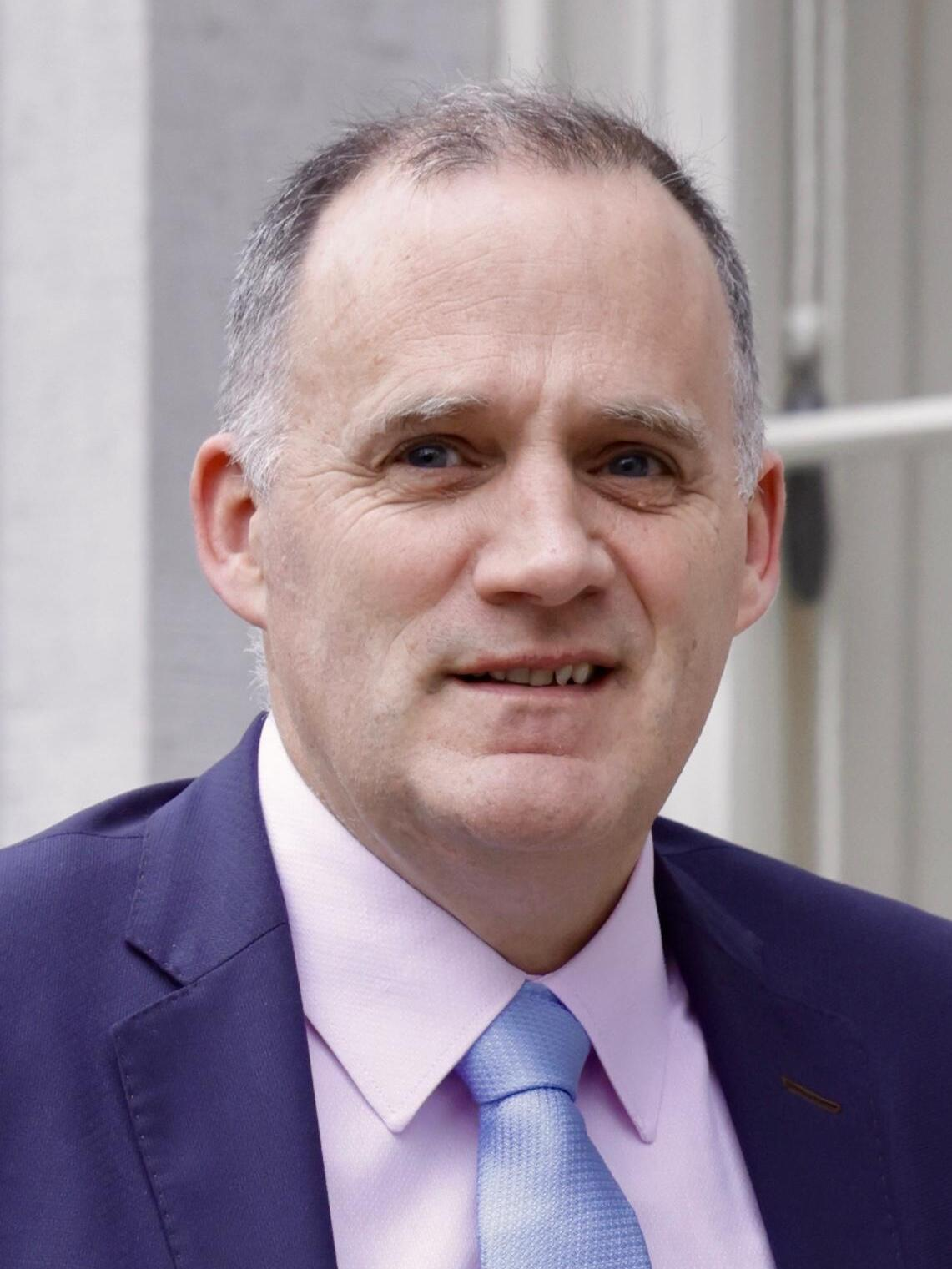
- Ó Muirí in 2025

Teachta Dála
- Incumbent
- Assumed office November 2024
- Constituency: Dublin Bay North

Lord Mayor of Dublin
- In office 6 June 2012 – 7 June 2013
- Preceded by: Andrew Montague
- Succeeded by: Oisín Quinn

Personal details
- Born: 15 September 1972 (age 53) Galway, Ireland
- Party: Fine Gael
- Spouse: Fionnuala Uí Mhuirí (m. 2006)
- Children: 3
- Education: NUI Galway
- Website: naoise.ie

Naoise Ó Muirí (born 15 September 1972) is an Irish Fine Gael politician who has been a Teachta Dála (TD) for the Dublin Bay North constituency since the 2024 general election. He served as a Dublin City Councillor from June 2004 to November 2024. He previously served as Lord Mayor of Dublin from 2012 to 2013.

== Career ==
He was first elected to Dublin City Council in the 2004 local elections as a member for the Clontarf local electoral area and was re-elected in June 2009.

He was an unsuccessful candidate in the Dublin North-Central constituency at the 2011 general election. He stood again for the Dáil at the 2016 general election for Fine Gael in the new Dublin Bay North constituency, but was again unsuccessful.

He was elected Lord Mayor of Dublin in June 2012 with 32 votes from Fine Gael and the Labour Party, beating the independent councillor Mannix Flynn by 6 votes and 11 abstentions.

At the 2024 general election, Ó Muirí was elected to the 34th Dáil. He was subsequently appointed the Cathaoirleach of the Committee on Climate, Environment and Energy.

== Personal life ==
Ó Muirí is married with three children. He is a member of the Institution of Engineers of Ireland.

Ó Muirí studied at the NUI Galway. He is a self-employed engineer and runs his own technology company.

Civic offices
Preceded by Andrew Montague	Lord Mayor of Dublin; 2012–2013	Succeeded by Oisín Quinn

Dáil	Election	Deputy (Party)	Deputy (Party)	Deputy (Party)	Deputy (Party)	Deputy (Party)
32nd	2016	Denise Mitchell (SF)	Tommy Broughan (I4C)	Finian McGrath (Ind.)	Seán Haughey (FF)	Richard Bruton (FG)
33rd	2020	Denise Mitchell (SF)	Cian O'Callaghan (SD)	Aodhán Ó Ríordáin (Lab)	Seán Haughey (FF)	Richard Bruton (FG)
34th	2024	Denise Mitchell (SF)	Cian O'Callaghan (SD)	Barry Heneghan (Ind.)	Tom Brabazon (FF)	Naoise Ó Muirí (FG)
