= Paul McAuliffe =

Irish politician (born 1977

Paul McAuliffe TD
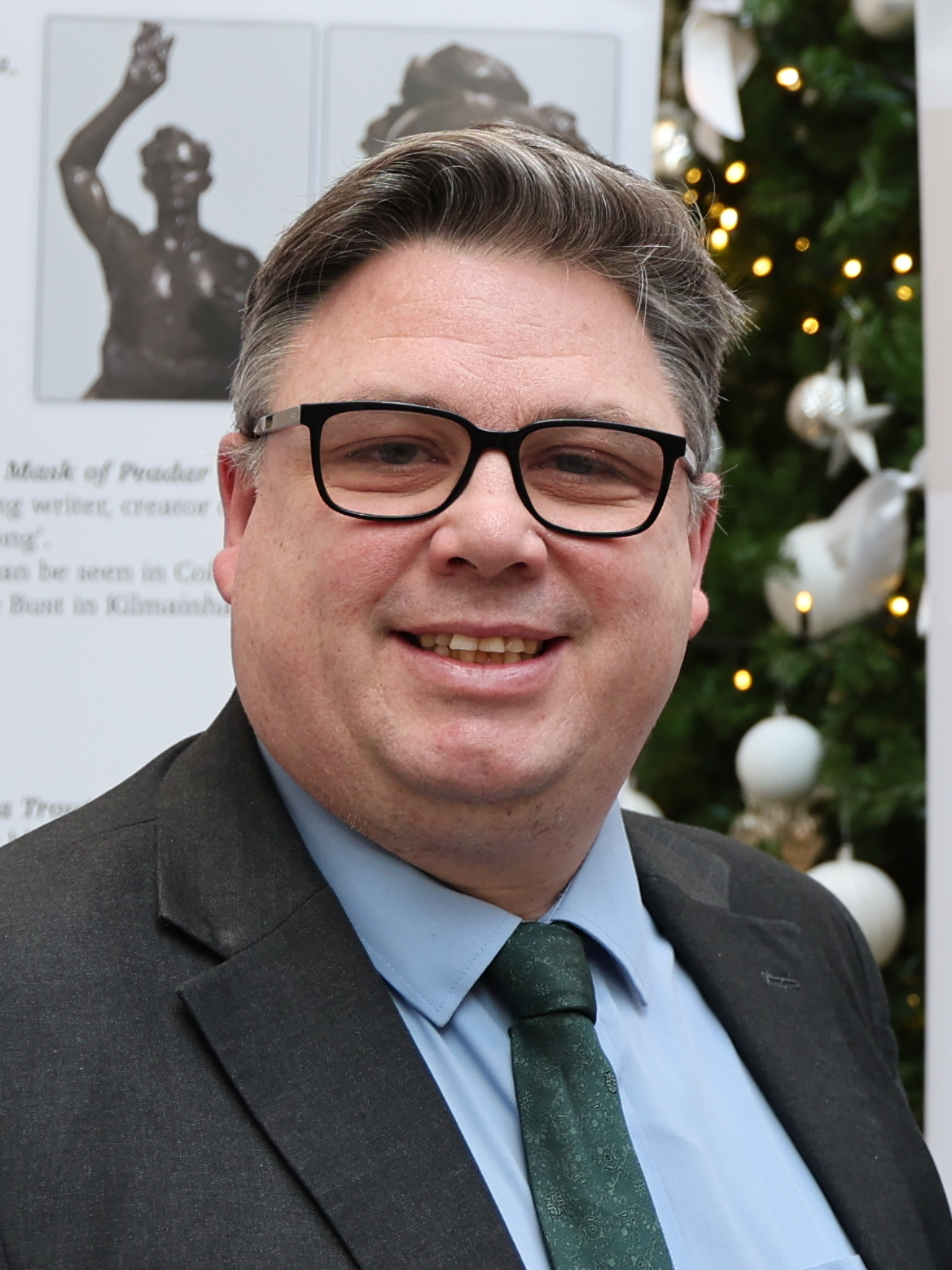
- McAuliffe in 2025

Teachta Dála
- Incumbent
- Assumed office February 2020
- Constituency: Dublin North-West

Lord Mayor of Dublin
- In office 12 June 2019 – 13 February 2020
- Preceded by: Nial Ring
- Succeeded by: Tom Brabazon

Personal details
- Born: 8 February 1977 (age 49) Dublin, Ireland
- Party: Fianna Fáil
- Other political affiliations: Progressive Democrats (until 2004)
- Education: National College of Ireland

Paul McAuliffe (born 8 February 1977) is an Irish Fianna Fáil politician who has been a Teachta Dála (TD) for the Dublin North-West constituency since the 2020 general election. He previously served as Lord Mayor of Dublin from 2019 to 2020.

== Early political career ==
He was a member of the Young Progressive Democrats. McAuliffe contested the 2004 local elections as a Progressive Democrats candidate in Finglas local electoral area, but was not elected. He was first elected as a member of Dublin City Council in 2009, for Fianna Fáil in the Ballymun-Finglas local electoral area. He was re-elected following the 2014 local elections for the enlarged Ballymun local electoral area. Following the 2019 local elections, he was re-elected for Ballymun-Finglas local electoral area.

In 2014, he was elected as leader of the Fianna Fáil group. In 2015, McAuliffe drafted the Moore Street Area Renewal and Development Bill 2015. As chairperson of Enterprise and Economic Development, he jointly delivered the Dublin City Local Economic and Community Plan and the policy Document Dublin A City of Villages. He was chairperson of Dublin City Council's Enterprise and Economic Development Strategic Policy Committee. and the Local Community Development Committee.

In June 2019, he was elected as the Lord Mayor of Dublin, succeeding Nial Ring. McAuliffe was supported by Fianna Fáil, Green Party, Labour Party and the Social Democrats.

== Dáil Éireann ==
McAuliffe was selected to be the Fianna Fáil candidate for Dublin North-West at the 2016 general election. McAuliffe was not elected, being the last candidate to be eliminated on the 9th count. He unsuccessfully contested the 2016 election to Seanad Éireann.

At the 2020 general election, McAuliffe was elected on the final count.

At the 2024 general election, McAuliffe was re-elected to the Dáil. He was subsequently appointed Leas-Cathaoirleach of the influential Public Accounts Committee.

Civic offices
Preceded by Nial Ring	Lord Mayor of Dublin; 2019–2020	Succeeded by Tom Brabazon

Dáil	Election	Deputy (Party)	Deputy (Party)	Deputy (Party)	Deputy (Party)
2nd	1921	Philip Cosgrave (SF)	Joseph McGrath (SF)	Richard Mulcahy (SF)	Michael Staines (SF)
3rd	1922	Philip Cosgrave (PT-SF)	Joseph McGrath (PT-SF)	Richard Mulcahy (PT-SF)	Michael Staines (PT-SF)
4th	1923	Constituency abolished. See Dublin North			

Dáil	Election	Deputy (Party)	Deputy (Party)	Deputy (Party)	Deputy (Party)	Deputy (Party)
9th	1937	Seán T. O'Kelly (FF)	A. P. Byrne (Ind.)	Cormac Breathnach (FF)	Patrick McGilligan (FG)	Archie Heron (Lab)
10th	1938	Seán T. O'Kelly (FF)	A. P. Byrne (Ind.)	Cormac Breathnach (FF)	Patrick McGilligan (FG)	Eamonn Cooney (FF)
11th	1943	Seán T. O'Kelly (FF)	A. P. Byrne (Ind.)	Cormac Breathnach (FF)	Patrick McGilligan (FG)	Martin O'Sullivan (Lab)
12th	1944	Seán T. O'Kelly (FF)	John S. O'Connor (FF)	Cormac Breathnach (FF)	Patrick McGilligan (FG)	Martin O'Sullivan (Lab)
12th	1945 by-election	Vivion de Valera (FF)	John S. O'Connor (FF)	Cormac Breathnach (FF)	Patrick McGilligan (FG)	Martin O'Sullivan (Lab)
13th	1948	Mick Fitzpatrick (CnaP)	A. P. Byrne (Ind.)	Cormac Breathnach (FF)	3 seats from 1948 to 1969	
14th	1951	Declan Costello (FG)	A. P. Byrne (Ind.)	Cormac Breathnach (FF)	3 seats from 1948 to 1969	
14th	1952 by-election	Declan Costello (FG)	Thomas Byrne (Ind.)	Cormac Breathnach (FF)	3 seats from 1948 to 1969	
15th	1954	Declan Costello (FG)	Thomas Byrne (Ind.)	Richard Gogan (FF)	3 seats from 1948 to 1969	
16th	1957	Declan Costello (FG)	Thomas Byrne (Ind.)	Richard Gogan (FF)	3 seats from 1948 to 1969	
17th	1961	Declan Costello (FG)	Michael Mullen (Lab)	Richard Gogan (FF)	3 seats from 1948 to 1969	
18th	1965	Declan Costello (FG)	Michael Mullen (Lab)	Richard Gogan (FF)	3 seats from 1948 to 1969	
19th	1969	Hugh Byrne (FG)	Jim Tunney (FF)	Richard Gogan (FF)	David Thornley (Lab)	4 seats from 1969 to 1977
20th	1973	Hugh Byrne (FG)	Jim Tunney (FF)	Richard Gogan (FF)	David Thornley (Lab)	4 seats from 1969 to 1977
21st	1977	Constituency abolished. See Dublin Finglas and Dublin Cabra				

Dáil	Election	Deputy (Party)	Deputy (Party)	Deputy (Party)	Deputy (Party)
22nd	1981	Jim Tunney (FF)	Michael Barrett (FF)	Mary Flaherty (FG)	Hugh Byrne (FG)
23rd	1982 (Feb)	Jim Tunney (FF)	Michael Barrett (FF)	Mary Flaherty (FG)	Proinsias De Rossa (WP)
24th	1982 (Nov)	Jim Tunney (FF)	Michael Barrett (FF)	Mary Flaherty (FG)	Proinsias De Rossa (WP)
25th	1987	Jim Tunney (FF)	Michael Barrett (FF)	Mary Flaherty (FG)	Proinsias De Rossa (WP)
26th	1989	Jim Tunney (FF)	Michael Barrett (FF)	Mary Flaherty (FG)	Proinsias De Rossa (WP)
27th	1992	Noel Ahern (FF)	Róisín Shortall (Lab)	Mary Flaherty (FG)	Proinsias De Rossa (DL)
28th	1997	Noel Ahern (FF)	Róisín Shortall (Lab)	Pat Carey (FF)	Proinsias De Rossa (DL)
29th	2002	Noel Ahern (FF)	Róisín Shortall (Lab)	Pat Carey (FF)	3 seats from 2002
30th	2007	Noel Ahern (FF)	Róisín Shortall (Lab)	Pat Carey (FF)	3 seats from 2002
31st	2011	Dessie Ellis (SF)	Róisín Shortall (Lab)	John Lyons (Lab)	3 seats from 2002
32nd	2016	Dessie Ellis (SF)	Róisín Shortall (SD)	Noel Rock (FG)	3 seats from 2002
33rd	2020	Dessie Ellis (SF)	Róisín Shortall (SD)	Paul McAuliffe (FF)	3 seats from 2002
34th	2024	Dessie Ellis (SF)	Rory Hearne (SD)	Paul McAuliffe (FF)	3 seats from 2002
