= Mary Finlay Geoghegan =

Irish judge and lawyer

Judge of the Supreme Court
- In office 1 December 2017 – 16 June 2019
- Nominated by: Government of Ireland
- Appointed by: Michael D. Higgins

Judge of the Court of Appeal
- In office 29 October 2014 – 30 November 2017
- Nominated by: Government of Ireland
- Appointed by: Michael D. Higgins

Judge of the High Court
- In office 3 July 2002 – 28 October 2014
- Nominated by: Government of Ireland
- Appointed by: Mary McAleese

Personal details
- Born: Mary Finlay; 1949 (age 76–77) Naas, County Kildare, Ireland
- Party: Fine Gael
- Spouse: Hugh Geoghegan (m. 1981)
- Children: 3, including James
- Parent: Thomas Finlay (father)
- Relatives: Thomas Finlay (grandfather); John Blayney (uncle); James Geoghegan (father-in-law)
- Education: University College Dublin; College of Europe; Law Society of Ireland

Mary Finlay Geoghegan (née Finlay; born 1949) is a retired Irish judge and lawyer. She was appointed to the High Court in 2002 and promoted to a newly established Court of Appeal from 2014. She became a judge of the Supreme Court of Ireland from 2017, before retiring in 2019.

Finlay Geoghegan specialised in commercial law. She originally practised as a solicitor in a corporate law firm, before becoming a barrister where she had a broad commercial and civil practice.

Her judicial career included temporary positions at the European Court of Human Rights and the Referendum Commission.

== Early life ==
Finlay was born to Thomas Finlay and Alice Blayney. She is the eldest of five siblings. Her father was the Chief Justice of Ireland between 1985 and 1994. Her paternal grandfather Thomas Finlay was a Cumann na nGaedheal politician. Her mother was called to the Bar in 1946, though never practised. Her maternal uncle John Blayney was also a Supreme Court judge.

She was educated at Sacred Heart Convent, Monkstown, Dublin and obtained a double first BA in Mathematics and Mathematical Physics from University College Dublin. At UCD, she played for the university hockey team and in diving was a Leinster Junior champion. She was elected the first female auditor of the UCD L&H, serving between 1970 and 1971. She took over running the society at the age of 21 and described herself as being "an awfully logical person", on account of her mathematical background. Future Supreme Court judge Adrian Hardiman served on her L&H committee. The topic of her inaugural address was the "Just Society" and featured contributions from Mary Robinson, Declan Costello, and Brian Walsh.

She attended the Law Society of Ireland and later studied for a postgraduate course in EEC studies at the College of Europe, Bruges following qualification and on a scholarship.

== Legal career ==
=== Early career ===
She was admitted as a solicitor in 1973. She practised at McCann, FitzGerald, Roche and Dudley, where she was a partner.

Finlay was subsequently called to the bar in 1980. She devilled for Peter Kelly. As a junior counsel practice included commercial, injunctive and insolvency matters, including representing the Irish government in proceedings related to the 1985 collapse of the Insurance Corporation of Ireland. She was called to the Bar of England and Wales at Middle Temple in May 1987.

=== Senior Counsel ===
She became a Senior Counsel in 1988. She was called to Bar of Northern Ireland in 1989. She was also called to the New South Wales Bar Association in 1992. She continued practising in commercial matters, including employment and tax law disputes. She also appeared in immigration and personal injuries cases. She represented Paul McGuinness and Windmill Lane Productions in the judicial review of a decision of the Independent Radio and Television Commission to revoke a licence to establish TV3.

Finlay Geoghegan acted as an independent legal adviser to the State on matters of EC law in 1996. She acted for the Attorney General of Ireland in a reference made by President Mary Robinson under Article 26 of the Constitution of Ireland to the Supreme Court regarding the Employment Equality Bill of 1997. She appeared for RTÉ in constitutional cases in the Supreme Court regarding the need for equal time in referendums coverage.

She is a bencher at the King's Inns since 1996 and Middle Temple since 2012.

=== Other appointments ===
Finlay was appointed chair of the National Consumer Advisory Council in 1976. She has been a board member of the Dublin Gas Board, the Mater Misericordiae University Hospital and the Temple Street Children's University Hospital, where she was chair between 2001 and 2004.

She joined the Law Reform Commission in October 1980 as a part-time member to serve a five-year term. She was a convenor of the Constitution Review Group from 1995.

She is currently a board member of the National Children's Research Centre and a governor of the Royal Hospital, Donnybrook.

== Judicial career ==
=== High Court ===
She was appointed to the High Court in July 2002, following in the footsteps of her father. Her appointment came at the same time as Michael Peart, who was said to be the first solicitor to be appointed to the High Court, though she had previously been a solicitor. She was assigned to the Commercial list in 2004. Together with Peter Kelly, they were the first judges to preside over a newly established Commercial Court within the High Court in 2004 to hear cases which were complex or with a claim in excess of €1 million. She also has been in charge of the Examiners Court list and The Hague Convention on Child Abduction list.

She was an ad hoc judge of the European Court of Human Rights between 2009 and 2010. She was a member of the court which heard A, B and C v Ireland which found that Ireland had breached Article 8 of the European Convention on Human Rights for failure to provide abortion services.

=== Court of Appeal ===
The establishment of the Court of Appeal in 2014 led to her appointment as one of the first six ordinary judges to be appointed to the court. She was also a member of a working group convened prior to its foundation.

She served as chairperson of the Referendum Commission for the 31st Amendment of the Constitution of Ireland.

=== Supreme Court ===
On 7 November 2017, the Government of Ireland nominated her for appointment by the President of Ireland to the Supreme Court. She was appointed by the President on 1 December 2017.

Finlay Geoghegan retired as a judge on 16 June 2019. The Chief Justice Frank Clarke described her judicial contribution as "meticulous and firm" and marked by "an overlay of lightness and a deep underlay of humanity". Upon her retirement, she reflected on her belief in the need for more members of the judiciary to be appointed in Ireland in order for justice to be properly administered.

== Personal life ==
She married Hugh Geoghegan in 1981, who was also a Judge of the High Court and later a Judge of the Supreme Court. Geoghegan is the son of Supreme Court judge James Geoghegan. Finlay Geoghegan and Geoghegan have two daughters and a son, including James who is a barrister and TD for the constituency of Dublin Bay South since 2024 and was the Fine Gael candidate in the 2021 Dublin Bay South by-election. Geoghegan's husband died on 7 July 2024, at the age of 86.
