= James Geoghegan (Fine Gael politician) =

Irish politician

James Geoghegan TD
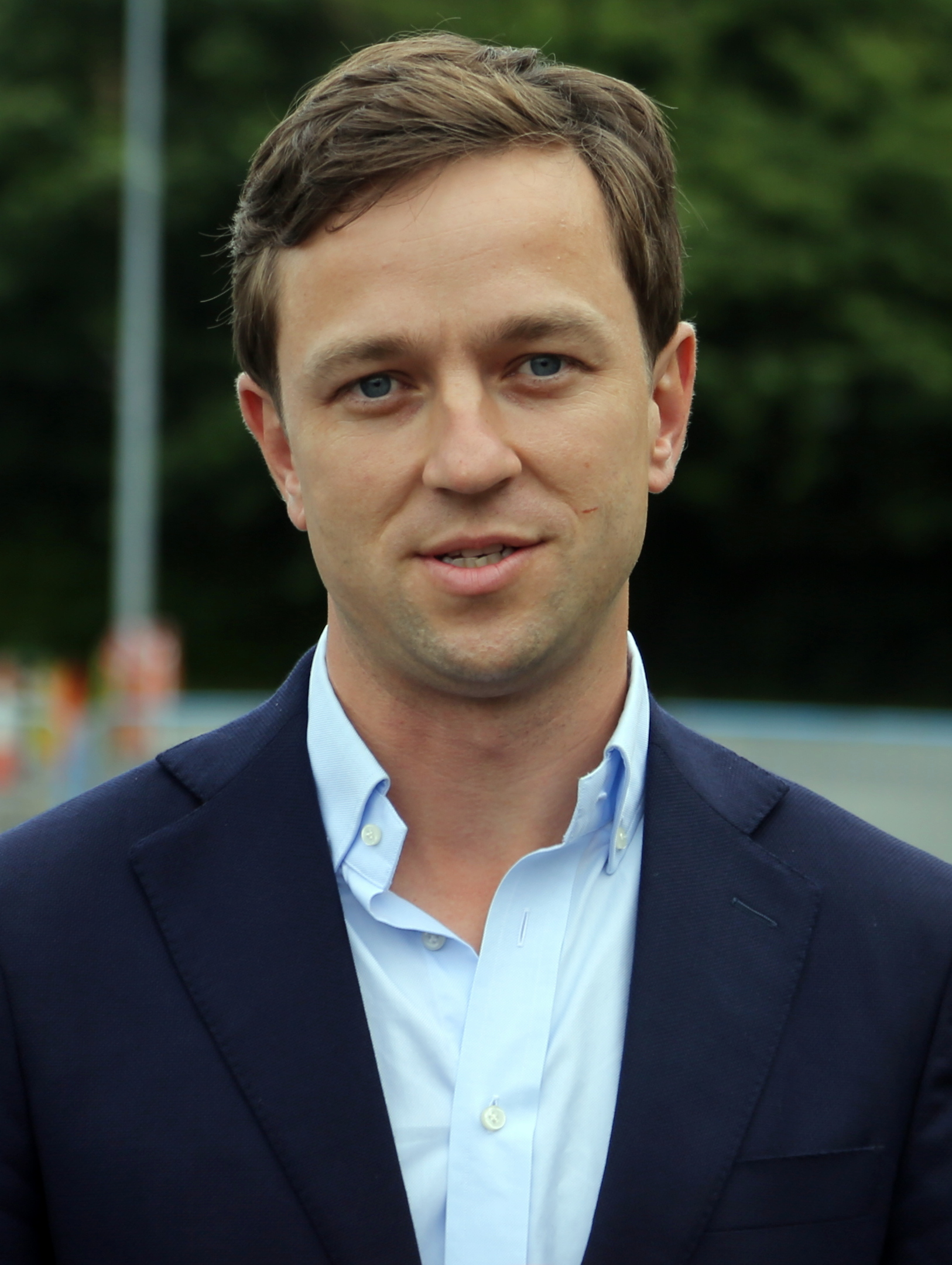
- Geoghegan in 2021

Teachta Dála
- Incumbent
- Assumed office November 2024
- Constituency: Dublin Bay South

Lord Mayor of Dublin
- In office 21 June 2024 – 30 November 2024
- Preceded by: Daithí de Róiste
- Succeeded by: Emma Blain

Personal details
- Born: 1985/1986 (age 39–40) Dublin, Ireland
- Party: Fine Gael
- Other political affiliations: Renua (c. 2015)
- Spouse: Claire Cummins (m. 2016)
- Children: 3
- Parents: Hugh Geoghegan (father); Mary Finlay Geoghegan (mother)
- Relatives: James Geoghegan (grandfather); Thomas Finlay (grandfather)
- Education: University College Dublin; King's Inns

James Geoghegan (born 1985/1986) is an Irish Fine Gael politician, who has been Teachta Dála (TD) for the Dublin Bay South constituency since the 2024 general election.

== Early life and family ==
Born in Ranelagh, Dublin, Geoghegan is a son of Hugh Geoghegan and Mary Finlay Geoghegan, both of whom served on the Supreme Court of Ireland. He has two sisters. Both his grandfathers, James Geoghegan and Thomas Finlay, also served on the Supreme Court.

He was educated at Gonzaga College. He has a degree in politics and sociology from University College Dublin and a barrister-at-law degree from King's Inns. He is a practising barrister.

== Political career ==
Geoghegan was a founding member of Renua in 2015 but later left the party. Lucinda Creighton, the founder of Renua, had been expelled from the Fine Gael parliamentary party when she voted against the Protection of Life During Pregnancy Bill 2013, which had permitted abortion under certain limited circumstances. Geoghegan said he disagreed with Creighton's "social views on abortion", and "I certainly don't share any of the social views that I suppose that party subsequently became associated with". He said that he voted in favour of the repeal of the Eighth Amendment of the Constitution permitting the Oireachtas to legislate for abortion, and in favour of the Thirty-fourth Amendment of the Constitution which legalised same-sex marriage.

He was elected for Fine Gael at the 2019 Dublin City Council election for the Pembroke area.

=== 2021 Dublin Bay South by-election ===
Geoghegan announced his intention to seek the Fine Gael nomination for the 2021 Dublin Bay South by-election on 30 April, noting that in the 2019 Dublin City Council election he had received the highest vote share of any Fine Gael candidate in Dublin. He also stressed that he had backed Leo Varadkar in the 2017 Fine Gael leadership election. Geoghegan won the support of all 12 party branches in Dublin Bay South. He was the only Fine Gael candidate to be nominated by party members as of the party deadline on 10 May, and was formally selected on 13 May.

Geoghegan described himself as "liberal and progressive" and described housing among his three main campaign priorities. He stated "I want to speak for a generation stuck in a rent trap or living in their parents' homes". When asked by journalists about his own circumstances, Geoghegan added that he had a mortgage on his home with his wife. He declined to comment on whether he had drawn on "the bank of mum and dad" for it, saying "we were lucky enough to put a deposit together" for the home.

Following an article in The Irish Times by columnist Una Mullally criticising what the author described as Geoghegan's privileged family background, Fine Gael requested that people focus on Geoghegan's politics. The Irish Daily Mail subsequently complained that Geoghegan was refusing to answer questions on political issues, especially Fine Gael housing policy. Similarly, two podcasts covering Irish politics, The Echo Chamber Podcast and Una & Andrea's United Ireland podcast, complained that they had reached out to Geoghegan for interviews but he had refused all offers. Both podcasts had featured several other election candidates over the course of the campaign.

Geoghegan received 7,052 (26.2%) first preference votes in the by-election, coming second to Labour's Ivana Bacik.

=== Lord Mayor of Dublin ===
Following the 2024 Dublin City Council election, a coalition was formed between Fine Gael, Fianna Fáil, the Green Party and Labour. As part of the agreement, Geoghegan became Lord Mayor of Dublin on 21 June 2024.

=== 2024 general election ===
Geoghegan was selected as a Fine Gael's candidate for the Dublin Bay South constituency at the 2024 general election, and he was elected on the ninth count.

Civic offices
Preceded by Daithí de Róiste	Lord Mayor of Dublin; Jun.–Dec. 2024	Succeeded by Emma Blain

Dáil	Election	Deputy (Party)	Deputy (Party)	Deputy (Party)	Deputy (Party)
32nd	2016	Eamon Ryan (GP)	Jim O'Callaghan (FF)	Kate O'Connell (FG)	Eoghan Murphy (FG)
33rd	2020	Eamon Ryan (GP)	Jim O'Callaghan (FF)	Chris Andrews (SF)	Eoghan Murphy (FG)
33rd	2021 by-election	Eamon Ryan (GP)	Jim O'Callaghan (FF)	Chris Andrews (SF)	Ivana Bacik (Lab)
34th	2024	James Geoghegan (FG)	Jim O'Callaghan (FF)	Eoin Hayes (SD)	Ivana Bacik (Lab)
