= Tony Ensor (rugby union, born 1949) =

Irish rugby union player

- Born: Anthony Howard Ensor; 17 August 1949 (age 77) Dublin, Ireland
- School: Gonzaga College
- University: University College Dublin
- Notable relatives: Thomas Finlay (uncle); John Blayney (uncle)
- Occupation(s): Rugby union player, solicitor

Rugby union career
Senior career
Years	Team	Apps	(Points)
	UCD	22	(22)
–	Wanderers		
International career
Years	Team	Apps	(Points)
1973–1978	Ireland	22	(31)

Anthony Howard Ensor (born 17 August 1949) is a former Irish rugby union player.

Ensor was born in Dublin, the second of five children. He is the nephew of the 7th Chief Justice of Ireland Thomas Finlay and Supreme Court judge John Blayney. Educated at Gonzaga College and UCD, he played for UCD and Wanderers. He made his international debut for Ireland on 10 March 1973 against Wales. He was capped 22 times for Ireland, winning his last cap against England on 18 March 1978.

A fullback, Ensor's only try for Ireland came in 1975 against France. He was also a goal kicker and scored a total of 31 points for his country. In 1976, he was also a member of the Ireland squad that toured New Zealand and Fiji.

A solicitor by profession, Ensor practises in Enniscorthy, County Wexford. He served as president of the Law Society of Ireland in 1999. He now lives in Ballinapark, Bunclody, County Wexford with his wife Beatrice. He has two children.
