= Constitution Review Group =

The Constitution Review Group (CRG) was a group established by the Irish government in 1995 to review the Constitution of Ireland and recommend amendments. The group was chaired by T. K. Whitaker and had fifteen members selected from different backgrounds, though lawyers predominated.

== Establishment ==
A Government of Renewal, the programme of the 24th government of Ireland established in December 1994, specified that a constitution review group would be established and its report would be the basis, not for direct government action, but rather for a subsequent cross-party committee. The government order establishing the CRG was made on 27 April 1995 and the group was launched on 11 May 1995. The terms of reference were:

to review the Constitution, and in the light of this review, to establish those areas where constitutional change may be desirable or necessary, with a view to assisting the all-Party Committee on the Constitution, to be established by the Oireachtas, in its work, in their review, the Croup should take into account that certain constitutional matters i.e. Articles 2 and 3, Divorce, the Right to Bail, Cabinet Confidentiality and Votes for Emigrants are the subject of separate consideration.

The excluded matters were already under consideration by the government:

- Articles 2 and 3 of the Constitution were being considered as part of the Northern Ireland peace process. Changes approved by a 1998 referendum came into effect in 1999.
- Divorce was enabled after a November 1995 referendum
- The right to bail was curtailed after a November 1996 referendum
- Cabinet confidentiality was relaxed after an October 1997 referendum
- The right of Irish expatriates to vote is still under consideration

== Members ==
The CRG had 15 members, including a chairman and three convenors. Their names and listed qualifications were as follows:

- Dr T. K. Whitaker (chairman)—Former Governor of Central Bank of Ireland
- David Byrne SC
- Dr Alpha Connelly—Legal Adviser, Department of Foreign Affairs
- Mary Finlay SC (Convenor)
- Dermot Gleeson SC Attorney General
- James Hamilton BL
- Mahon Hayes (Convenor)—Former permanent representative to the United Nations
- Gerard Hogan FTCD, BL—Law Lecturer, TCD
- Professor Áine Hyland—Professor of Education, UCD
- Dr Finóla Kennedy—Economist
- Professor Michael Laver FTCD—Professor of Political Science, TCD
- Dr Kathleen Lynch—Co-ordinator of Equality Studies, UCD
- Diarmaid McGuinness BL
- Dr Dermot Nally (Convenor) Retired public servant
- Dr Blathna Ruane BL

Whereas Gleeson and Hamilton as existing public servants received no remuneration, the others received IR£2,500, with £3,250 for convenors and £3,750 for the chairman. Hogan waived his fee and Lynch's was donated to her UCD department.

== Report ==
The CRG provided provisional reports on several issues to the Taoiseach on 20 December 1995. The full report was submitted on 31 May 1996 published on 3 July 1996, and laid before the houses of the Oireachtas the following day. It ran to 700 pages. The promised All-Party Oireachtas Committee on the Constitution was established (as an "informal" committee rather than a formal Oireachtas committee) on 3 July 1996 by the government with the agreement of opposition party leaders, taking the CRG report in its terms of reference, and availing of numerous documents produced by and for the CRG. The informal committee was reconstituted after the 1997 and 2002 elections with similar terms of reference and made 10 reports, each of which drew on the 1996 CRG report.

== Appraisal ==
The Oireachtas Committee described the CRG report as the most thorough analysis of the Constitution of Ireland ever made. Leo Flynn in European Public Law called it an "excellent study" and "valuable resource". Andrew Butler and Rory O'Connell in the Irish Jurist criticised the CRG for "failure to consider its reason for being, complacency, a lopsidedly legalistic perspective, and a lack of imagination".

== Sources ==
- Constitution Review Group (May 1996). Report of the Constitution Review Group (PDF). Government Publications. Vol. Pn 2632. Dublin: Stationery Office. ISBN 0-7076-2440-1.
