= Hugh Geoghegan =

Irish judge (1938–2024)

Judge of the Supreme Court
- In office 7 March 2000 – 14 May 2010
- Nominated by: Government of Ireland
- Appointed by: Mary McAleese

Judge of the High Court
- In office 11 December 1992 – 7 March 2000
- Nominated by: Government of Ireland
- Appointed by: Mary Robinson

Personal details
- Born: 16 May 1938 Athlone, County Westmeath, Ireland
- Died: 7 July 2024 (aged 86) Dublin, Ireland
- Party: Fianna Fáil
- Spouse: Mary Finlay Geoghegan (m. 1981)
- Children: 3, including James
- Parent: James Geoghegan (father)
- Relatives: Thomas Finlay (father-in-law)
- Education: University College Dublin; King's Inns

Hugh Geoghegan (16 May 1938 – 7 July 2024) was an Irish judge who served on the Supreme Court from 2000 to 2010 and on the High Court from 1992 to 2000.

== Early life ==
Geoghegan was born on 16 May 1938. His father James Geoghegan was a judge of the Supreme Court. He attended secondary school at Clongowes Wood College and received BCL and LLB degrees from University College Dublin. At UCD, he was the auditor of the University College Dublin Law Society between 1960 and 1961. He studied at the King's Inns in order to become a barrister.

== Legal career ==
Geoghegan was called to the Bar in 1962, becoming a senior counsel in 1977, practising in Dublin and the Midland Circuit. He was also called to the bar in Northern Ireland and in England and Wales.

Geoghegan was a Public Service Arbitrator from 1982 to 1992. In the 1980s he served on the Circuit Court Rules Committee. He also appeared before the tribunal of inquiry into the Stardust fire. He chaired a commission which recommended the formation of the Labour Relations Commission.

He was a bencher of Middle Temple.

== Judicial career ==
Geoghegan was appointed to the High Court in December 1992. He was elevated to the Supreme Court of Ireland in 2000, replacing Donal Barrington. He was appointed on 7 March 2000. He retired in May 2010 and was replaced by Liam McKechnie.

In his retirement he presided over citizenship ceremonies.

== Personal life ==
Hugh Geoghegan was married to Mary Finlay Geoghegan who also served as a judge of the Supreme Court, with whom he had two daughters and a son, James Geoghegan, who became Lord Mayor of Dublin shortly before his father's death.

Geoghegan died on 7 July 2024, at the age of 86.
