= Mahon Hayes =

Irish lawyer and ambassador

Francis Mahon Hayes (2 March 1930 – 26 June 2011) was an Irish lawyer and ambassador.

== Early life ==
He was educated in University College Dublin and King's Inns. Called to the bar in 1952, he practiced for a time before going to work at the Land Registry, moving later to the Department of Justice and then to the Department of External Affairs as it was then called.

== Career in foreign affairs ==
As assistant legal adviser in the department, he provided legal advice on the Free Trade Agreement with Britain signed in 1965. He was appointed legal adviser to the department in 1970. Together with the Attorney General's office, he was chief legal advisor on Ireland's entry to the European Economic Community in 1973.

During the Northern Ireland troubles he was involved in the case taken by Ireland against Britain before the European Court of Human Rights on ill-treatment of detainees.

He is best remembered for his role in matters relating to the United Nations Convention on the Law of the Sea. He had been responsible for Irish/British negotiations on delimiting the continental shelf. These negotiations had not concluded before the Third United Nations Conference on the Law of the Sea and continued in that forum. After ten years of negotiations, the Conference successfully concluded the Convention. He played an important part as Ireland's representative at that conference, and was chosen to represent about 30 other countries on issues of shared concern. He later wrote a history of Ireland's role in the Conference.

In 1977 Hayes became Ambassador to Denmark, while still attending the Law of the Sea Conference which lasted until 1982. He subsequently became head of mission at the UN, first at Geneva and later in New York. Hayes served on the International Law Commission 1987 -1991, the only Irish person to have done so. After his return to headquarters Hayes served as deputy secretary of the Department of Foreign Affairs until his retirement in 1995.

== Later life ==
After retirement he served on the Constitution of Ireland Review Group under T.K. Whitaker. He acted as consultant to the Palestinian Authority on the drafting of a constitution and advised the Institute for European Affairs on a constitution for the EU.

== Publications ==
- Hayes, Mahon, The Law of the Sea: the role of the Irish Delegation at the Third United Nations Conference , Royal Irish Academy, 2011.
- Hayes, Mahon and Kingston, James, Ireland in international law: the pursuit of sovereignty and independence, in Tonra, Ben and others, Irish Foreign Policy, 2012.
