= Eco Eye =

Irish television series

- Genre: Environmental
- Starring: Duncan Stewart
- Country of origin: Ireland
- Original language: English

Production
- Running time: 30 minutes

Original release
- Network: RTÉ One
- Release: 2001 – 2023

Eco Eye is an Irish television series broadcast on RTÉ One. The series brought to light pressing ecological issues. Presented by Duncan Stewart, this presenter-led advocacy documentary made compelling economic and social cases for solving environmental challenges.

== Format ==
Eco Eye's reputation for breathtaking cinematography is well-deserved, showcasing stunning scenic filming and awe-inspiring aerial photography. Every Tuesday at 7pm, audiences tuned in to witness the program's insightful exploration of various ecological concerns.

Originally airing on Wednesdays at 7.30pm, the show made a strategic move to captivate an even wider audience on Tuesdays at 7pm in the late 2000s. In 2023, after 21 years Eco Eye concluded its remarkable run with a final six-part series, airing on Thursdays at 8pm. This concluding season delved into the urgent need to combat pollution while also shedding light on the revitalization of Ireland's closed railway lines.

Eco Eye's thought-provoking narrative, focused on safeguarding the environment and creating a sustainable future.

== Presenters ==
- Duncan Stewart
- Lara Dungan
- Anja Murray

== Broadcast ==
The show aired in Ireland on RTÉ One and RTÉ Player. The show was also available in Australia through ABC and their iView on-demand platform In Australia the show is called Eco Eye: Sustainable Solutions.
