= Caroline Conroy =

Irish politician

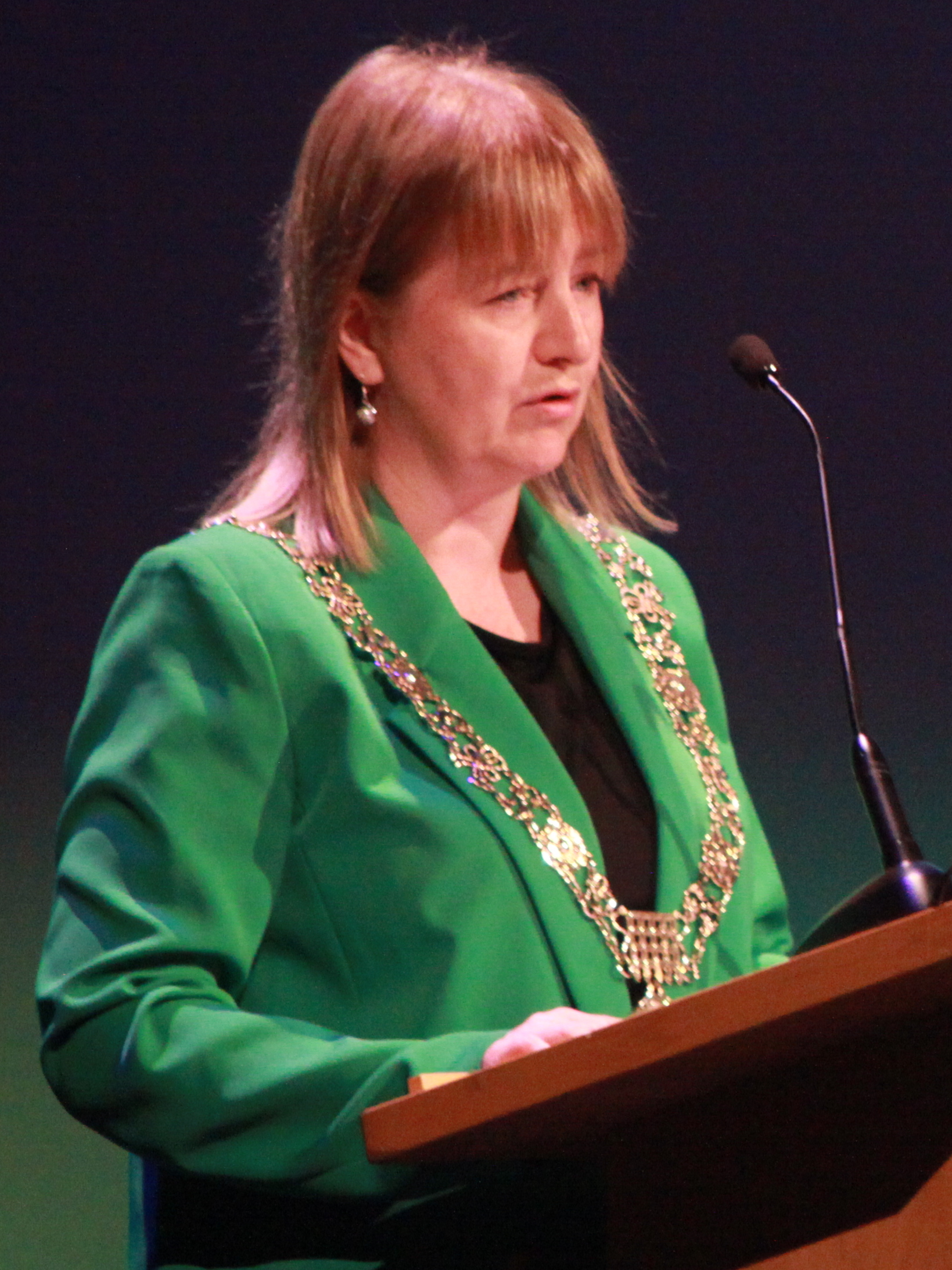
- Conroy in 2022

Lord Mayor of Dublin
- In office 27 June 2022 – 26 June 2023
- Preceded by: Alison Gilliland
- Succeeded by: Daithí de Róiste

Dublin City Councillor
- In office May 2019 – June 2024
- Constituency: Ballymun-Finglas

Personal details
- Party: Green Party
- Education: Dublin City University

Caroline Conroy is an Irish Green Party politician who served as Lord Mayor of Dublin from June 2022 to June 2023.

Conroy grew up in the Ballymun Flats, and ran for local election in the area in 2014. She was first elected in the 2019 local elections, for the Ballymun-Finglas local electoral area in Dublin City Council. In June 2022, she was elected as Lord Mayor of Dublin, succeeding Alison Gilliland.

In her term she was highly critical of anti-immigrant protests in Ballymun and across Dublin, which she said were organised by the far-right, branding the protests "really embarrassing" and "not what we are about in Ballymun."

She awarded Greta Thunberg and Duncan Stewart the Freedom of the City of Dublin at the end of her term, the first time the award acknowledged the role of environmental activists.

She lost her seat at the 2024 local elections.

Civic offices
Preceded by Alison Gilliland	Lord Mayor of Dublin; 2022–2023	Succeeded by Daithí de Róiste
