= Alison Gilliland =

Irish former politician (born 1968)

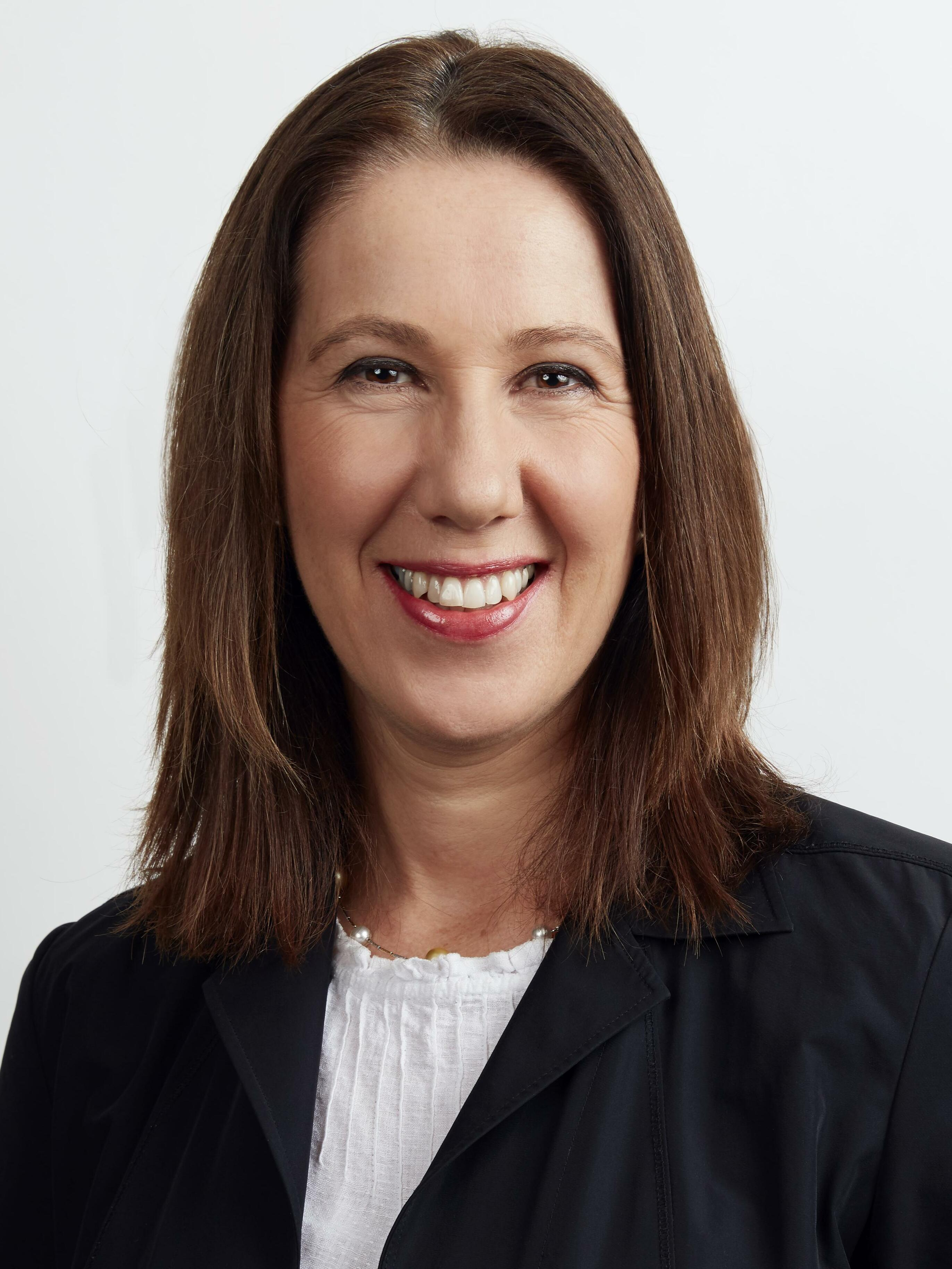
- Gilliland in 2019

Dublin City Councillor
- In office 24 May 2014 – 7 June 2024
- Constituency: Artane-Whitehall

Lord Mayor of Dublin
- In office 29 June 2021 – 27 June 2022
- Preceded by: Hazel Chu
- Succeeded by: Caroline Conroy

Personal details
- Born: 1968 (age 57–58) Drogheda, County Louth, Ireland
- Party: Labour Party
- Education: Church of Ireland College of Education; Dublin City University; University of Nottingham

Alison Gilliland (born 1968) is an Irish former Labour Party politician who served as Lord Mayor of Dublin from 2021 to 2022.

In June 2021, she was elected as Lord Mayor of Dublin, succeeding Hazel Chu. Gilliland was elected unopposed, and supported by the Labour Party, Fianna Fáil, Green Party, and the Social Democrats.

She was elected to Dublin City Council (DCC) for the Artane-Whitehall local electoral area in 2014. She chaired the DCC Strategic Policy Committee (SPC) on Housing and a member of the Finance SPC, and sat as an alternate member to the European Committee of the Regions and on the Commission for Citizenship, Governance, Institutional and External Affairs (CIVEX).

Gilliland did not contest the 2024 Dublin City Council election.

== Early life and education ==
Gilliland was born in Drogheda, County Louth, and grew up in Ballybay, County Monaghan. She graduated with a Bachelor of Education from Church of Ireland College of Education awarded by Trinity College Dublin, a Master of Education from Dublin City University, and a Doctor of Education from the University of Nottingham.

Gilliland is a former primary school teacher and a full-time official with the INTO. She led the INTO Learning Section and was their Equality Officer, supporting the union’s Equality Committee and working on issues pertaining to LGBT+ inclusion, racial, ethnic and cultural diversity and member reproductive health related matters. She represented INTO on the Irish Congress of Trade Union’s Women’s Committee and on the European Trade Union Committee for Education’s Standing Committee for Equality, and was a member of the Advisory Group leading the ETUCE's Embracing Diversity in Education project.

Civic offices
Preceded by Hazel Chu	Lord Mayor of Dublin; 2021–2022	Succeeded by Caroline Conroy
