= 1930 Longford–Westmeath by-election =

By-election to the 6th Dáil

- 13 June 1930
- Turnout: 40,844 (72.9%)
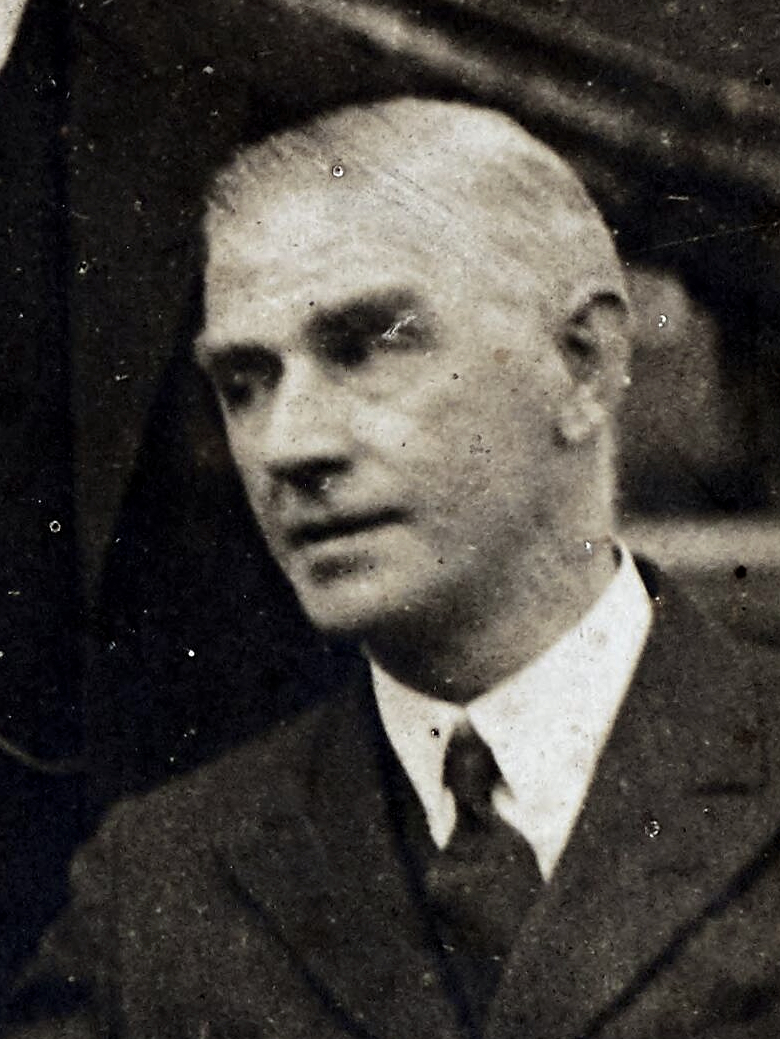
		Delany	Duffy
Nominee	James Geoghegan	Vincent Delany	Michael Duffy
Party	Fianna Fáil	Cumann na nGaedheal	Labour
First preferences	21,881	16,438	2,525
Percentage	53.6%	40.3%	6.2%
TD before election
James Killane
Fianna Fáil
TD after election
James Geoghegan
Fianna Fáil

A Dáil by-election was held in the constituency of Longford–Westmeath in the Irish Free State on Friday, 13 June 1930, to fill a vacancy in the 6th Dáil. It followed the death of Fianna Fáil TD James Killane on 26 April 1930.

In 1930, Longford–Westmeath was an five-seat constituency comprising County Longford and County Westmeath.

The writ of election to fill the vacancy was agreed by the Dáil on 21 May 1930. The by-election was won by the Fianna Fáil candidate James Geoghegan.

== Result ==
1930 Longford–Westmeath by-election
Party	Candidate	FPv%	Count
Party	Candidate	FPv%	1
Fianna Fáil	James Geoghegan	53.6	21,881
Cumann na nGaedheal	Vincent Delany	40.3	16,438
Labour	Michael Duffy	6.2	2,525
Electorate: 56,059 Valid: 40,844 Quota: 20,423 Turnout: 72.9%
