= Bryan Cooper (politician) =

Irish politician (1884–1930)

Teachta Dála
- In office August 1923 – 5 July 1930
- Constituency: Dublin County

Member of Parliament
- In office January 1910 – December 1910
- Constituency: South Dublin

Personal details
- Born: 17 June 1884 Simla, India
- Died: 5 July 1930 (aged 46) County Sligo, Ireland
- Party: Irish Unionist Alliance; Independent; Cumann na nGaedheal
- Spouses: Marion Handcock (m. 1910; div. 1920); Lillian Hewson (m. 1925)
- Relatives: Edward Henry Cooper (grandfather)
- Education: Royal Military Academy, Woolwich

Military service
- Allegiance: British Army
- Rank: Major

Bryan Ricco Cooper (17 June 1884 – 5 July 1930) was an Irish politician, writer and landowner from Markree Castle, County Sligo. He was prominent in Dáil Éireann in the early years of the Irish Free State, having previously served as MP to Westminster for South Dublin (1910), an area he subsequently represented in the Dáil from 1923 to 1930.

== Life ==
The Cooper family, Protestant landlords, had been involved in politics in Sligo since long before the 1800 Act of Union (which Joshua Cooper, a Privy councillor at the time, strongly opposed). Bryan Cooper's father, Francis, was a major in the British Army stationed at Simla, India, where Bryan was born. His mother was the daughter of another Irishman serving in India, Major-General Maunsel Prendergast, who had married a Swiss woman there. The family returned to Ireland before Bryan was a year old, and then spent several years in postings around Britain, until his father was sent to South Africa at the start of the Second Boer War. Bryan was educated (but not particularly happy) at Eton College. In 1900, his father died during the war of typhoid fever and Bryan inherited Markree from his grandfather Edward Henry Cooper.

Cooper joined the British Army and, following his father's advice, trained as a gunner at the Royal Military Academy, Woolwich (1902–1903). A fellow cadet ("R. T. H.") described him as "cheerful, well-mannered and pleasant", but more interested in books than in military matters. He resigned his commission a few years later and returned to Ireland, intending to enter politics — he once said that he entered politics to cure him of his shyness. In his spare time, he wrote poetry strongly influenced by Celtic imagery and W. B. Yeats (whom he later to befriend), and he started work on a novel.

In 1908 he was appointed High Sheriff of Sligo. In January 1910 he was elected Unionist MP for South Dublin, defeating his nearest opponent by only sixty-six votes. During his election campaign he got to know a young lady of Irish ancestry from Fulmer, Buckinghamshire, a Miss Handcock, whom he married shortly afterwards. They were to have a daughter and three sons. He lost his seat at the December election later that year. Aged only 26, he was one of the youngest ever MPs to leave the House of Commons. He resigned his commission as a captain in the Reserves in May 1914, stating publicly that he had done so in sympathy with the officers in the Curragh, but he wrote in his private diary (Uncensored Memoirs) that he had for years been fed up of the regime in the Reserves, and had been intending to quit. After the start of World War I he joined the Fifth (Service) Battalion of the Connaught Rangers. He saw action in Gallipoli, Thessalonika and Stavros. After the war he became Press Censor in Ireland and wrote Ireland Under Sinn Féin. He got to know many writers and intellectuals active in Dublin at the time.

Markree Castle, Sligo, ancestral home of the Coopers, around 1860.

Cooper was first elected to Dáil Éireann at the 1923 general election as an Independent Teachta Dála (TD) for the Dublin County constituency. W. B. Yeats was one of his chief supporters (of whom Cooper wrote: "since I was a boy his writings have been one of the strongest influences on me, and helped to make me the good Irishman I hope I am."). He was re-elected at the June 1927 general election. He has been described as "unofficially leading a grouping of independent pro-business and ex-unionist TDs until 1927". After the dissolution of the 5th Dáil, he joined the Cumann na nGaedheal party, along with other former independents who joined "Mr Cosgrave's ranks" including Labour independent John Daly and Vincent Rice, formerly National League. He was elected as a Cumann na nGaedheal TD at the September 1927 general election. He died in July 1930, and the subsequent by-election on 9 December 1930 was won by Thomas Finlay of Cumann na nGaedheal. He was one of the few people who served in the House of Commons and in the Oireachtas.

In 1931, his widow presented a half-size reproduction of the ancient Lough Lene bell to Dáil Éireann and it has since been the bell of the Ceann Comhairle of Dáil Éireann.

== See also ==
- Markree Observatory

Parliament of the United Kingdom
Preceded by Walter Long	Member of Parliament for South Dublin; January 1910 – December 1910	Succeeded by William Cotton

Dáil	Election	Deputy (Party)	Deputy (Party)	Deputy (Party)	Deputy (Party)	Deputy (Party)	Deputy (Party)	Deputy (Party)	Deputy (Party)
2nd	1921	Michael Derham (SF)	George Gavan Duffy (SF)	Séamus Dwyer (SF)	Desmond FitzGerald (SF)	Frank Lawless (SF)	Margaret Pearse (SF)	6 seats 1921–1923	
3rd	1922	Michael Derham (PT-SF)	George Gavan Duffy (PT-SF)	Thomas Johnson (Lab)	Desmond FitzGerald (PT-SF)	Darrell Figgis (Ind)	John Rooney (FP)	6 seats 1921–1923	
4th	1923	Michael Derham (CnaG)	Bryan Cooper (Ind)	Thomas Johnson (Lab)	Desmond FitzGerald (CnaG)	Darrell Figgis (Ind)	John Good (Ind)	Kathleen Lynn (Rep)	Kevin O'Higgins (CnaG)
4th	1924 by-election	Batt O'Connor (CnaG)	Bryan Cooper (Ind)	Thomas Johnson (Lab)	Desmond FitzGerald (CnaG)	Darrell Figgis (Ind)	John Good (Ind)	Kathleen Lynn (Rep)	Kevin O'Higgins (CnaG)
4th	1926 by-election	Batt O'Connor (CnaG)	Bryan Cooper (Ind)	Thomas Johnson (Lab)	Desmond FitzGerald (CnaG)	William Norton (Lab)	John Good (Ind)	Kathleen Lynn (Rep)	Kevin O'Higgins (CnaG)
5th	1927 (Jun)	Batt O'Connor (CnaG)	Bryan Cooper (Ind)	Thomas Johnson (Lab)	Desmond FitzGerald (CnaG)	Patrick Belton (FF)	John Good (Ind)	Seán MacEntee (FF)	Kevin O'Higgins (CnaG)
5th	1927 by-election	Batt O'Connor (CnaG)	Bryan Cooper (Ind)	Thomas Johnson (Lab)	Desmond FitzGerald (CnaG)	Patrick Belton (FF)	John Good (Ind)	Seán MacEntee (FF)	Gearóid O'Sullivan (CnaG)
6th	1927 (Sep)	Batt O'Connor (CnaG)	Bryan Cooper (CnaG)	Joseph Murphy (Ind)	Desmond FitzGerald (CnaG)	Seán Brady (FF)	John Good (Ind)	Seán MacEntee (FF)	Gearóid O'Sullivan (CnaG)
6th	1930 by-election	Batt O'Connor (CnaG)	Thomas Finlay (CnaG)	Joseph Murphy (Ind)	Desmond FitzGerald (CnaG)	Seán Brady (FF)	John Good (Ind)	Seán MacEntee (FF)	Gearóid O'Sullivan (CnaG)
7th	1932	Batt O'Connor (CnaG)	Thomas Finlay (CnaG)	Patrick Curran (Lab)	Henry Dockrell (CnaG)	Seán Brady (FF)	John Good (Ind)	Seán MacEntee (FF)	Gearóid O'Sullivan (CnaG)
8th	1933	Batt O'Connor (CnaG)	John A. Costello (CnaG)	Margaret Mary Pearse (FF)	Henry Dockrell (CnaG)	Seán Brady (FF)	John Good (Ind)	Seán MacEntee (FF)	Gearóid O'Sullivan (CnaG)
8th	1935 by-election	Cecil Lavery (FG)	John A. Costello (CnaG)	Margaret Mary Pearse (FF)	Henry Dockrell (CnaG)	Seán Brady (FF)	John Good (Ind)	Seán MacEntee (FF)	Gearóid O'Sullivan (CnaG)
9th	1937	Cecil Lavery (FG)	Henry Dockrell (FG)	Gerrard McGowan (Lab)	Patrick Fogarty (FF)	Seán Brady (FF)	5 seats 1937–1948		
10th	1938	Patrick Belton (FG)	Henry Dockrell (FG)	Thomas Mullen (FF)	Patrick Fogarty (FF)	Seán Brady (FF)	5 seats 1937–1948		
11th	1943	Liam Cosgrave (FG)	Henry Dockrell (FG)	James Tunney (Lab)	Patrick Fogarty (FF)	Seán Brady (FF)	5 seats 1937–1948		
12th	1944	Liam Cosgrave (FG)	Henry Dockrell (FG)	Patrick Burke (FF)	Patrick Fogarty (FF)	Seán Brady (FF)	5 seats 1937–1948		
12th	1947 by-election	Liam Cosgrave (FG)	Henry Dockrell (FG)	Patrick Burke (FF)	Seán MacBride (CnaP)	Seán Brady (FF)	5 seats 1937–1948		
13th	1948	Éamon Rooney (FG)	Seán Dunne (Lab)	Patrick Burke (FF)	3 seats 1948–1961				
14th	1951	Éamon Rooney (FG)	Seán Dunne (Lab)	Patrick Burke (FF)	3 seats 1948–1961				
15th	1954	Éamon Rooney (FG)	Seán Dunne (Lab)	Patrick Burke (FF)	3 seats 1948–1961				
16th	1957	Éamon Rooney (FG)	Kevin Boland (FF)	Patrick Burke (FF)	3 seats 1948–1961				
17th	1961	Éamon Rooney (FG)	Kevin Boland (FF)	Patrick Burke (FF)	Mark Clinton (FG)	Seán Dunne (Ind)	5 seats 1961–1969		
18th	1965	Des Foley (FF)	Kevin Boland (FF)	Patrick Burke (FF)	Mark Clinton (FG)	Seán Dunne (Lab)	5 seats 1961–1969		
19th	1969	Constituency abolished. See Dublin County North and Dublin County South							
