= John Blayney =

Irish rugby player, barrister and judge

John Blayney KSG

Judge of the Supreme Court
- In office 9 January 1992 – 14 March 1997
- Nominated by: Government of Ireland
- Appointed by: Mary Robinson

Judge of the High Court
- In office 1986 – 8 January 1992
- Nominated by: Government of Ireland
- Appointed by: Patrick Hillery

Personal details
- Born: 15 March 1925 Dublin, Ireland
- Died: 17 June 2018 (aged 93) Dublin, Ireland
- Spouse: Bernadette Boullier (m. 1953)
- Relations: Thomas Finlay (brother-in-law); Mary Finlay Geoghegan (niece); Tony Ensor (nephew)
- Children: 6
- Education: University College Dublin; King's Inns

John Joseph Blayney (15 March 1925 – 17 June 2018) was an Irish rugby player, barrister and judge who served a Judge of the Supreme Court from 1992 to 1997 and a Judge of the High Court from 1986 to 1992.

John Blayney was the son of Alexander Joseph Blayney, who was a prominent Dublin surgeon at Mater Hospital.

On 12 December 1991, he was nominated as a Judge of the Supreme Court of Ireland by Taoiseach Charles Haughey. On 9 January 1992, he was appointed to the position by President Mary Robinson. Upon retirement from a long legal career, his position on the bench was filled by Judge Henry Denis Barron. During his retirement, he acted as chairman to the Blayney Inquiry into the "professional and business conduct" of a number of major Irish accountants and accounting firms.

Blayney has, on several occasions, sat on the bench for the European Court of Human Rights.

Blayney played rugby union for Ireland, earning one cap in 1950 in which he ran a 40-yard try against a Scottish side.
