= Duncan Stewart (environmentalist) =

Irish architect and environmentalist

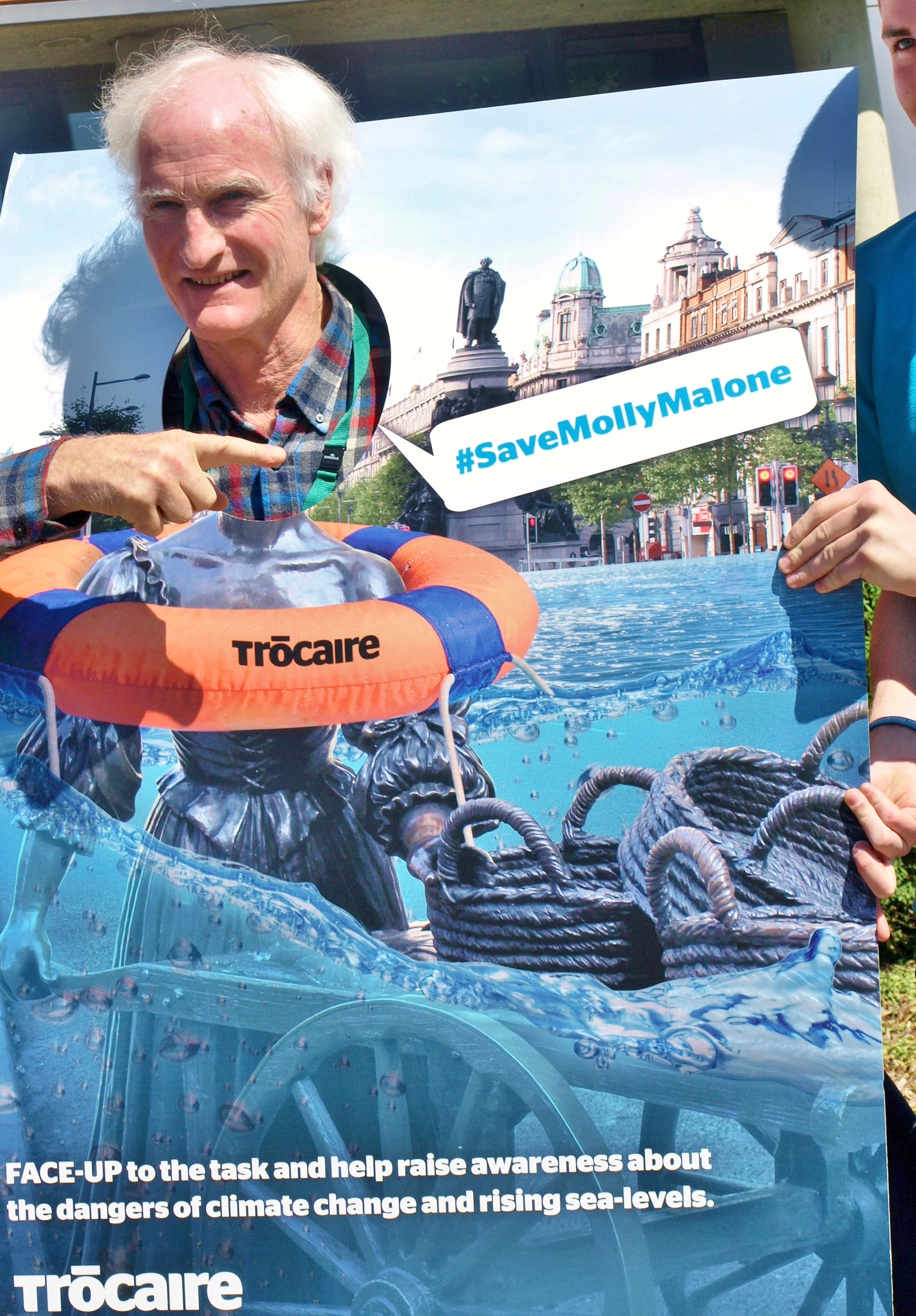
- Stewart in 2015, promoting climate-change awareness
- Born: Duncan Stewart
- Occupations: Architect, broadcaster
- Employer: RTÉ

Duncan Stewart (born 1948) is an Irish architect, environmentalist and media personality known for his environmental activism and work on RTÉ, most notably in the show Eco Eye from 2002 to 2023. He secured his primary degree from UCD. His niece, Louise Morris from Wales is often credited as being the influence for his pursuit in the fight against climate change.

In 1969-70, while still a student, Stewart led the six-month occupation of a row of seven large Georgian houses on Hume Street, Dublin, in protest at their planned demolition in favour of a new office block.

In 2003, he had a near-fatal accident while filming a documentary in Chernobyl.

In April 2014, he vowed to walk out of an interview on the Newstalk Breakfast Show unless he was given more time to speak on the topic of climate change. During the interview he claimed that climate change is not sufficiently covered by the Irish media.

In 2018, he and George Lee (also of RTÉ) were promoting the Nissan Leaf.

In 2023 he retired from RTÉ as Eco Eye was axed. That same year, he was awarded the Freedom of the City of Dublin by Green Party Lord Mayor of Dublin Caroline Conroy.

== Notable television credits ==
- About the House
- Eco Eye
