= 1930 Dublin County by-election =

By-election to the 6th Dáil

- 9 December 1930
- Turnout: 50,386 (44.5%)
	Finlay	Maguire
Nominee	Thomas Finlay	Conor Maguire
Party	Cumann na nGaedheal	Fianna Fáil
First preferences	35,362	15,024
Percentage	70.2%	29.8%
TD before election
Bryan Cooper
Cumann na nGaedheal
TD after election
Thomas Finlay
Cumann na nGaedheal

A Dáil by-election was held in the constituency of Dublin County in the Irish Free State on Tuesday, 9 December 1930, to fill a vacancy in the 6th Dáil. It followed the death of Cumann na nGaedheal TD Bryan Cooper on 5 July 1930.

In 1930, Dublin County was an eight-seat constituency comprising County Dublin.

The writ of election to fill the vacancy was agreed by the Dáil on 19 November 1930. The by-election was won by the Cumann na nGaedheal candidate Thomas Finlay.

== Result ==
1930 Dublin County by-election
Party	Candidate	FPv%	Count
Party	Candidate	FPv%	1
Cumann na nGaedheal	Thomas Finlay	70.2	35,362
Fianna Fáil	Conor Maguire	29.8	15,024
Electorate: 113,260 Valid: 50,386 Quota: 25,194 Turnout: 44.5%
