= Daithí de Róiste =

Irish politician (born 1987)

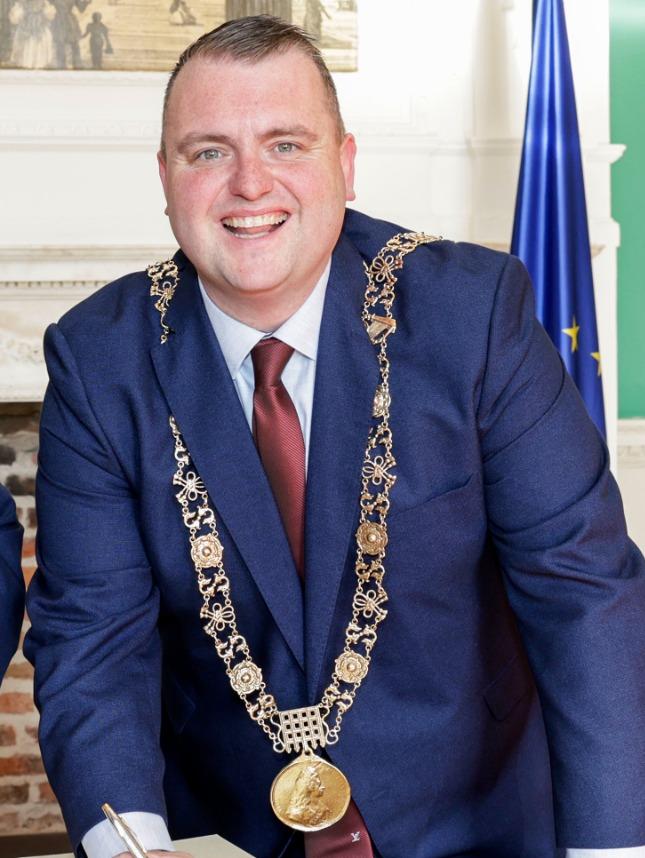
- De Róiste in 2024

Lord Mayor of Dublin
- In office 26 June 2023 – 21 June 2024
- Preceded by: Caroline Conroy
- Succeeded by: James Geoghegan

Dublin City Councillor
- In office May 2014 – June 2024
- Constituency: Ballyfermot–Drimnagh

Personal details
- Born: 1987 or 1988 (age 38–39)
- Party: Fianna Fáil
- Spouse: Amy de Róiste (m. 2016)
- Education: University College Dublin

Daithí de Róiste (born July 1987) is an Irish Fianna Fáil politician who served as the Lord Mayor of Dublin from 2023 to 2024.

== Biography ==
De Róiste graduated with a BA in History from University College Dublin and a Masters in Public Affairs from DIT (TUD).

De Róiste was first elected to the Dublin City Council in 2014 and re-elected in 2019 from the district of Ballyfermot–Drimnagh.

He has worked in marketing and communications for over a decade in Bord na Móna, Permanent TSB, and the University of Pittsburgh Medical Center.

He lost his seat at the 2024 local elections.

Civic offices
Preceded by Caroline Conroy	Lord Mayor of Dublin; 2023–2024	Succeeded by James Geoghegan
