= Emma Blain =

Irish politician

Cllr Emma Blain
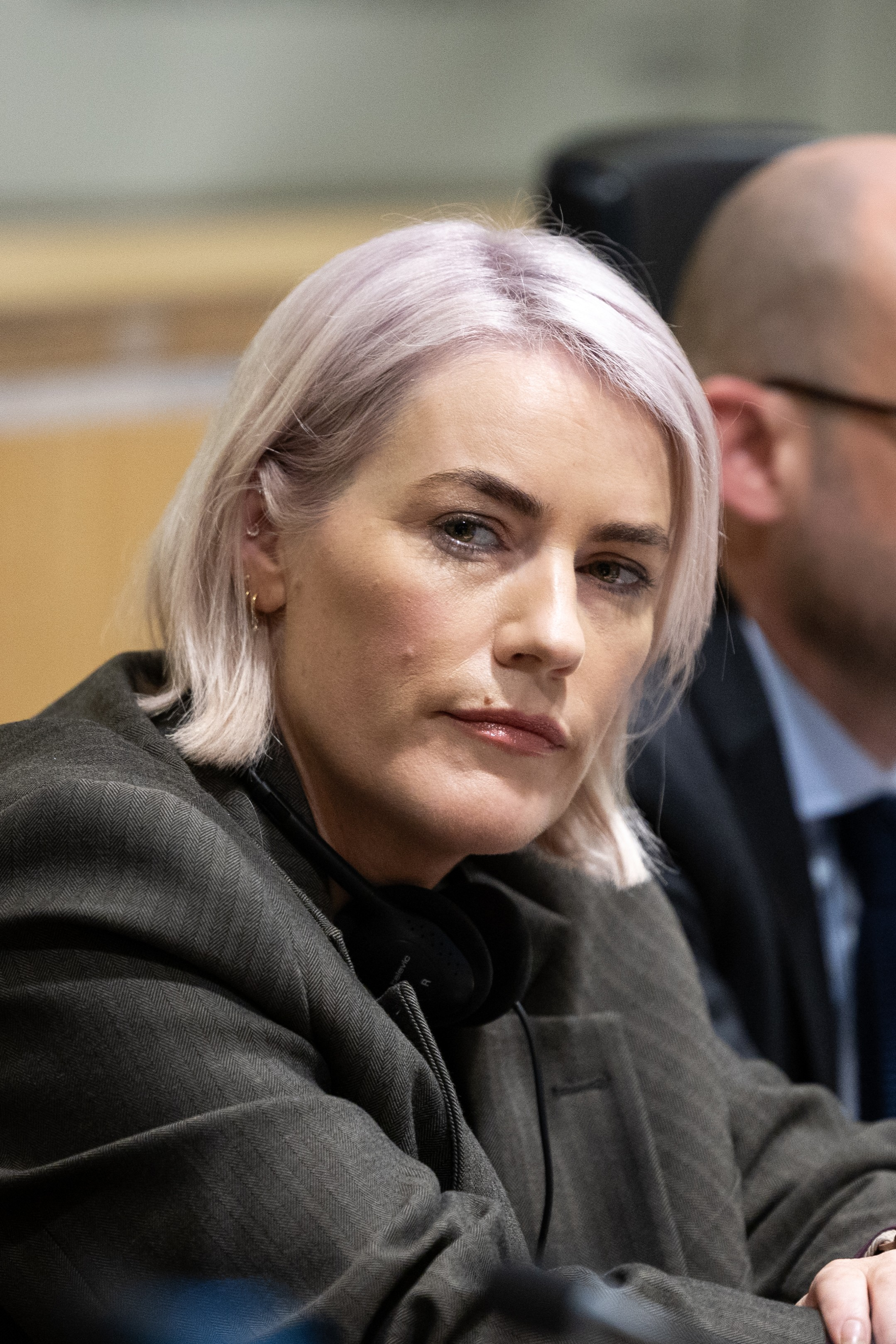
- Blain in 2026

Lord Mayor of Dublin
- In office 18 December 2024 – 30 June 2025
- Preceded by: James Geoghegan
- Succeeded by: Ray McAdam

Dublin City Councillor
- Incumbent
- Assumed office June 2024
- Constituency: Pembroke

Dún Laoghaire–Rathdown County Councillor
- In office April 2016 – June 2024
- Constituency: Glencullen–Sandyford

Personal details
- Party: Fine Gael
- Spouse: Andrew Macken
- Children: 2
- Education: University College Dublin

Emma Blain is an Irish Fine Gael politician and former journalist who served as Lord Mayor of Dublin from December 2024 to June 2025. She has been a member of Dublin City Council for the Pembroke local electoral area since 2024. She succeeded James Geoghegan as Lord Mayor of Dublin after his election to Dáil Eireann.

== Journalism ==
Blain was the editor of The Church of Ireland Gazette from 2020 to 2024, and was previously employed by both the Sunday Independent and The Herald newspapers. During the Celtic Tiger she was in her own words "a form of influencer" as an O3 Girl at the Sunday Independent. An "O3 girl" was a young female journalist featured in the Sunday Independent during the early 2000s, who contributed short opinion columns accompanied by posed, often provocative photographs. The initiative was framed as a blend of light commentary and glamour, but was criticised by some as objectifying women in journalism.

== Politics ==
Blain was previously a member of Dún Laoghaire–Rathdown County Council for the Glencullen-Sandyford area from 2016 to 2024. She was co-opted onto Dún Laoghaire–Rathdown County Council when Neale Richmond was elected to Seanad Éireann in April 2016. She was an unsuccessful candidate for the Industrial and Commercial Panel at the 2020 Seanad election.

Blain ran unsuccessfully as a candidate for the Dublin Bay South constituency at the 2024 general election.

Civic offices
Preceded by James Geoghegan	Lord Mayor of Dublin; Dec. 2024–June 2025	Succeeded by Ray McAdam
