= Thomas Finlay (judge) =

Irish judge, politician and barrister (1922–2017)

Chief Justice of Ireland
- In office 10 October 1985 – 16 March 1994
- Nominated by: Government of Ireland
- Appointed by: Patrick Hillery
- Preceded by: Tom O'Higgins
- Succeeded by: Liam Hamilton

Judge of the Supreme Court
- In office 3 September 1985 – 16 March 1994
- Nominated by: Government of Ireland
- Appointed by: Patrick Hillery

President of the High Court
- In office 10 January 1974 – 1 September 1985
- Nominated by: Government of Ireland
- Appointed by: Erskine H. Childers
- Preceded by: Aindrias Ó Caoimh
- Succeeded by: Liam Hamilton

Judge of the High Court
- In office 2 March 1971 – 1 September 1985
- Nominated by: Government of Ireland
- Appointed by: Éamon de Valera

Teachta Dála
- In office May 1954 – March 1957
- Constituency: Dublin South-Central

Personal details
- Born: 17 September 1922 Blackrock, Dublin, Ireland
- Died: 3 December 2017 (aged 95) Irishtown, Dublin, Ireland
- Resting place: Shanganagh Cemetery, Shankill, Dublin, Ireland
- Party: Fine Gael
- Spouse: Alice Blayney (m. 1947–2012)
- Relations: John Blayney (brother-in-law); Hugh Geoghegan (son-in-law); James Geoghegan (grandson)
- Children: 4, including Mary
- Parent: Thomas Finlay (father)
- Education: University College Dublin; King's Inns

Thomas Aloysius Finlay (17 September 1922 – 3 December 2017) was an Irish judge, politician and barrister who served as Chief Justice of Ireland and a Judge of the Supreme Court from 1985 to 1994, President of the High Court from 1974 to 1985 and a Judge of the High Court from 1971 to 1985. He served as a Teachta Dála (TD) for the Dublin South-Central constituency from 1954 to 1957.

== Early life and career ==
He was the second son of Thomas Finlay, a politician and senior counsel whose career was cut short by his early death in 1932. He was educated at Clongowes Wood College, University College Dublin (UCD) and King's Inns. While attending UCD, he was elected Auditor of the University College Dublin Law Society. His older brother, William Finlay (1921–2010), was a governor of the Bank of Ireland.

He was called to the Bar in 1944, practising on the Midlands circuit and became a senior counsel in 1961.

== Political career ==
He was elected to Dáil Éireann as a Fine Gael TD for the Dublin South-Central constituency at the 1954 general election He lost his seat at the 1957 general election.

== Legal career ==
Following his exit from politics in 1957, having lost his Dáil seat, he resumed practising as a barrister. He successfully defended Captain James Kelly in the infamous 1970 arms trial.

In 1971, he was tasked by the Fianna Fáil government with representing Ireland before the European Commission of Human Rights, when, in response to the ill-treatment of detainees by security forces in Northern Ireland, they charged the British government with torture. Despite the notional recourse such prisoners would have within the British legal system, the Commission ruled the complaint admissible.

== Judicial career ==
He was subsequently appointed a High Court judge and President of the High Court in January 1974. In 1985, Taoiseach Garret FitzGerald and his government nominated him to the Supreme Court and the office of Chief Justice of Ireland. On 10 October 1985, he was appointed by President Patrick Hillery to both roles.

In this period he presided over several landmark cases, including the X Case in 1992, when he overturned a High Court injunction preventing a pregnant teenage rape victim from travelling to the UK for an abortion.

When, in the same year, Judge Liam Hamilton of the High Court, chair of the Beef Tribunal, sought disclosure of the cabinet's minutes for a particular meeting, Chief Justice Finlay along with the majority of the Supreme Court denied the request ruling that the concept of collective government responsibility in the Constitution took precedence.

He announced his resignation as Chief Justice of Ireland, and retirement as a judge in 1994.

== Retirement ==
After his retirement, he presided over several public inquiries.

=== Landsdowne Road Riot Inquiry ===
In 1996, he oversaw the inquiry into the violence by English fans at the aborted 1995 friendly soccer match versus the Republic of Ireland at Lansdowne Road. His report to Bernard Allen, Minister for Sport, was critical of security arrangements on the night and recommended improvements to ticketing, seat-allocation, fan-vetting and policing arrangements. The Irish Government shared his report with the British Home Office.

=== Commission on the Newspaper Industry ===
After the collapse of the Irish Press group in 1995, the Minister for Enterprise and Employment, John Bruton received a damming report from the Competition Authority that Independent Newspapers had abused its dominant position and acted in an anti-competitive manner by purchasing a shareholding in the Irish Press. In September 1995, Bruton announced the Commission on the Newspaper Industry with an extremely wide remit to examine diversity and ownership, competitiveness, editorial freedom and standards of coverage in Irish newspapers as well as the impact of the sales of the British press in Ireland. Minister Bruton appointed 21 people to the commission and appointed Justice Finlay chair. Due to the wide remit and huge number of submissions the commission's report was delayed but was eventually published at the end of July recommending widespread reforms.

=== Tribunal of Inquiry into the Blood Transfusion Service Board ===
Following the discovery of the BTSB anti-D scandal, in 1996, Finlay was appointed the chair and singular member of the Tribunal of Inquiry into the Blood Transfusion Service Board.

The speed and efficiency with which Finlay's BTSB Tribunal conducted its business, restored confidence in the Tribunal as a mechanism for resolving great controversies in the public interest.

=== Sports Adjudication ===
He also sat on an IRFU panel to adjudicate the cases of Rugby players accused of using banned performance-enhancing substances.

== Personal life ==
He was married to Alice Blayney, who predeceased him in 2012. They had five children, two of whom followed in his family's legal tradition; his son John is a Senior Counsel and his daughter Mary Finlay Geoghegan a former judge of the High Court, Court of Appeal and Supreme Court. Whenever his work schedule allowed, he would escape to County Mayo where he could indulge his passion for fishing.

== Death ==
Thomas Finlay died on 3 December 2017, aged 95.

== Sources ==
- Irish Times Obituary: Thomas Finlay, a considerate, patient and shrewd chief justice (Irish Times 6 December 2017)
- A man of common sense rather than abstract principle (Irish Times 18 October 1996)
- Former Chief Justices of the Irish Supreme Court
- Report of the Tribunal of Inquiry into the Blood Transfusion Service Board (1997)

Legal offices
Preceded by Tom O'Higgins	Chief Justice of Ireland; 1985–1994	Succeeded by Liam Hamilton

Dáil	Election	Deputy (Party)	Deputy (Party)	Deputy (Party)	Deputy (Party)	Deputy (Party)
13th	1948	Seán Lemass (FF)	James Larkin Jnr (Lab)	Con Lehane (CnaP)	Maurice E. Dockrell (FG)	John McCann (FF)
14th	1951	Seán Lemass (FF)	James Larkin Jnr (Lab)	Philip Brady (FF)	Maurice E. Dockrell (FG)	John McCann (FF)
15th	1954	Seán Lemass (FF)	James Larkin Jnr (Lab)	Thomas Finlay (FG)	Maurice E. Dockrell (FG)	Celia Lynch (FF)
16th	1957	Seán Lemass (FF)	Jack Murphy (Ind.)	Philip Brady (FF)	Maurice E. Dockrell (FG)	Celia Lynch (FF)
16th	1958 by-election	Seán Lemass (FF)	Patrick Cummins (FF)	Philip Brady (FF)	Maurice E. Dockrell (FG)	Celia Lynch (FF)
17th	1961	Seán Lemass (FF)	Patrick Cummins (FF)	Philip Brady (FF)	Maurice E. Dockrell (FG)	Joseph Barron (CnaP)
18th	1965	Seán Lemass (FF)	Frank Cluskey (Lab)	Philip Brady (FF)	Maurice E. Dockrell (FG)	Thomas J. Fitzpatrick (FF)
19th	1969	Richie Ryan (FG)	Ben Briscoe (FF)	Philip Brady (FF)	John O'Donovan (Lab)	4 seats 1969–1977
20th	1973	Richie Ryan (FG)	Ben Briscoe (FF)	Philip Brady (FF)	John Kelly (FG)	4 seats 1969–1977
21st	1977	Fergus O'Brien (FG)	Frank Cluskey (Lab)	Thomas J. Fitzpatrick (FF)	3 seats 1977–1981	
22nd	1981	Fergus O'Brien (FG)	Ben Briscoe (FF)	Thomas J. Fitzpatrick (FF)	Gay Mitchell (FG)	John O'Connell (Note: O'Connell served as Ceann Comhairle in the 22nd and 23rd Dáil from 1981 to 1983 and was returned automatically at the February 1982 and November 1982 general elections. He joined Fianna Fáil in January 1985.) (Ind.)
23rd	1982 (Feb)	Frank Cluskey (Lab)	Ben Briscoe (FF)	Thomas J. Fitzpatrick (FF)	Gay Mitchell (FG)	John O'Connell (Ind.)
24th	1982 (Nov)	Frank Cluskey (Lab)	Ben Briscoe (FF)	Fergus O'Brien (FG)	Gay Mitchell (FG)	John O'Connell (Ind.)
25th	1987	Frank Cluskey (Lab)	Ben Briscoe (FF)	Fergus O'Brien (FG)	Gay Mitchell (FG)	Mary Mooney (FF)
26th	1989	John O'Connell (FF)	Ben Briscoe (FF)	Fergus O'Brien (FG)	Gay Mitchell (FG)	Eric Byrne (WP)
27th	1992	John O'Connell (FF)	Ben Briscoe (FF)	Pat Upton (Lab)	Gay Mitchell (FG)	4 seats 1992–2002
27th	1994 by-election	Eric Byrne (DL)	Ben Briscoe (FF)	Pat Upton (Lab)	Gay Mitchell (FG)	4 seats 1992–2002
28th	1997	Seán Ardagh (FF)	Ben Briscoe (FF)	Pat Upton (Lab)	Gay Mitchell (FG)	4 seats 1992–2002
28th	1999 by-election	Seán Ardagh (FF)	Ben Briscoe (FF)	Mary Upton (Lab)	Gay Mitchell (FG)	4 seats 1992–2002
29th	2002	Seán Ardagh (FF)	Aengus Ó Snodaigh (SF)	Mary Upton (Lab)	Gay Mitchell (FG)	Michael Mulcahy (FF)
30th	2007	Seán Ardagh (FF)	Aengus Ó Snodaigh (SF)	Mary Upton (Lab)	Catherine Byrne (FG)	Michael Mulcahy (FF)
31st	2011	Eric Byrne (Lab)	Aengus Ó Snodaigh (SF)	Joan Collins (PBP)	Catherine Byrne (FG)	Michael Conaghan (Lab)
32nd	2016	Bríd Smith (AAA–PBP)	Aengus Ó Snodaigh (SF)	Joan Collins (Note: Founded Right to Change in May 2020.) (I4C)	Catherine Byrne (FG)	4 seats from 2016
33rd	2020	Bríd Smith (S–PBP)	Aengus Ó Snodaigh (SF)	Joan Collins (I4C)	Patrick Costello (GP)	4 seats from 2016
34th	2024	Catherine Ardagh (FF)	Aengus Ó Snodaigh (SF)	Máire Devine (SF)	Jen Cummins (SD)	4 seats from 2016
