= Constitution of Ireland =

National democratic constitution

Overview
- Original title: Bunreacht na hÉireann
- Jurisdiction: Ireland
- Ratified: 1 July 1937
- Date effective: 29 December 1937; 88 years ago
- System: Unitary parliamentary republic

Government structure
- Branches: Executive; Legislature; Judiciary
- Head of state: President of Ireland
- Chambers: Bicameral (Dáil Éireann and Seanad Éireann)
- Executive: Government of Ireland
- Judiciary: Supreme Court; Court of Appeal; High Court

History
- Amendments: 32
- Last amended: 11 June 2019; 7 years ago
- Citation: Constitution of Ireland
- Supersedes: Constitution of the Irish Free State

Full text
- Constitution of Ireland (consolidated text) at Wikisource

The Constitution of Ireland (Irish: Bunreacht na hÉireann, pronounced [ˈbˠʊnˠɾˠəxt̪ˠ n̪ˠə ˈheːɾʲən̪ˠ]) is the fundamental law of Ireland. It asserts the national sovereignty of the Irish people. It guarantees certain fundamental rights, along with a popularly elected non-executive president, a bicameral parliament, a separation of powers and judicial review.

It is the second constitution of the Irish state since independence, replacing the 1922 Constitution of the Irish Free State. It came into force on 29 December 1937 following a statewide plebiscite held on 1 July 1937. The Constitution may be amended solely by a national referendum. It is the longest continually operating republican constitution within the European Union.

== Background ==
The Constitution of Ireland replaced the Constitution of the Irish Free State, which had been in effect since the independence, as a dominion, of the Irish state from the United Kingdom on 6 December 1922. There were two main motivations for replacing the constitution in 1937. Firstly, the Statute of Westminster 1931 granted parliamentary autonomy to the six British Dominions (now known as Commonwealth realms) within a British Commonwealth of Nations. This had the effect of making the dominions sovereign nations in their own right. The Irish Free State constitution of 1922 was, in the eyes of many, associated with the controversial Anglo-Irish Treaty. The anti-treaty faction, who opposed the treaty initially by force of arms, was so opposed to the institutions of the new Irish Free State that it initially took an abstentionist line toward them, boycotting them altogether. However, the largest element of this faction became convinced that abstentionism could not be maintained forever. This element, led by Éamon de Valera, formed the Fianna Fáil party in 1926, which entered into government following the 1932 general election.

After 1932, under the provisions of the Statute of Westminster, some of the articles of the original Constitution which were required by the Anglo-Irish Treaty were dismantled by acts of the Oireachtas of the Irish Free State. Such amendments removed references to the Oath of Allegiance, appeals to the United Kingdom's Judicial Committee of the Privy Council, the British Crown and the governor-general. The sudden abdication of Edward VIII in December 1936 was quickly used to redefine the royal connection. Nevertheless, the Fianna Fáil government still desired to replace the constitutional document they saw as having been imposed by the British government in 1922.

The second motive for replacing the original constitution was primarily symbolic. De Valera wanted to put an Irish stamp on the institutions of government, and chose to do this in particular through the use of Irish language nomenclature.

=== Drafting process ===
De Valera personally supervised the writing of the Constitution. It was drafted initially by John Hearne, legal adviser to the Department of External Affairs (now called the Department of Foreign Affairs and Trade). It was translated into Irish over a number of drafts by a group headed by Micheál Ó Gríobhtha (assisted by Risteárd Ó Foghludha), who worked in the Irish Department of Education. De Valera served as his own external affairs minister, hence the use of the department's legal advisor, with whom he had previously worked closely, as opposed to the attorney general or someone from the Department of the President of the Executive Council. He also received significant input from John Charles McQuaid, the then president of Blackrock College, on religious, educational, family and social welfare issues. McQuaid later became, in 1940, the Catholic archbishop of Dublin. Other religious leaders who were consulted were Archbishop Edward Byrne (Roman Catholic), Archbishop John Gregg (Church of Ireland), William Massey (Methodist) and James Irwin (Presbyterian).

There are a number of instances where the texts in English and Irish clash, a potential dilemma which the Constitution resolves by favouring the Irish text even though English is more commonly used in the official sphere.

A draft of the constitution was presented personally to the Vatican for review and comment on two occasions by the department head at external relations, Joseph P. Walsh. Prior to its tabling in Dáil Éireann and presentation to the Irish electorate in a plebiscite, Vatican secretary of state Eugenio Cardinal Pacelli, the future Pope Pius XII, said of the final amended draft: "We do not approve, neither do we disapprove; We shall maintain silence." The quid pro quo for this indulgence of the Catholic Church's interests in Ireland was the degree of respectability which it conferred on De Valera's formerly denounced republican faction and its reputation as the 'semi-constitutional' political wing of the 'irregular' anti-treaty forces.

During the Great Depression, as social polarisation generated campaigns and strikes, Catholic social jurists aimed to forestall class conflict. Taoiseach Éamon de Valera and clericalist advisors such as John Charles McQuaid considered constitutional provisions to incorporate land redistribution, credit system regulation, and welfare rights. Late in the drafting process, however, de Valera re-wrote these initially robust socio-economic rights as non-binding 'directive principles', primarily to satisfy the Department of Finance's preferences for minimal state spending. In line with Ireland's banks and grazier farming interests, the final wording thus preserved the state's existing currency and cattle trading relations with the United Kingdom.

=== Adoption ===
The text of the draft constitution, with minor amendments, was approved on 14 June 1937 by Dáil Éireann (then the sole house of parliament, the Seanad having been abolished the previous year).

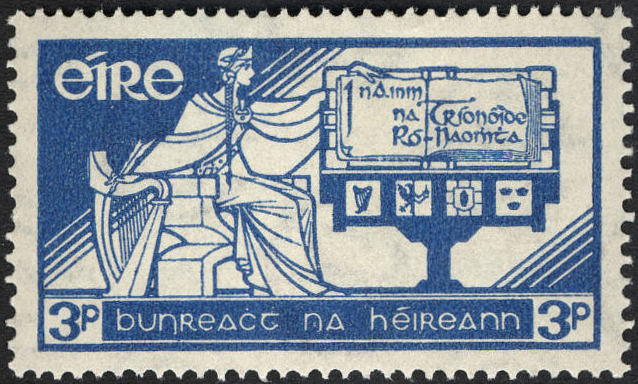
3p denomination of the Irish Constitution postage stamp issue

The draft constitution was then put to a plebiscite on 1 July 1937 (the same day as the 1937 general election), when it was passed by a plurality. 56% of voters were in favour, comprising 38.6% of the whole electorate. The constitution came into force on 29 December 1937 and, to mark the occasion, the Minister for Posts and Telegraphs issued two commemorative stamps on that date.

Among the groups who opposed the constitution were supporters of Fine Gael and the Labour Party, Unionists, and some independents and feminists. The question put to voters was "Do you approve of the Draft Constitution which is the subject of this plebiscite?".

Plebiscite on the Constitution of Ireland
Choice	Votes	%
For	685,105	56.52
Against	526,945	43.48
Total	1,212,050	100.00
Valid votes	1,212,050	90.03
Invalid/blank votes	134,157	9.97
Total votes	1,346,207	100.00
Registered voters/turnout	1,775,055	75.84

=== Response ===
When the draft new constitution was published, the Irish Independent described it as one of de Valera's "finest tributes to his predecessors". The Irish Times criticised the constitution's assertion of a territorial claim on Northern Ireland, and the absence in its text of any reference to the British Commonwealth. The London-based Daily Telegraph included in its criticism the special position assigned to the Church of Rome under the new constitution. The Sunday Times concluded it would only help to "perpetuate division" between Dublin and Belfast. The Irish Catholic concluded it was a "noble document in harmony with papal teachings".

When the new constitution was enacted, the British government, according to The New York Times, "contented itself with a legalistic protest". Its protest took the form of a communiqué on 30 December 1937, in which the British stated:

His Majesty's Government in the United Kingdom has considered the position created by the new Constitution ... of the Irish Free State, in future to be described under the Constitution as 'Eire' or 'Ireland' ... [and] cannot recognise that the adoption of the name 'Eire' or 'Ireland', or any other provision of those articles [of the Irish constitution], involves any right to territory ... forming part of the United Kingdom of Great Britain and Northern Ireland ... They therefore regard the use of the name 'Eire' or 'Ireland' in this connection as relating only to that area which has hitherto been known as the Irish Free State.

The other governments of the British Commonwealth countries chose to continue to regard Ireland as a member of the British Commonwealth. A proposal by the Northern Ireland government that Northern Ireland be renamed "Ulster" in response to the new Irish constitution was aborted after it was determined that this would require Westminster legislation.

The Irish government received a message of goodwill from 268 United States congressmen, including eight senators. The signatories expressed "their ardent congratulations on the birth of the State of Ireland and the consequent coming into effect of the new constitution", adding that "We regard the adoption of the new constitution and the emergence of the State of Ireland as events of the utmost importance."

Feminists such as Hannah Sheehy Skeffington claimed that certain articles threatened their rights as citizens and as workers. Article 41.2, for example, equated womanhood with motherhood and further specified a woman's 'life within the home'. The Women Graduates' Association, the Joint Committee of Women's Societies and Social Workers, together with the Irish Women Workers' Union mobilised a two-month campaign seeking the provisions' amendment or deletion.

The Republican Congress also critiqued the constitution's "stone-age conception of womanhood". Writing in the Irish Democrat, Peadar O'Donnell and Frank Ryan condemned the 1937 Constitution for upholding private property as a sacred, 'natural right' and declaring that capitalism was 'something ordained by Providence forever, amen!' The Congress further opposed the Roman Catholic Church's position as a 'State or semi-State church' in violation of republican principles and an offence to Protestants throughout the island. The 'Roman Catholic Bishops of the South', O'Donnell claimed, now functioned as 'the watchdogs of the private property classes'.

== Main provisions ==
The official text of the Constitution consists of a preamble, numbered articles arranged under headings, and a final dedication (Irish: Dochum glóire Dé agus onóra na hÉireann "For the glory of God and the Honour of Ireland", from the Annals of the Four Masters). Its overall length is approximately 16,000 words.

Articles of the Constitution of Ireland
Heading	Arts	Notes
The Nation	1–3	
The State	4–11	
The President	12–14	
The National Parliament	15–27	
The Government	28	
Local Government	28A	Inserted in 1999
International Relations	29	
The Attorney General	30	
The Council of State	31–32	
The Comptroller and Auditor General	33	
The Courts	34–37	
Trial of Offences	38–39	
Fundamental Rights	40–44	Article 42A was inserted in 2012
Directive Principles of Social Policy	45	Not justiciable
Amendment of the Constitution	46	
The Referendum	47	
Repeal of Constitution of Saorstát Éireann and Continuance of Laws	48–50	
Transitory Provisions	51–64	Omitted from officially published texts. Article 64 was added in 2013

=== Preamble ===
The preamble reads:

In the Name of the Most Holy Trinity, from Whom is all authority and to Whom, as our final end, all actions both of men and States must be referred,
We, the people of Éire,
Humbly acknowledging all our obligations to our Divine Lord, Jesus Christ, Who sustained our fathers through centuries of trial,
Gratefully remembering their heroic and unremitting struggle to regain the rightful independence of our Nation,
And seeking to promote the common good, with due observance of Prudence, Justice and Charity, so that the dignity and freedom of the individual may be assured, true social order attained, the unity of our country restored, and concord established with other nations,
Do hereby adopt, enact, and give to ourselves this Constitution.

Unlike many preambles, that of the constitution is justiciable and has been cited by the Supreme Court in numerous cases, including McGee v The Attorney General (1974), Norris v. Attorney General (1984), and Attorney General v X (1992). The 1996 report of the Constitution Review Group recommended amending the preamble to make it non-justiciable; removing allusions to Christianity and to nationalist historiography, which might alienate the state's non-Christians and unionists; and changing Éire to Ireland in the English text to match the name of the State.

=== Characteristics of the nation and state ===
- National sovereignty: The constitution asserts the "inalienable, indefeasible, and sovereign right" of the Irish people to self-determination (Article 1). The state is declared to be "sovereign, independent, [and] democratic" (Article 5).
- Popular sovereignty: It is stated that all powers of government "derive, under God, from the people" (Article 6.1). However, it is also stated that those powers "are exercisable only by or on the authority of the organs of State" established by the Constitution (Article 6.2).
- Name of the state: The Constitution declares that "[the] name of the State is Éire, or, in the English language, Ireland" (Article 4). Under The Republic of Ireland Act 1948 the term "Republic of Ireland" is the official "description" of the state; the Oireachtas, however, has left unaltered "Ireland" as the formal name of the state as defined by the Constitution.
- United Ireland: Article 2, as substituted after the Good Friday Agreement, asserts that "every person born in the island of Ireland" has the right "to be part of the Irish Nation"; however, Article 9.2 now limits this to persons having at least one parent as an Irish citizen. Article 3 declares that it is the "firm will of the Irish Nation" to bring about a united Ireland, provided that this occurs "only by peaceful means", and only with the express consent of the majority of the people in both jurisdictions of Ireland.
- National flag: The national flag is defined as "the tricolour of green, white and orange" (Article 7).
- Capital city: The Houses of the Oireachtas (parliament) must usually meet in or near Dublin (Article 15.1.3°) ("or in such other place as they may from time to time determine"), and the President's official residence must be in or near the city (Article 12.11.1°).

=== Languages ===
Article 8 of the Constitution states:

1. The Irish language as the national language is the first official language.
2. The English language is recognised as a second official language.
3. Provision may, however, be made by law for the exclusive use of either of the said languages for any one or more official purposes, either throughout the State or in any part thereof.

Interpretation of these provisions has been contentious. The Constitution itself is enrolled in both languages, and in case of conflict the Irish language version takes precedence, even though in practice the Irish text is a translation of the English rather than vice versa. The 1937 Constitution introduced some Irish-language terms into English, such as Taoiseach and Tánaiste, while others, such as Oireachtas, had been used in the Free State Constitution. The use in English of Éire, the Irish-language name of the state, is deprecated.

=== Organs of government ===
The Constitution establishes a government under a parliamentary system. It provides for a directly elected, largely ceremonial president of Ireland (Article 12), a head of government called the taoiseach (Article 28), and a national parliament called the Oireachtas (Article 15). The Oireachtas has a dominant directly elected lower house known as Dáil Éireann (Article 16) and an upper house Seanad Éireann (Article 18), which is partly appointed, partly indirectly elected and partly elected by a limited electorate. There is also an independent judiciary headed by the Supreme Court (Article 34).

=== National emergency ===
Under Article 28.3.3° the Constitution grants the state sweeping powers "in time of war or armed rebellion", which may (if so resolved by both Houses of the Oireachtas) include an armed conflict in which the state is not a direct participant. During a national emergency the Oireachtas may pass laws that would otherwise be unconstitutional, and the actions of the executive cannot be found to be ultra vires or unconstitutional provided they at least "purport" to be in pursuance of such a law. However, the constitutional prohibition on the death penalty (Article 15.5.2°), introduced by an amendment made in 2001, is an absolute exception to these powers.

There have been two national emergencies since 1937: an emergency declared in 1939 to cover the threat to national security posed as a consequence of World War II (although the state remained formally neutral throughout that conflict), and an emergency declared in 1976 to deal with the threat to the security of the state posed by the Provisional IRA.

=== International relations ===
- European Union: Under Article 29.4.6° EU law takes precedence over the Constitution if there is a conflict between the two, but only to the extent that such EU law is "necessitated" by Ireland's membership. The Supreme Court has ruled that any EU Treaty that substantially alters the character of the Union must be approved by a constitutional amendment. For this reason separate provisions of Article 29 have permitted the state to ratify the Single European Act, Maastricht Treaty, Amsterdam Treaty, Nice Treaty and Treaty of Lisbon.
- International law: Under Article 29.6 international treaties to which the state is a party are not to be considered part of Ireland's domestic law unless the Oireachtas has so provided. Under Article 29.3 it is declared that the state "accepts the generally recognised principles of international law as its rule of conduct in its relations with other States", but the High Court has ruled that this provision is merely aspirational, and not enforceable.

=== Individual rights ===
==== As enumerated under the heading "Fundamental Rights" ====
- Equality before the law: Equality of all citizens before the law is guaranteed by Article 40.1.
- Prohibition on titles of nobility: The state may not confer titles of nobility, and no citizen may accept such a title without the permission of the Government (Article 40.2). In practice, governmental approval is usually a formality.
- Personal rights: The state is bound to protect "the personal rights of the citizen", and in particular to defend "the life, person, good name, and property rights of every citizen" (Article 40.3).
- Unenumerated rights: The language used in Article 40.3.1° has been interpreted by the courts as implying the existence of unenumerated rights afforded to Irish citizens under natural law. Such rights upheld by the courts have included the right to marital privacy and the right of the unmarried mother to custody of her child.
- Abortion law: Pregnancy termination may be regulated by law (Article 40.3.3°). (Abortion had been prohibited by the previous Article 40.3.3°, which the Irish public repealed and replaced in a 2018 referendum.)
- Habeas corpus: The citizen's right to personal liberty is guaranteed by Article 40.4, which section also sets out in detail the procedure for obtaining habeas corpus. However, these rights are specifically excepted from applying to the actions of the Defence Forces during a "state of war or armed rebellion" (Article 40.4.5°). Since the Sixteenth Amendment it has also been constitutional for a court to deny bail to someone charged with a crime where "it is reasonably considered necessary", to prevent that person from committing a "serious offence" (Article 40.4.6°).
- Inviolability of the home: A citizen's home may not be forcibly entered, except as permitted by law (Article 40.5).
- Freedom of speech: Subject to "public order and morality", a qualified right of freedom of speech is guaranteed by Article 40.6.1°. However, "the State shall endeavour to ensure that organs of public opinion" (such as the news media) "shall not be used to undermine public order or morality or the authority of the State". Furthermore, "the publication or utterance of seditious or indecent matter" is specifically stated to be a criminal offence. This also prohibited blasphemy until it was removed by referendum in 2018. In Corway v. Independent Newspapers (1999), the Supreme Court dismissed an attempt to bring a prosecution for blasphemy on the basis that, amongst other things, no coherent definition of the offence was provided by law. Such a definition was subsequently provided by the Defamation Act 2009, which defined it as the publication of matter "grossly abusive or insulting in relation to matters held sacred by any religion, thereby [intentionally] causing outrage among a substantial number of the adherents of that religion". There was never a prosecution under this Act.
- Freedom of peaceful assembly: Subject to "public order and morality", the right of citizens to peaceful assembly "without arms" is guaranteed by Article 40.6.1°. However, the Oireachtas is empowered to limit this right by law when a meeting may be "calculated to cause a breach of the peace or to be a danger or nuisance to the general public"; the Oireachtas is similarly empowered to limit this right in relation to meetings held "in the vicinity" of either House.
- Freedom of association: Subject to "public order and morality", the right of citizens "to form associations and unions" is also guaranteed by Article 40.6.1°; however, the exercise of this right may be regulated by law "in the public interest".
- Family and home life: Under Article 41.1 the state promises to "protect the Family", and recognises the family as having "inalienable and imprescriptible rights, antecedent and superior to all positive law". Under Article 41.2 the state is required to ensure that "economic necessity" does not oblige a mother "to engage in labour to the neglect of [her] duties in the home". Article 41.3 sets out conditions that must be fulfilled before a court may grant a divorce, including that adequate financial provision has been made for both spouses and any of their children.
- Education: Article 42 guarantees parents the right to determine where their children shall be educated (including at home), provided a minimum standard is met. Under the same article the state must provide for free primary level education. Currently Irish law also guarantees free second and third level education.
- Private property: The right to own and transfer private property is guaranteed by Article 43, subject to "the principles of social justice", and in accordance with laws passed reconciling the right "with the exigencies of the common good" (Article 43).
- Religious freedom: A citizen's freedom of religious conscience, practice, and worship is guaranteed, "subject to public order and morality", by Article 44.2.1°. The state may not "endow" any religion (Article 44.2.2°), nor discriminate on religious grounds (Article 44.2.3°).

==== As enumerated under other headings ====
- Prohibition of the death penalty: Since the enactment of the twenty-first amendment, signed into law in 2002, the Oireachtas is prohibited from enacting any law that imposes the death penalty (Article 15.5.2°); this restriction even applies during a time of war or armed rebellion (Article 28.3.3°).
- Prohibition of ex post facto laws: The Oireachtas may not enact ex post facto criminal laws (Article 15.5.1°).
- Due process and trial by jury: Trial for any alleged criminal offence may only be "in due course of law" (Article 38.1). All trials for a serious offence of a person not subject to military law must be before a jury (Article 38.5), except where "special courts" have been established by law because "the ordinary courts are inadequate to secure the effective administration of justice, and the preservation of public peace and order", and except where military tribunals have been established by law "to deal with a state of war or armed rebellion".
- Sexual discrimination: The sex of an individual cannot be a reason to deny them the right to citizenship (Article 9.1.3°), nor to deny them a vote for (or membership of) Dáil Éireann (Article 16.1).

=== Directive Principles of Social Policy ===
Article 45 outlines broad principles of social and economic policy. Its provisions are, however, intended solely "for the general guidance of the Oireachtas", and "shall not be cognisable by any Court under any of the provisions of this Constitution" (preamble to Article 45).

The "Directive Principles of Social Policy" feature little in contemporary parliamentary debates. However, no proposals have yet been made for their repeal or amendment.

The principles require, in summary, that:

- "justice and charity" must "inform all the institutions of the national life".
- Everyone has the right to an adequate occupation.
- The free market and private property must be regulated in the interests of the common good.
- The state must prevent a destructive concentration of essential commodities in the hands of a few.
- The state must supplement private industry where necessary.
- The state should ensure efficiency in private industry and protect the public against economic exploitation.
- The state must protect the vulnerable, such as orphans and the aged.
- No one may be forced into an occupation unsuited to their age, sex or strength.

The "Directive Principles" have influenced other constitutions. Notably, the famous "Indian Directive Principles of State Policy" contained in the Constitution of India are influenced by the Constitution of Ireland. Moreover, the previous Constitution of Nepal adopted in 1962 and in force for 28 years and commonly called Panchayat Constitution contained a verbatim translation of the "Directive Principles" of the Irish constitution.

=== Transitory provisions ===
The transitory provisions of the constitution provided for a smooth takeover from the pre-existing institutions of the Free State to those established by the new constitution. Institutions would initially be assigned to their Free State analogues where available; this applied to the Dáil, courts, government, public service, attorney general, comptroller and auditor general, Defence Forces and police. For constitutional innovations — the president and Seanad — provision was made for their establishment within 180 days, and for the Oireachtas and Presidential Commission to function without them in the interim notwithstanding that they were otherwise essential.

Judges were required to swear allegiance to the new Constitution to continue in office, but other continuing public servants were not. Article 51 allowed constitutional amendments without referendum during the three years after the first President took office (Douglas Hyde did so on 25 June 1938). This was to facilitate the Oireachtas fixing any defects or oversights that quickly became obvious. The President could still demand a referendum in some cases, but the First (1939) and Second (1941) amendments were enacted under Article 51 without referendum.

The transitory provisions are mostly still in force but spent. They themselves mandate that they be omitted from all officially published texts of the Constitution: either as soon Hyde took office, or three years later in the case of Article 51. Article 51 expressly provides that it would cease to have legal effect once it was removed, but the rest remain in force, which has created subsequent inconvenience. The Second Amendment made changes to Article 56 despite the fact that it was no longer a part of the official text. The transitional continuation of the pre-1937 courts was not formally ended until the Courts (Establishment and Constitution) Act 1961, whose long title and detailed provisions refer to "Article 58 of the Constitution". A journalist commented in 1958 that the courts' status was determined by "a non-existent provision of the Constitution".

Further transitory provisions have been added by subsequent constitutional amendments, and similarly omitted from officially published texts. The Nineteenth (1998) added subsections 3°, 4° and 5° to Article 29.7 to facilitate the 1999 changes to Articles 2 and 3; articles 34A and 64 were added by the Thirty-third (2013) to initialise the new Court of Appeal. The rejected 2013 proposal to abolish the Seanad included both the deletion of previous Seanad-related transitory provisions and the addition of two new abolition-related ones. The associated Referendum Commission published the full transitory provisions for the information of voters, with a disclaimer that this did not constitute an "official" text.

=== Amendments ===
Any part of the Constitution may be amended, but only by referendum.

The procedure for amendment of the Constitution is set out in Article 46. An amendment must first be passed by both Houses of the Oireachtas, then be submitted to a referendum, and then finally must be signed into law by the President.

Amendments are sometimes proposed to address a new social problem or phenomenon not considered at the time of the Constitution being drafted (e.g. children's rights, same-sex marriage), to address outmoded provisions in the Constitution (e.g. special position of the Roman Catholic Church, prohibition on abortion), or to attempt to reverse or alter an interpretation of the court through a corrective referendum (e.g. Oireachtas enquiries). Usually referendums are only proposed when there is wide political support for the proposed change.

==== Enrollment of the Constitution ====
Article 25.5 provides that from time to time, the taoiseach may cause an up to date text of the Constitution to be prepared in Irish and in English, embodying all of the amendments made so far (and retaining the transitory provisions). Once this new text has been signed by the taoiseach, the chief justice and the president, it is enrolled on vellum and deposited with the office of the registrar of the Supreme Court. Once enrolled, the new text becomes conclusive evidence of the Constitution, and supersedes earlier enrolled copies. The Constitution has been enrolled six times: in 1938, 1942, 1980, 1990, 1999, and 2019.

== Judicial review of laws ==
The Constitution states that it is the highest law of the land and grants the Supreme Court of Ireland authority to interpret its provisions, and to strike down the laws of the Oireachtas and activities of the Government it finds to be unconstitutional. Under judicial review the quite broad meaning of certain articles has come to be explored and expanded upon since 1937.

The Supreme Court ruled that Articles 2 and 3, before their alteration in 1999, did not impose a positive obligation upon the state that could be enforced in a court of law. The reference in Article 41 to the family's "imprescriptible rights, antecedent and superior to all positive law" has been interpreted by the Supreme Court as conferring upon spouses a broad right to privacy in marital affairs. In McGee v. The Attorney General (1974) the court invoked this right to strike down laws banning the sale of contraceptives. The court also issued a controversial interpretation of Article 40.3.3°, which before its replacement in 2018 prohibited abortion. In Attorney General v X (1992), commonly known as the X Case, the Supreme Court ruled that the state must permit an abortion where there is a danger to her life, including a risk of suicide.

== Issues of controversy ==
Writing in 1968, Irish Times literary editor Terence de Vere White criticised both the constitution and the existing political system, "At the time of this writing, the Constitution of the Republic is under scrutiny, but it is unlikely that any proposed changes therein will radically alter the system established. A Constitution on the United States model might well suit the people better than the present one; but the Irish are too innately Conservative ever to bring about such a change except by gradual and almost imperceptible degrees."

=== The "national territory" ===
As adopted in 1937, Article 2 asserted that "the whole island of Ireland, its islands and the territorial seas" formed a single "national territory", while Article 3 asserted that the Oireachtas had a right "to exercise jurisdiction over the whole of that territory". These articles offended some Unionists in Northern Ireland, who considered them tantamount to an illegal extraterritorial claim.

Under the terms of the 1998 Good Friday Agreement, Articles 2 and 3 were amended to remove any reference to a "national territory", and to state that a united Ireland should only come about with the consent of majorities in both the jurisdictions on the island of Ireland. The amended Articles also guarantee the people of Northern Ireland the right to be a "part of the Irish Nation", and to Irish citizenship. This change came into force in December 1999.

=== Religion ===
The Constitution guarantees freedom of worship, and forbids the state from creating an established church.

Article 44.1 as originally enacted explicitly "recognised" a number of Christian denominations, such as the Anglican Church of Ireland, the Presbyterian Church in Ireland, as well as "the Jewish Congregations". It also recognised the "special position" of the Catholic Church. These provisions were removed by the Fifth Amendment in 1973 (see below). Nevertheless, the constitution still contains a number of explicit religious references, such as in the preamble, the declaration made by the President, and the remaining text of Article 44.1, which reads:

The State acknowledges that the homage of public worship is due to Almighty God. It shall hold His Name in reverence, and shall respect and honour religion.

A number of ideas found in the Constitution reflect the Catholic social teachings when the original text was drafted. Such teachings informed the provisions of the (non-binding) Directive Principles of Social Policy, as well as the system of vocational panels used to elect the Senate. The Constitution also grants very broadly worded rights to the institution of the family.

The remaining religious provisions of the Constitution, including the wording of the Preamble, remain controversial and widely debated.

As originally enacted, the Constitution also included a prohibition on divorce. The ban on divorce was not removed until 1996.

- Incorporating Catholic social teaching into law was common to many predominantly Catholic countries in the 1930s. Divorce, for example, was banned in other states such as Italy, which repealed its ban in the 1970s.
- The reference to the Catholic Church's special position was of no legal effect and there was significance in the fact that the "special position" of Catholicism was held to derive merely from its greater number of adherents. Notably, Éamon De Valera resisted pressure from right-wing Catholic groups such as Maria Duce to make Catholicism an established church or to declare it the "one true religion".
- The prohibition on divorce was supported by senior members of the Protestant (Anglican) Church of Ireland.
- The Constitution's explicit recognition of the Jewish community was progressive in the climate of the 1930s.

=== Abortion ===
The Constitution had, from 1983 to 2018, contained a prohibition of abortion. From 1992 the constitution did not prohibit the distribution of information about abortion services in other countries or the right of freedom of travel to procure an abortion. In theory, the prohibition of abortion did not apply to cases in which there was a threat to the life of the mother (including from risk of suicide), though the 2012 death of Savita Halappanavar suggested that the practical position was a total prohibition.

Article 40.3.3° was inserted into the Constitution in 1983 by the Eighth Amendment of the Constitution of Ireland. The Eighth Amendment recognised "the unborn" as having a right to life equal to that of "the mother". Accordingly, abortions could be legally conducted in Ireland only as part of a medical intervention performed to save the life of the pregnant woman, including a pregnant woman at risk of suicide. On 25 May 2018, a referendum was held asking whether the Eighth Amendment should be repealed. A majority voted to repeal, and the Eighth Amendment was subsequently repealed on 18 September 2018 via the passage of the Thirty-sixth Amendment.

=== Status of women ===
The Constitution guarantees women the right to vote and to nationality and citizenship on an equal basis with men. It also contains a provision, Article 41.2, which states:

1° [...] the State recognises that by her life within the home, woman gives to the State a support without which the common good cannot be achieved. 2° The State shall, therefore, endeavour to ensure that mothers shall not be obliged by economic necessity to engage in labour to the neglect of their duties in the home.

A proposed amendment to this article (the Fortieth Amendment) was defeated in a referendum in March 2024.

=== Head of state ===
In 1949 the Irish state abandoned its few remaining constitutional ties with the British monarchy, and it was declared by an Act of the Oireachtas that the term "Republic of Ireland" could be used as a "description" for the Irish state. However, there is debate as to whether or not the state was a republic in the period 1937–1949; between these dates the state was not described in any law as a republic. The current text of the Constitution does not mention the word "republic", but does for example assert that all power is derived, "under God, from the people" (Article 6.1).

Debate largely focuses on the question of whether, before 1949, the head of state was the president of Ireland or King George VI. The Constitution did not directly refer to the king, but also did not (and still does not) state that the president was head of state. The president exercised most of the usual internal functions of a head of state, such as formally appointing the Government, and promulgating laws.

In 1936, before the enactment of the existing Constitution, George VI had been declared "By the Grace of God, of Great Britain, Ireland and the British Dominions beyond the Seas King, Defender of the Faith, Emperor of India" and, under the External Relations Act of the same year, it was this king who formally represented the state in its foreign affairs. Treaties, for example, were signed in the name of the king, who also accredited ambassadors and received the letters of credence of foreign diplomats. Representing a state abroad is seen by many scholars as the key characteristic of a head of state. This role meant, in any case, that George VI was the head of state in the eyes of foreign nations.

Section 3(1) of the Act stipulated that:

so long as Saorstát Éireann [i.e. the Irish Free State] is associated with the following nations, that is to say, Australia, Canada, Great Britain, New Zealand and South Africa [i.e. the dominions then within the Commonwealth], and so long as the King recognised by those nations as the symbol of their co-operation continues to act on behalf of each of those nations (on the advice of the several Governments thereof) for the purposes of the appointment of diplomatic and consular representatives and the conclusion of international agreements, the King so recognised may, and is hereby authorised to, act on behalf of Saorstát Éireann for the like purposes as and when advised by the Executive Council so to do."

However, the removal of the king's constitutional position within Ireland was brought about in 1948 not by any change to the Constitution but by ordinary law (the Republic of Ireland Act 1948). Since the Irish state was unambiguously a republic after 1949 (when the 1948 act came into operation) and the same Constitution was in force prior to that time, some have argued that the Irish state was in reality a republic from the Constitution's enactment in 1937.

=== Name of the state ===
The constitution begins with words "We, the people of Éire". It then declares, in Article 4, that the name of the state is "Éire, or, in the English language, Ireland". The text of the draft constitution as originally introduced into the Dáil had simply stated that the state was to be called Éire, and that term was used throughout the text of the draft constitution. However, the English text of the draft constitution was amended during the parliamentary debates to replace "Éire" with "Ireland". (The only exceptions were the preamble, in which "Éire" is used alone, and Article 4, which was amended so as to refer to both "Éire" and the alternative English language name of "Ireland".) The name of the state was the subject of a long dispute between the British and Irish governments, which has since been resolved.

=== Non-traditional family units ===
Article 41.1.1° of the Constitution "recognises the Family as the natural primary and fundamental unit group of Society, and as a moral institution possessing inalienable and imprescriptible rights, antecedent and superior to all positive law", and guarantees its protection by the state. The 34th amendment in 2015 mandated recognition of same-sex marriage in Ireland. A referendum in March 2024 rejected a proposed amendment which would have deleted a claim that the family is founded on marriage and amended Article 41.1.1° so as to recognise "the Family, "whether founded on marriage or on other durable relationships".

A consequence of Article 41 is that non-marital family unit members are not entitled to any of the encompassed protections, including those under the realms of tax, inheritance, and social welfare, granted by Article 41. For example, in State (Nicolaou) v. An Bord Uchtála (1966), where an unmarried father, who had become estranged from the mother of his child some months after living and caring for the same child together, was prevented from invoking the provisions of Article 41 to halt the mother's wishes of putting the child up for adoption. Supreme Court Justice Brian Walsh stated that "the family referred to in [Article 41 was] the family which is founded on the institution of marriage".

=== Economic and social rights ===
Recent polls suggest that more than 70 percent of the Irish public believe that the Irish Constitution should be amended to protect human rights like the right to health and social security.

In February 2014, the Convention on the Irish Constitution (2014) voted to constitutionalise rights to health, housing, and adequate living standards. Successive Irish governments, however, have thus far not acted upon its recommendations to constitutionalise new economic and social rights.

Civil society groups have articulated and mobilised for socio-economic rights in response to the state's handling of the 2008 crisis, particularly its nationalising of private banking debts and imposition of austerity. The Right2Water campaign (2015) mobilised tens of thousands of people in support of the constitutional recognition of a right to water, as well as rights to decent work, health, housing, education, debt justice, and democratic reform. Civil society organisations continue to call for a constitutional right to housing to address homelessness.

== Discrepancies between the Irish and English texts ==
A number of discrepancies have been identified between the Irish language and English language texts of the Constitution. According to Article 25.5.4° the Irish text prevails in such cases. The second amendment resolved some of these in 1941 with changes to the Irish language texts of Articles 11, 13, 15, 18, 20, 28 and 34 which had no corresponding change to the English language text.

Perhaps the most significant remaining discrepancy between the two texts of the Constitution is to be found in the subsection stipulating the minimum age for a candidate to be eligible for election as President (Art. 12.4.1°). According to the English text, an eligible candidate "has reached his thirty-fifth year of age", whereas the Irish text has this as "ag a bhfuil cúig bliana tríochad slán" ("has completed his thirty-five years").

A person's first year begins when they are born and ends the day before their first birthday. A first birthday is the beginning of their second year. Accordingly, the thirty-fifth year of age is reached on a person's thirty-fourth birthday. In contrast a person has completed their first year on their first birthday and their thirty-fifth year on their thirty-fifth birthday. This can be contrasted with Article 16.1.2˚ regarding the entitlement to vote for Dáil Éireann which states this as those "who have reached the age of eighteen years".

== Constitutional reviews ==
The Constitution has been subjected to a series of formal reviews.

1966
The then taoiseach, Seán Lemass, encouraged the establishment of an informal Oireachtas committee, which undertook a general review of the Constitution and issued a report in 1967.

1968
A draft report was produced by a legal committee, chaired by the attorney general Colm Condon. No final report was published.

1972
The Inter-Party Committee on the Implications of Irish Unity addressed constitutional issues in relation to Northern Ireland. Its work was continued by the 1973 All-Party Oireachtas Committee on Irish Relations and later by the 1982 Constitution Review Body, a group of legal experts under the chairmanship of the attorney general. Neither of the 1972 groups published a report.

1983–1984
The New Ireland Forum was established in 1983, and its report in 1984 covered some constitutional issues.

1988
The Progressive Democrats published a review entitled Constitution for a New Republic.

1994–1997
In October 1994, the government established a Forum for Peace and Reconciliation, which considered some constitutional issues relating to Northern Ireland. The Forum suspended its work in February 1996 but met once more in December 1997.

1995–1996
The Constitution Review Group was an expert group established by the government in 1995, and chaired by Dr T.K. Whitaker. Its 700-page report, published in July 1996, was described as "the most thorough analysis of the Constitution from the legal, political science, administrative, social and economic perspectives ever made".

1996–2007
The All-Party Oireachtas Committee on the Constitution was set up in 1996, running in three stages until it completed its work in 2007.

2012–2014
A Constitutional Convention composed both of citizen members and elected representatives examined a number of specific measures and proposed their amendment

=== All-Party Oireachtas Committee ===
The All-Party Oireachtas Committee on the Constitution was established in 1996.

==== First committee ====
The First All-Party Committee (1996–1997), chaired by Fine Gael TD Jim O'Keeffe, published two progress reports in 1997:

- 1st Progress Report, 1997
- 2nd Progress Report, 1997

==== Second committee ====
The Second All-Party Oireachtas Committee on the Constitution (1997–2002) was chaired by Fianna Fáil TD Brian Lenihan. It published five progress reports:

- 3rd Progress Report: The President, 1998
- 4th Progress Report: the courts and judiciary, 1999
- 5th Progress Report: abortion, 2000
- 6th Progress Report: the referendum, 2001
- 7th Progress Report: Parliament, 2002

The second committee also published two commissioned works:

- A new electoral system for Ireland?, by Michael Laver (1998)
- Bunreacht na hÉireann: a study of the Irish text, by Micheál Ó Cearúil (1999)

==== Third committee ====
The Third All-Party Oireachtas Committee on the Constitution (2002–2007) was chaired by Fianna Fáil TD Denis O'Donovan. It described its task as being to "complete the programme of constitutional amendments begun by the earlier committees, aimed at renewing the Constitution in all its parts, for implementation over a number of years". It described the job as "unprecedented", noting that "no other state with the referendum as its sole mechanism for constitutional change has set itself so ambitious an objective".

The committee divided its work into considering three types of amendment:

- technical/editorial: changes in form but not in substance, for example changing "he" to "he or she" where it is clear that a provision in the Constitution applies to both men and women.
- non-contentious: changes in substance generally agreeable to the people, for example describing the President as Head of State.
- contentious: changes in substance which of their nature divide people, for example changes in the character and scope of human rights.

The Third All-Party Committee published three reports:

- 8th Progress Report: Government, 2003
- 9th Progress Report: Private Property, 2004
- 10th Progress Report: The Family, 2006

== See also ==
Comparable acts concerning ex-Dominion sovereignty

- Statute of Westminster Adoption Act 1942 and Australia Act 1986
- Canada Act 1982
- Constitution of India
- New Zealand's Statute of Westminster Adoption Act 1947 and Constitution Act 1986
- Pakistan Constitution of 1956
- Status of the Union Act, 1934 and South African Constitution of 1961
- Sri Lankan Constitution of 1972
