= James Geoghegan =

Irish politician and judge (1886–1951)

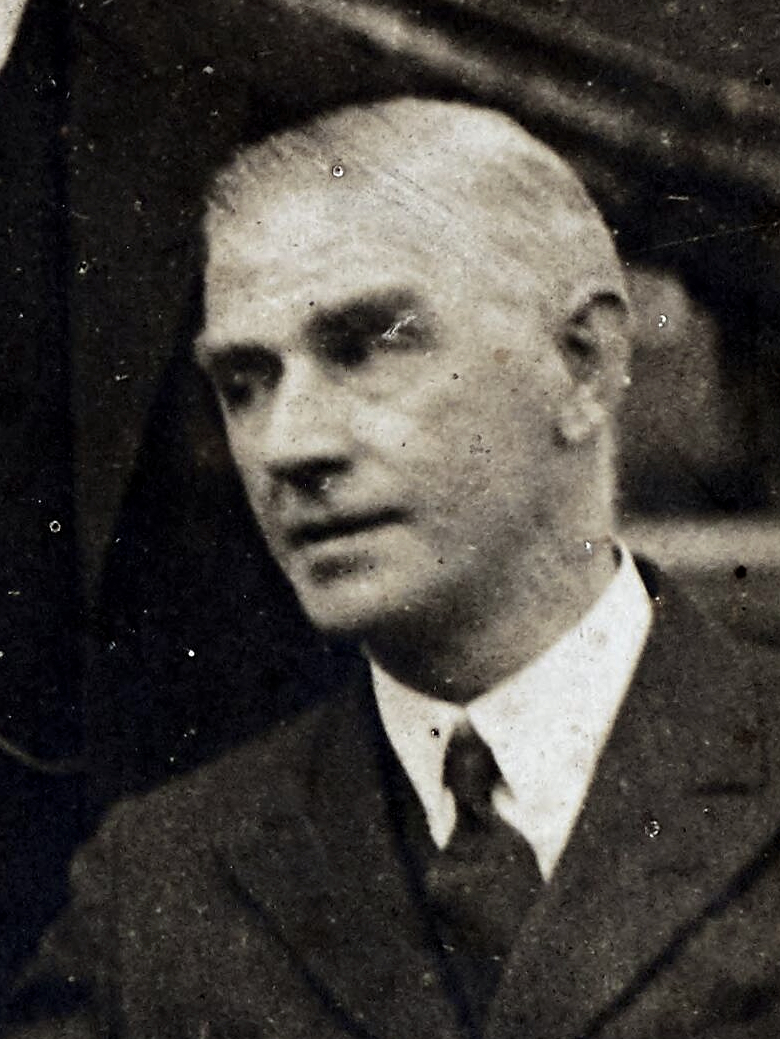
- Geoghegan in 1932

Judge of the Supreme Court
- In office 22 December 1936 – 23 April 1950
- Nominated by: Government of Ireland
- Appointed by: Douglas Hyde

Attorney General of Ireland
- In office 2 November 1936 – 22 December 1936
- President: Éamon de Valera
- Preceded by: Conor Maguire
- Succeeded by: Patrick Lynch

Minister for Justice
- In office 9 March 1932 – 8 February 1933
- President: Éamon de Valera
- Preceded by: James FitzGerald-Kenney
- Succeeded by: P. J. Ruttledge

Teachta Dála
- In office June 1930 – 23 December 1936
- Constituency: Longford–Westmeath

Personal details
- Born: 8 December 1886 Mullingar, County Westmeath, Ireland
- Died: 27 March 1951 (aged 64) Portobello, Dublin, Ireland
- Party: Fianna Fáil
- Spouse: Eileen Murphy (m. 1928)
- Children: 2, including Hugh
- Relatives: Mary Finlay Geoghegan (daughter-in-law)
- Education: University College Dublin; King's Inns

James Geoghegan (8 December 1886 – 27 March 1951) was an Irish Fianna Fáil politician, barrister and judge who served as a Judge of the Supreme Court from 1936 to 1950, Attorney General of Ireland from November 1936 to December 1936 and Minister for Justice from 1932 to 1933. He also served as a Teachta Dála (TD) for the Longford–Westmeath constituency from 1930 to 1936.

== Early life ==
Geoghegan was born in Walshestown, County Westmeath, the son of Thomas Geoghegan, a farmer, and his wife Bridget (née Carney). He was educated at CBS Mullingar.

== Career ==
Geoghegan was admitted as a solicitor at the age of 21 and practised in County Cavan and County Monaghan. Relinquishing the solicitor side of the profession, he was called to the Bar of Ireland on 1 November 1915 and to the Bar of England in 1923. He practised successfully as junior counsel before becoming a senior counsel in 1925.

Geoghegan had been a pro-Treaty Redmondite and had joined Cumann na nGaedheal in the early 1920s. He came into contact with Fianna Fáil when he was among those advising Éamon de Valera on the payment of land annuities, and in 1930, he joined that party. He was elected to Dáil Éireann in a by-election on 13 June 1930 as a Fianna Fáil TD for Longford–Westmeath. When Fianna Fáil took office in March 1932, he was appointed Minister for Justice. This was a sensitive post, coming in the first change of government since the Civil War. As well as being fitted by his legal expertise, the choice of Geoghegan, with his Cumann na nGaedheal background, offered the opposition reassurance as to de Valera's intentions. He held the post for almost a year. He resumed his law career when a new government was formed in February 1933 after the 1933 general election. One of Geoghegan's last acts as minister was to sign an order deporting James Gralton from Ireland, the only Irish citizen ever to be deported by the Irish state. The historian Dónall Ó Drisceoil has suggested that Geoghegan's position as a Knight of Saint Columbanus was why he gave into Catholic Church pressure to deport the "communist" Gralton.

Over the next few years, he represented the government in several important legal actions.

In 1936, Geoghegan became Attorney General of Ireland, serving for less than two months. In his brief tenure, he assisted the government in the preparation and enactment of the External Relations Act on 12 December 1936, before being appointed a judge of the Supreme Court on 22 December 1936, vacating his seat in the Dáil. Geoghegan remained on the bench of the Supreme Court until his retirement due to ill health in April 1950. His son, Hugh Geoghegan enjoyed the distinction in 2000 of being the first appointee to Ireland's Supreme Court to follow in his father's footsteps.

== Later life and death ==
Geoghegan had suffered ill health for several years before his retirement. He died in Portobello House, Dublin on 27 March 1951.

Political offices
Preceded by James FitzGerald-Kenney	Minister for Justice; 1932–1933	Succeeded by P. J. Ruttledge
Legal offices
Preceded by Conor Maguire	Attorney General of Ireland; Nov.–Dec. 1936	Succeeded by Patrick Lynch

Dáil	Election	Deputy (Party)	Deputy (Party)	Deputy (Party)	Deputy (Party)	Deputy (Party)
2nd	1921	Lorcan Robbins (SF)	Seán Mac Eoin (SF)	Joseph McGuinness (SF)	Laurence Ginnell (SF)	4 seats 1921–1923
3rd	1922	John Lyons (Lab)	Seán Mac Eoin (PT-SF)	Francis McGuinness (PT-SF)	Laurence Ginnell (AT-SF)	4 seats 1921–1923
4th	1923	John Lyons (Ind.)	Conor Byrne (Rep)	James Killane (Rep)	Patrick Shaw (CnaG)	Patrick McKenna (FP)
5th	1927 (Jun)	Henry Broderick (Lab)	Michael Kennedy (FF)	James Victory (FF)	Patrick Shaw (CnaG)	Hugh Garahan (FP)
6th	1927 (Sep)	Henry Broderick (Lab)	Michael Kennedy (FF)	James Killane (FF)	Patrick Shaw (CnaG)	Michael Connolly (CnaG)
6th	1930 by-election	Henry Broderick (Lab)	Michael Kennedy (FF)	James Geoghegan (FF)	Patrick Shaw (CnaG)	Michael Connolly (CnaG)
7th	1932	Francis Gormley (FF)	Michael Kennedy (FF)	James Geoghegan (FF)	Patrick Shaw (CnaG)	Seán Mac Eoin (CnaG)
8th	1933	James Victory (FF)	Michael Kennedy (FF)	James Geoghegan (FF)	Charles Fagan (NCP)	Seán Mac Eoin (CnaG)
9th	1937	Constituency abolished. See Athlone–Longford and Meath–Westmeath				

Dáil	Election	Deputy (Party)	Deputy (Party)	Deputy (Party)	Deputy (Party)	Deputy (Party)
13th	1948	Erskine H. Childers (FF)	Thomas Carter (FF)	Michael Kennedy (FF)	Seán Mac Eoin (FG)	Charles Fagan (Ind.)
14th	1951	Erskine H. Childers (FF)	Frank Carter (FF)	Michael Kennedy (FF)	Seán Mac Eoin (FG)	Charles Fagan (Ind.)
15th	1954	Erskine H. Childers (FF)	Frank Carter (FF)	Michael Kennedy (FF)	Seán Mac Eoin (FG)	Charles Fagan (FG)
16th	1957	Erskine H. Childers (FF)	Ruairí Ó Brádaigh (SF)	Michael Kennedy (FF)	Seán Mac Eoin (FG)	Charles Fagan (FG)
17th	1961	Frank Carter (FF)	Joe Sheridan (Ind.)	Michael Kennedy (FF)	Seán Mac Eoin (FG)	4 seats 1961–1992
18th	1965	Frank Carter (FF)	Joe Sheridan (Ind.)	Patrick Lenihan (FF)	Gerry L'Estrange (FG)	4 seats 1961–1992
19th	1969	Frank Carter (FF)	Joe Sheridan (Ind.)	Patrick Lenihan (FF)	Gerry L'Estrange (FG)	4 seats 1961–1992
19th	1970 by-election	Frank Carter (FF)	Joe Sheridan (Ind.)	Patrick Cooney (FG)	Gerry L'Estrange (FG)	4 seats 1961–1992
20th	1973	Frank Carter (FF)	Joe Sheridan (Ind.)	Patrick Cooney (FG)	Gerry L'Estrange (FG)	4 seats 1961–1992
21st	1977	Albert Reynolds (FF)	Joe Sheridan (Ind.)	Seán Keegan (FF)	Gerry L'Estrange (FG)	4 seats 1961–1992
22nd	1981	Albert Reynolds (FF)	Patrick Cooney (FG)	Seán Keegan (FF)	Gerry L'Estrange (FG)	4 seats 1961–1992
23rd	1982 (Feb)	Albert Reynolds (FF)	Patrick Cooney (FG)	Seán Keegan (FF)	Gerry L'Estrange (FG)	4 seats 1961–1992
24th	1982 (Nov)	Albert Reynolds (FF)	Patrick Cooney (FG)	Mary O'Rourke (FF)	Gerry L'Estrange (FG)	4 seats 1961–1992
25th	1987	Albert Reynolds (FF)	Patrick Cooney (FG)	Mary O'Rourke (FF)	Henry Abbott (FF)	4 seats 1961–1992
26th	1989	Albert Reynolds (FF)	Louis Belton (FG)	Mary O'Rourke (FF)	Paul McGrath (FG)	4 seats 1961–1992
27th	1992	Constituency abolished. See Longford–Roscommon and Westmeath				

Dáil	Election	Deputy (Party)	Deputy (Party)	Deputy (Party)	Deputy (Party)	Deputy (Party)
30th	2007	Willie Penrose (Lab)	Peter Kelly (FF)	Mary O'Rourke (FF)	James Bannon (FG)	4 seats 2007–2024
31st	2011	Willie Penrose (Lab)	Robert Troy (FF)	Nicky McFadden (FG)	James Bannon (FG)	4 seats 2007–2024
31st	2014 by-election	Willie Penrose (Lab)	Robert Troy (FF)	Gabrielle McFadden (FG)	James Bannon (FG)	4 seats 2007–2024
32nd	2016	Willie Penrose (Lab)	Robert Troy (FF)	Kevin "Boxer" Moran (Ind.)	Peter Burke (FG)	4 seats 2007–2024
33rd	2020	Sorca Clarke (SF)	Robert Troy (FF)	Joe Flaherty (FF)	Peter Burke (FG)	4 seats 2007–2024
34th	2024	Sorca Clarke (SF)	Robert Troy (FF)	Kevin "Boxer" Moran (Ind.)	Peter Burke (FG)	Micheál Carrigy (FG)
