= Kate O'Connell =

Irish former politician (born 1980)

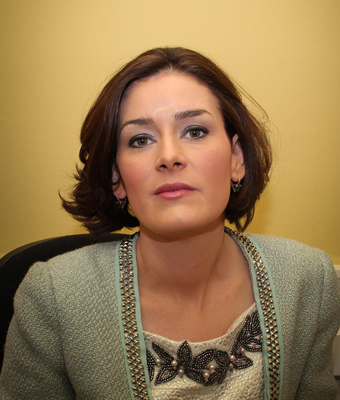
- O'Connell in 2016

Teachta Dála
- In office February 2016 – February 2020
- Constituency: Dublin Bay South

Personal details
- Born: Katherine Newman; 3 January 1980 (age 46) Kilbeggan, County Westmeath, Ireland
- Party: Independent
- Other political affiliations: Fine Gael (until 2024)
- Spouse: Morgan O'Connell (m. 2008)
- Children: 3
- Education: University of Brighton
- Profession: Pharmacist

Katherine O'Connell (née Newman; born 3 January 1980) is an Irish former Fine Gael politician who served as a Teachta Dála (TD) for the Dublin Bay South constituency from 2016 to 2020. During her time in the Dáil, O'Connell campaigned in favour of abortion rights as well as pushing for more funding for healthcare services in Ireland.

== Background ==
O'Connell is from Kilbeggan, County Westmeath. From 1999 to 2003, she studied to be a pharmacist at the University of Brighton, graduating with an M Pharm in the United Kingdom. She then worked as a hospital pre-registrar in the Surrey and Sussex Healthcare NHS Trust, before returning to Ireland to practice as a locum-pharmacist. By 2006, O'Connell and her husband opened up their first pharmacy in Sandyford, and later opened up pharmacies in Rathgar, and Rathfarnham.

== Political career ==
O'Connell was a member of Dublin City Council for the local electoral area of Rathgar–Rathmines from 2014 to 2016.

O'Connell was selected by Fine Gael for the 2016 general election to "recapture" their seat in Dublin Bay South from Lucinda Creighton, who had left the party in 2013 over her objection to the party's position on abortion and in 2015 founded Renua, an anti-abortion party. During the campaign, O'Connell called Creighton's anti-abortion views "incredibly sanctimonious" and suggested that Creighton was an "out of touch career politician" whose views on abortion were borne out of a lack of connection with the real world. The Irish Independent referred to these comments as O'Connell "tearing strips off" of Creighton. In the election, O'Connell was elected, while Creighton lost her seat.

In her time in the Dáil, O'Connell campaigned in favour of abortion rights as well as pushing for more funding for healthcare services in Ireland.

In October 2016 O'Connell responded to comments by the Archbishop of Dublin Diarmuid Martin that TDs should remember their faith when legislating for abortion in Ireland by stating "I don't see why the archbishop's views are in any way relevant. I don't see why Archbishop Martin should be getting involved in women's health issues. It is the same as asking my four-year-old. They [the Church] are entitled to their opinion, but I don't put any weight in them. I don't see what involvement the Catholic Church should have in women's health issues".

In November 2017 O'Connell confronted Barry Walsh, a member of Fine Gael's executive council, with a dossier of tweets documenting that he repeatedly and frequently derogated women politicians, often calling them bitches, including fellow members of Fine Gael. After the leader of Fine Gael and Taoiseach Leo Varadkar commented that Walsh should resign, he did so.

O'Connell lost her seat at the 2020 general election, placing 5th in the 4-seat constituency. In an August 2020 interview, O'Connell attributed her loss, in part, to being the running mate of the Minister for Housing, Eoghan Murphy, in an election lately fought over an ongoing housing crisis in Ireland.

On 7 May 2021, O'Connell declared she would not seek to be the Fine Gael candidate for the 2021 Dublin Bay South by-election. O'Connell suggested she would not be able to win a party selection again due to her relationship with the Fine Gael leadership souring in the meantime, partially because of her vocal support of Simon Coveney over Leo Varadkar in the 2017 Fine Gael leadership election. O'Connell also suggested many local Fine Gael branch members in Dublin South Bay regarded her as an outsider and a "parachute candidate" due to the fact she is originally from County Westmeath, and had turned against her over this. The Phoenix offered the view that O'Connell would not be nominated because she had turned the Fine Gael leadership against her while lobbying for her sister Mary Newman Julian to be the party's candidate in a 2018 Seanad by-election. In particular, a meeting between her and Simon Coveney in which O'Connell's expectations were read as entitled was cited as hurting her relationships. Fine Gael's candidate in the by-election was James Geoghegan, who had previously left the party to join Lucinda Creighton in Renua, but returned to Fine Gael after that party collapsed. Geoghegan lost the by-election to Labour's Ivana Bacik, a senator for Dublin University and veteran pro-choice campaigner.

In October 2024, O'Connell left Fine Gael to contest the next general election in Dublin Bay South as an independent candidate. She failed to be elected or to achieve the one-quarter of the quota necessary to recoup her election expenses.

== Political views and profile ==
O'Connell has been described by Irish political commentators and other politicians as one of the most outspoken (social) liberals and progressives in Irish politics, whose views and rhetoric often bristle against her opponents, including more conservative members of her party before she became an independent. During a confrontation between O'Connell and Barry Walsh in 2017, Walsh called his fellow party member O'Connell typical of "hard left" politicians. The Phoenix has referred to O'Connell as Fine Gael's "most prominent Feminist" and praised her for not shrinking away from difficult debates in the Dáil over abortion. The Phoenix has also suggested that while O'Connell's outspokenness was praised by Fine Gael members when directed at opponents, equally she has caused internal discontent whenever she turned her criticisms inward, leading to her alienation from certain factions in the party. The view that O'Connell was "alienating" was reiterated by an anonymous party source in July 2021.

In 2018 O'Connell was on the forefront of Fine Gael's campaign to secure a Yes vote in that year's referendum on the repeal of the 8th amendment, the piece of the Irish constitution which forbade abortion.

It was also in 2018 that O'Connell expressed the views that tax should be removed from the sale of condoms, that free contraception should be made available to women, that cannabis should be legalised and that Ireland should move to the eventual decriminalisation of all drugs. O'Connell stated "My views on this are very liberal, I am very much pro-decriminalisation of all drugs. I think we should take the money out of the drug trade and then you deal with the drug trade. Look at what is going on we see it every week, bloodbaths over drug crime, it's been going on for years".

During her time in Fine Gael, O'Connell was reported to have had a difficult relationship with party leader Leo Varadkar, and following Varadkar's resignation as Fine Gael leader in 2024, O'Connell said that his resignation marked the "end of a dark enough chapter" in her life.

In March 2020 Justine McCarthy, writing for The Times, accused Catholic conservative journalist John McGuirk of writing a hit piece on O'Connell that lambasted her for her liberalism. McCarthy opined that Irish politics needed more, not fewer politicians like O'Connell, and that McGuirk was a hypocrite for not levelling his same criticisms at male members of Fine Gael.

== Personal life ==
O'Connell has stated her family, the Newmans, have been "involved in Fine Gael since the 1960s", starting when O'Connell's maternal grandfather ran for Fine Gael as a councillor. Her father Michael Newman was also a Fine Gael councillor while Fine Gael minister Patrick Cooney was considered a family friend. O'Connell has stated that growing up, she and her family were greatly influenced by the progressive politics of Fine Gael leader Garret FitzGerald. Her sister Mary Newman Julian is also active in politics and has contested elections for the Dáil in Tipperary and for Seanad Éireann, while another sister, Theresa Newman, worked for a period as O'Connell's political adviser in Leinster House. Her brother-in-law Hugh O'Connell is a prominent political journalist and editor who has worked for several Irish publications.

In 2018 during debates in the Dáil regarding abortion, O'Connell disclosed personal details of a traumatic pregnancy she herself had experienced. During the pregnancy, she was told her child would only have a 10% chance of survival. This prompted O'Connell to have to consider terminating the pregnancy. Ultimately, O'Connell decided to continue the pregnancy. O'Connell's child was born with organs outside of their body but survived the birth. O'Connell cites the difficult decisions made during that pregnancy as having greatly informed her views on abortion.

Dáil	Election	Deputy (Party)	Deputy (Party)	Deputy (Party)	Deputy (Party)
32nd	2016	Eamon Ryan (GP)	Jim O'Callaghan (FF)	Kate O'Connell (FG)	Eoghan Murphy (FG)
33rd	2020	Eamon Ryan (GP)	Jim O'Callaghan (FF)	Chris Andrews (SF)	Eoghan Murphy (FG)
33rd	2021 by-election	Eamon Ryan (GP)	Jim O'Callaghan (FF)	Chris Andrews (SF)	Ivana Bacik (Lab)
34th	2024	James Geoghegan (FG)	Jim O'Callaghan (FF)	Eoin Hayes (SD)	Ivana Bacik (Lab)
