= Ivana Bacik =

Irish politician (born 1968)

Ivana Bacik TD
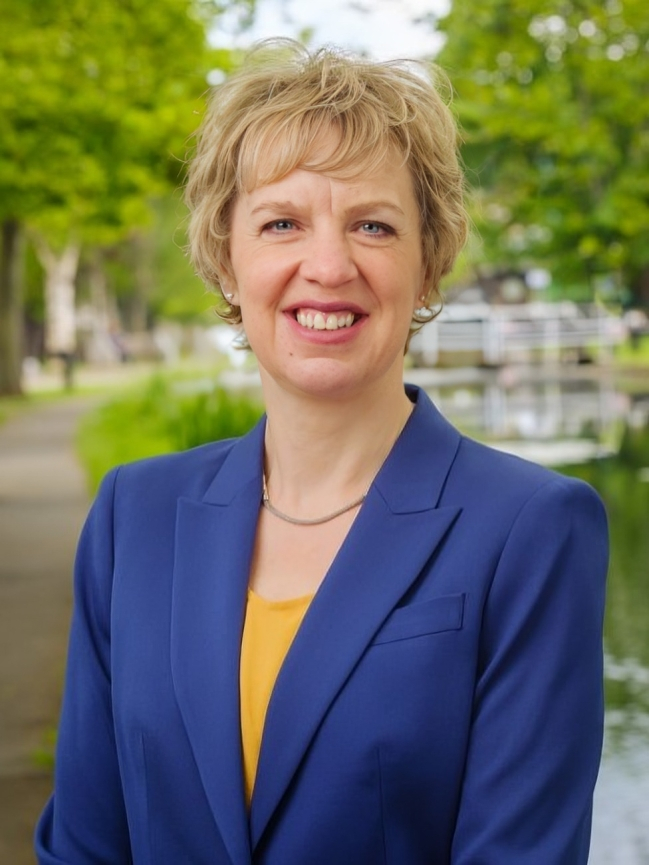
- Bacik in 2021

Leader of the Labour Party
- Incumbent
- Assumed office 24 March 2022
- Preceded by: Alan Kelly

Teachta Dála
- Incumbent
- Assumed office 9 July 2021
- Constituency: Dublin Bay South

Leader of the Labour Party in the Seanad
- In office 25 May 2011 – 9 July 2021
- Leader: Eamon Gilmore; Joan Burton; Brendan Howlin; Alan Kelly
- Preceded by: Phil Prendergast
- Succeeded by: Rebecca Moynihan

Deputy leader of the Seanad
- In office 25 May 2011 – 6 May 2016
- Taoiseach: Enda Kenny
- Leader: Maurice Cummins
- Preceded by: Dan Boyle
- Succeeded by: Catherine Noone

Senator
- In office 13 September 2007 – 12 July 2021
- Constituency: Dublin University

Personal details
- Born: 25 May 1968 (age 58) Dublin, Ireland
- Party: Labour Party
- Spouse: Alan Saul
- Children: 2
- Relatives: Charles Bacik (grandfather)
- Education: Trinity College Dublin; London School of Economics
- Website: ivanabacik.com
- Ivana Bacik's voice (0:51) Interview recorded December 2022, outside Leinster House

Ivana Catherine Bacik (Note: Both Ivana and her father Charles spell their surname as "Bacik" in English to conform to the English alphabet, but the family surname was originally "Bačík" when using Czech orthography. Had Ivana been born in the Czech Republic, her surname would actually have been "Bačíková" per the Czech cultural custom of adding a feminine suffix. See Czech name for more.) (/ˈbɑːtʃɪk/) (born 25 May 1968) is an Irish politician who has been the leader of the Labour Party since 24 March 2022 and a Teachta Dála (TD) for the Dublin Bay South constituency since winning a by-election on 9 July 2021. Bacik previously served as leader of the Labour Party in the Seanad from 2011 to 2021, and a Senator for the Dublin University constituency from 2007 to 2021. She previously served as deputy leader of the Seanad from 2011 to 2016. Bacik came to prominence due to her abortion rights campaigning from the 1980s onwards.

== Personal life and education ==
Bacik's paternal grandfather, Charles Bacik, was a Czech factory owner who moved to Ireland in 1946. He eventually settled in Waterford and in 1947 was involved in the establishment of Waterford Crystal. Her mother's side of the family are Murphys from County Clare. Her father was an astronomer and was employed in a number of locations. As a result, she lived in London and South Africa, before moving to Crookstown, County Cork, twenty miles west of Cork City, aged six, when he became a physics lecturer in the Cork Institute of Technology. She attended the nearby national school in Cloughduv. When Bacik was 11 years old, her family moved to the Sunday's Well area of Cork City. At the age of 14, she moved to Dublin.

She won a scholarship to board at Alexandra College in Milltown, Dublin, and was awarded a sizarship at Trinity College Dublin. She has an LL.B. from Trinity and an LL.M. from the London School of Economics.

She lives with husband Alan Saul and their two daughters in Portobello, Dublin.

== University politics ==
Bacik resigned as president of Trinity College Dublin Students' Union in 1990, after breaking the mandate from the Union membership regarding voting for candidates at a Union of Students in Ireland conference. Despite 13 TCD representatives being mandated to vote for one candidate, Martin Whelan, a former TCD SU president, it transpired that he received only 12 votes, Bacik's vote instead being given to the feminist former UCD SU officer, Karen Quinlivan. A controversy erupted in the Students' Union and a subsequent internal investigation led to Bacik's resignation.

She was taken to court by the anti-abortion group, the Society for the Protection of the Unborn Child (SPUC), for providing information on abortion. SPUC were successful in the court case, although that success came in the 1990s, long after Bacik had graduated from Trinity College. A High Court injunction had been ordered against Bacik and other members of the TCD Students' Union in October 1989. In November 1989, Bacik was informed by the Gardaí that the Union of Students in Ireland (USI) and the TCD Students' Union were under investigation following complaints that "they were corrupting the public morals by disseminating information on abortion." In an article she wrote for the International Planned Parenthood Federation, she said it was soon-to-be Irish President Mary Robinson that prevented her and students' union members from going to prison.

== Political career and campaigns ==
=== Early career ===
Bacik contested the Seanad Éireann elections in 1997 and 2002 as an independent candidate for the Dublin University constituency but was not successful.

She ran as a Labour Party candidate at the 2004 election to the European Parliament in the Dublin constituency. She ran with sitting MEP Proinsias De Rossa, who was also the party president, on the same ticket. She polled 40,707 first preference votes (9.6%) but was not elected.

In 2004, her book Kicking and Screaming: Dragging Ireland into the 21st Century, was published by O'Brien Press.

=== Seanad (2007–2021) ===
In 2007, she contested the Seanad Éireann elections for the third time in the Dublin University constituency, and was elected to the third seat, behind sitting Independent senators Shane Ross and David Norris. She initially sat as an Independent senator.

In February 2009, Bacik was included in an 'All Star Women's Cabinet' in the Irish Independent. In March 2009, Bacik confirmed claims made on a TV programme that she had taken two voluntary pay cuts of 10% in addition to a pension levy. In June 2009, Bacik was the Labour Party candidate for the Dublin Central by-election she came in third with 17% of the first preference votes. She joined the Labour Party group in the Seanad in September 2009, and became Labour Party Seanad spokesperson for both Justice and Arts, Sports and Tourism. In November 2009, a feature by Mary Kenny of the Irish Independent included Bacik in a list of women who "well deserved their iconic status."

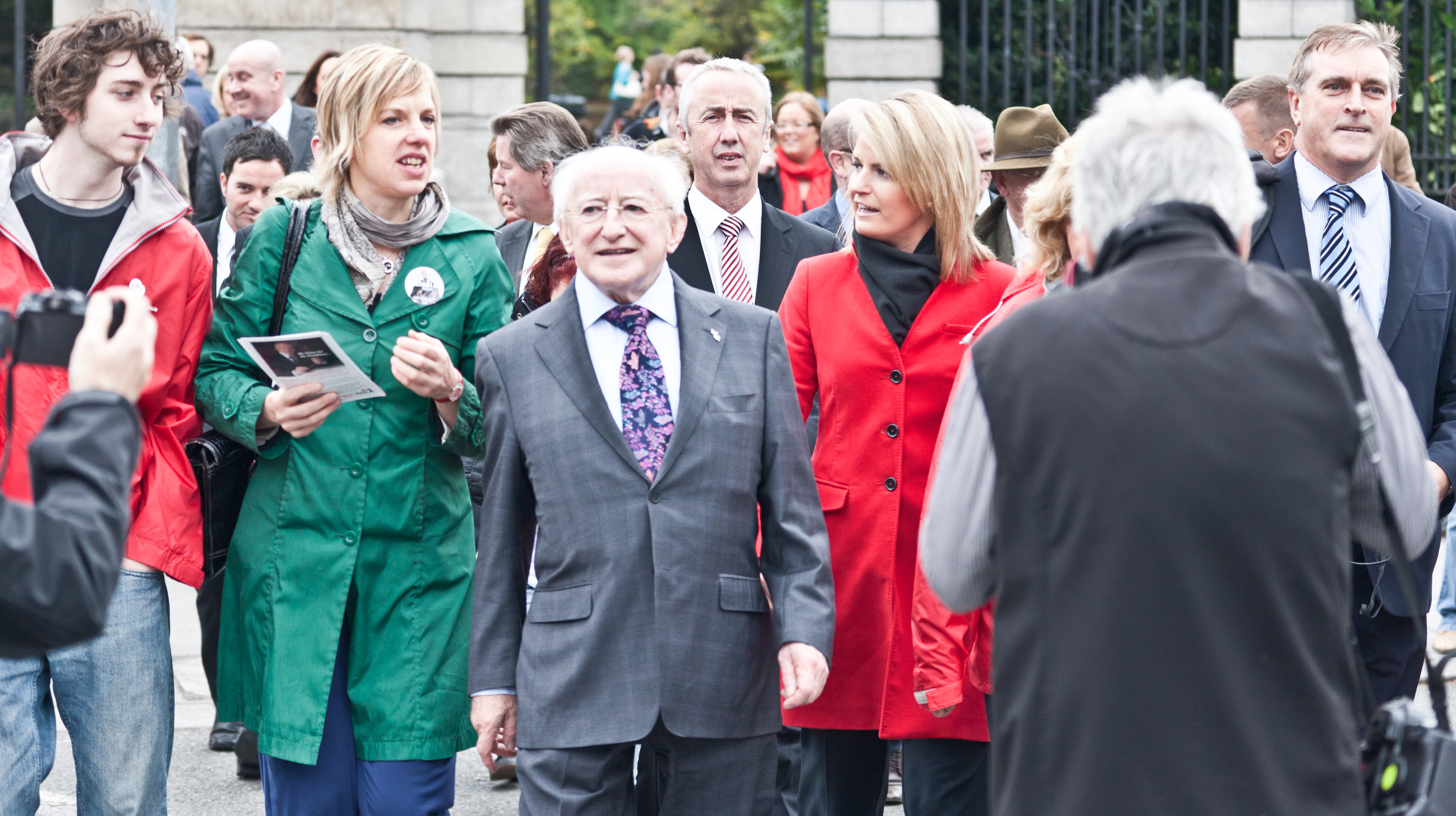
Bacik campaigning with Michael D. Higgins during his successful 2011 presidential bid

In May 2010, she sought Labour's nomination to contest the next election in the Dublin South-East constituency but was not selected. In December 2010, she was added to the ticket as the second candidate beside Labour Party leader, Eamon Gilmore, in the Dún Laoghaire constituency for the 2011 general election. Gilmore topped the poll, with Bacik receiving 10.1% of first preference votes but she was not elected. She was re-elected to Seanad Éireann at the subsequent election, after which she became Deputy leader of the Seanad. She held her seat in the Seanad in 2016 and in 2020.

=== Dáil (2021–present) ===
On 27 April 2021, after the resignation of Eoghan Murphy from his Dáil seat in Dublin Bay South, Bacik announced her intention to stand in the upcoming by-election. She campaigned with an emphasis on providing affordable housing, as well as improving healthcare and childcare, tackling climate change, and achieving "a true republic in which church and state are separated". During the campaign, she described herself as having "more bills passed into law than any other Senator, on issues such as workers' conditions, women's health rights, and LGBT equality". Bacik also campaigned on increasing the number of sports amenities for children in the area, calling for unused Defence Forces football fields at the Cathal Brugha Barracks to be freed up for local sports, with the suggestion rejected by Fine Gael Minister for Defence Simon Coveney. Fine Gael complained to RTÉ after she featured prominently on National Treasures, a prime-time TV show broadcast by RTÉ during the campaign. RTÉ has strict rules about fair coverage of candidates during campaigns. The national broadcaster blamed an "inadvertent error" for the programme being shown three days before the election. A steering group within the broadcaster told Fine Gael that "the broadcast should not have happened." Consequentially, RTÉ had to show a special report on the by-election on Prime Time to "ensure fair coverage is given to all candidates".

Bacik won this election, receiving 8,131 (30.2%) first-preference votes. It was her fourth attempt as a Labour candidate, and she expressed her delight at the success at the count centre in the RDS. Following the election, she was described by the Irish Times as "a formidable activist and public intellectual" and that Fine Gael's perceived antipathy towards their former TD, Kate O'Connell, may have contributed to the surge in support to Bacik from women voters. The newspaper claimed that her election was "a long overdue morale boost" for Labour.

In August 2021, Bacik apologised for attending Katherine Zappone's controversial party in the Merrion Hotel, Dublin, in July of that year. She stated that she believed that it took place within existing COVID-19 pandemic restrictions.

At the 2024 general election, Bacik was re-elected to the Dáil.

=== Labour Party leader (2022–present) ===
In March 2022, Bacik confirmed she would run to succeed Alan Kelly as Labour Party leader. Kelly stated that he believed that Bacik would succeed him. On 24 March 2022 she was confirmed as Labour Party leader unopposed at a party conference in Dublin. In a speech, she said she would focus on the rising cost of living and the serious and global problems facing the country. Bacik pledged that Labour would fight the next election as a "standalone party" rather than joining any left-wing alliance.

At the 2024 general election, Labour won 11 seats, making it tied with the Social Democrats as the fourth-largest party in the Dáil. It received 4.7% of preference votes, a modest increase from 2020.

In the 34th Dáil, Labour has been noted as closer to Sinn Féin and other left-wing parties, drawing both praise and criticism. In November 2025, Bacik's address to the party's annual conference was called a "major step-change" by The Irish Times analyst Harry McGee. In it, Bacik affirmed the party's identity as "Connollyite Republican" and called for Irish unity and a new form of republic.

At the 2025 Irish presidential election, Bacik and the Labour Party supported Catherine Connolly, who was elected on a left-wing unity ticket.

== Political views ==
Bacik's policies have been described as liberal and social democratic; In 2022, Bacik described herself as a "socialist, a social democrat and as centre-left. That means that I stand for constructive politics, of seeking to deliver change by going into government". As leader of the Labour Party, Bacik has tried to reconcile the party with Irish republicanism by underlining Labour's connection to James Connolly, as well as by advocating for a structured preparation for a border poll, including a clear timeline, citizens' assemblies, and the creation of a dedicated government department for unity planning.

=== Social and domestic policy ===
Since 2007 Bacik has spoken in support of the legalisation of cannabis. She has proposed that cannabis should be sold under license at music festivals in Ireland such as Electric Picnic, calling for a "rational" approach to drugs.

In May 2019, following the results of the Mother and Baby Homes Commission of Investigation which found that hundreds of children had died while in the care of homes run by the Catholic Church, Bacik called for the government to take financial action against the religious orders involved.

In 2020, she sponsored legislation in the Seanad to grant Irish citizenship to any child born on the island of Ireland, which resulted in the Irish citizenship laws being changed in March 2021.

In December 2020, she called for foreign frontline medical workers fighting against the COVID-19 pandemic in Ireland to be rewarded with fast-tracked citizenship applications, as has been done in France.

In 2022, Bacik called for a pay rise for workers and a windfall tax on energy companies, and an increase in the minimum wage.

Bacik has stated she is in favour of decriminalising sex work, though she is critical of the Nordic Model, which criminalises the purchase of sex. She has expressed support for the views of organisations like Amnesty International and the Sex Work Research Hub, which advocate for the total decriminalisation of sex work, while raising concerns about the growing exploitation in legalised systems, citing her research and discussions with those involved in the trade in Sweden. Bacik acknowledges that the term "sex worker" may be problematic for many survivors, but she maintains that "the realities of sex work" are undeniable, as described by former workers.

On economic issues, Bacik supports the redistribution of wealth through progressive taxation, including the introduction of property taxes and carbon taxes. She believes that Sinn Féin's refusal to support a property tax is populist and contradictory to their left-wing stance. Bacik has long advocated for an inclusive, red-green alliance focused on environmental and economic equality, which she views as the key to addressing the climate emergency.

=== Foreign policy ===
Bacik is a supporter of Palestine, and has expressed a desire to see Irish support for Palestine "reflected in government policies". In September 2006, Bacik was one of the 61 Irish academic signatories of a letter published in The Irish Times calling for an academic boycott of the state of Israel. In January 2009, she declared that she wants Ireland to break off diplomatic relations with Israel and in February 2009 called for a general boycott of Israeli goods. After the Israeli invasion of the Gaza Strip in 2023, Bacik called for a ceasefire in an Irish Independent opinion piece, and said the position of Israeli ambassador to Ireland, Dana Erlich, "should now be under question" following comments Erlich made.

In 2022 Bacik commended the Irish government for its response to Russian invasion of Ukraine, particularly for its intake of over 20,000 refugees. She has also called for stronger actions at the EU and UN levels, including the expulsion of the Russian ambassador, and condemned Putin's aggressive foreign policy, drawing on her personal family history to underscore her opposition to Russian authoritarianism.

=== Housing ===
In March 2023, she stated that the year's eviction ban was intended to provide the government with breathing space to increase housing supply and that the government's targets fell short.

== Legal work ==
Bacik was appointed Reid Professor of Criminal Law, Criminology and Penology at Trinity College Dublin (TCD) Law School in 1996. She taught courses in criminal law; criminology and penology; and feminist theory and law at Trinity. Her research interests include criminal law and criminology, constitutional law, feminist theories and law, human rights and equality issues in law. Bacik was made a Fellow of Trinity College Dublin in 2005. In 2022 she resigned her role as associate professor in the university. However, as of May 2024 she continues to be listed as Reid Professor and is currently designated as an adjunct assistant professor on the Trinity College website.

Bacik has also practiced as a barrister. In 2006, she acted as junior counsel in Zappone v. Revenue Commissioners, the unsuccessful High Court case brought by Katherine Zappone and Ann Louise Gilligan over the non-recognition of their Canadian same-sex marriage by the Revenue Commissioners.

== Awards ==
In 2019, Bacik was chosen by the Irish Women Lawyers Association as Irish Woman Lawyer of the Year. In 2019, she was selected as Irish Tatler's 'Woman of the Year.'

== Electoral history ==
Elections to the Dáil, Seanad and European Parliament
Party	Election		FPv	FPv%	Result
Independent	Dublin University	1997	885	6.6	Eliminated on count 5/6
Independent	Dublin University	2002	1,591	11.2	Eliminated on count 9/10
Labour	Dublin	2004	40,707	9.7	Eliminated on count 5/6
Independent	Dublin University	2007	2,794	16.5	Elected on count 8/8
Labour	Dublin Central	2009	4,926	17.3	Eliminated on count of 7/8
Labour	Dún Laoghaire	2011	5,749	10.1	Eliminated on count of 9/11
Labour	Dublin University	2011	2,982	19.2	Elected on count 10/18
Labour	Dublin University	2016	2,853	17.8	Elected on count 13/15
Labour	Dublin University	2020	3,489	23.2	Elected on count 6/8
Labour	Dublin Bay South	2021	8,131	30.2	Elected on count of 9/9
Labour	Dublin Bay South	2024	5,684	14.3	Elected on count of 9/12

== See also ==
- List of atheists in politics and law

Party political offices
Preceded by Alan Kelly	Leader of the Labour Party; 2022–present	Incumbent

Dáil	Election	Deputy (Party)	Deputy (Party)	Deputy (Party)	Deputy (Party)
32nd	2016	Eamon Ryan (GP)	Jim O'Callaghan (FF)	Kate O'Connell (FG)	Eoghan Murphy (FG)
33rd	2020	Eamon Ryan (GP)	Jim O'Callaghan (FF)	Chris Andrews (SF)	Eoghan Murphy (FG)
33rd	2021 by-election	Eamon Ryan (GP)	Jim O'Callaghan (FF)	Chris Andrews (SF)	Ivana Bacik (Lab)
34th	2024	James Geoghegan (FG)	Jim O'Callaghan (FF)	Eoin Hayes (SD)	Ivana Bacik (Lab)
