= 2021 Dublin Bay South by-election =

By-election to the 33rd Dáil

- 8 July 2021
- Turnout: 27,044 (34.7%)
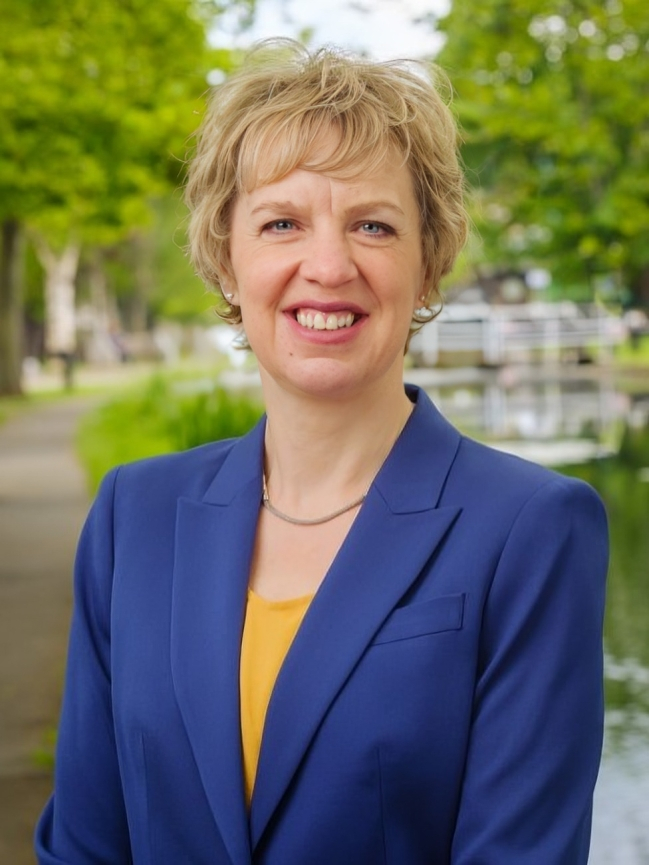

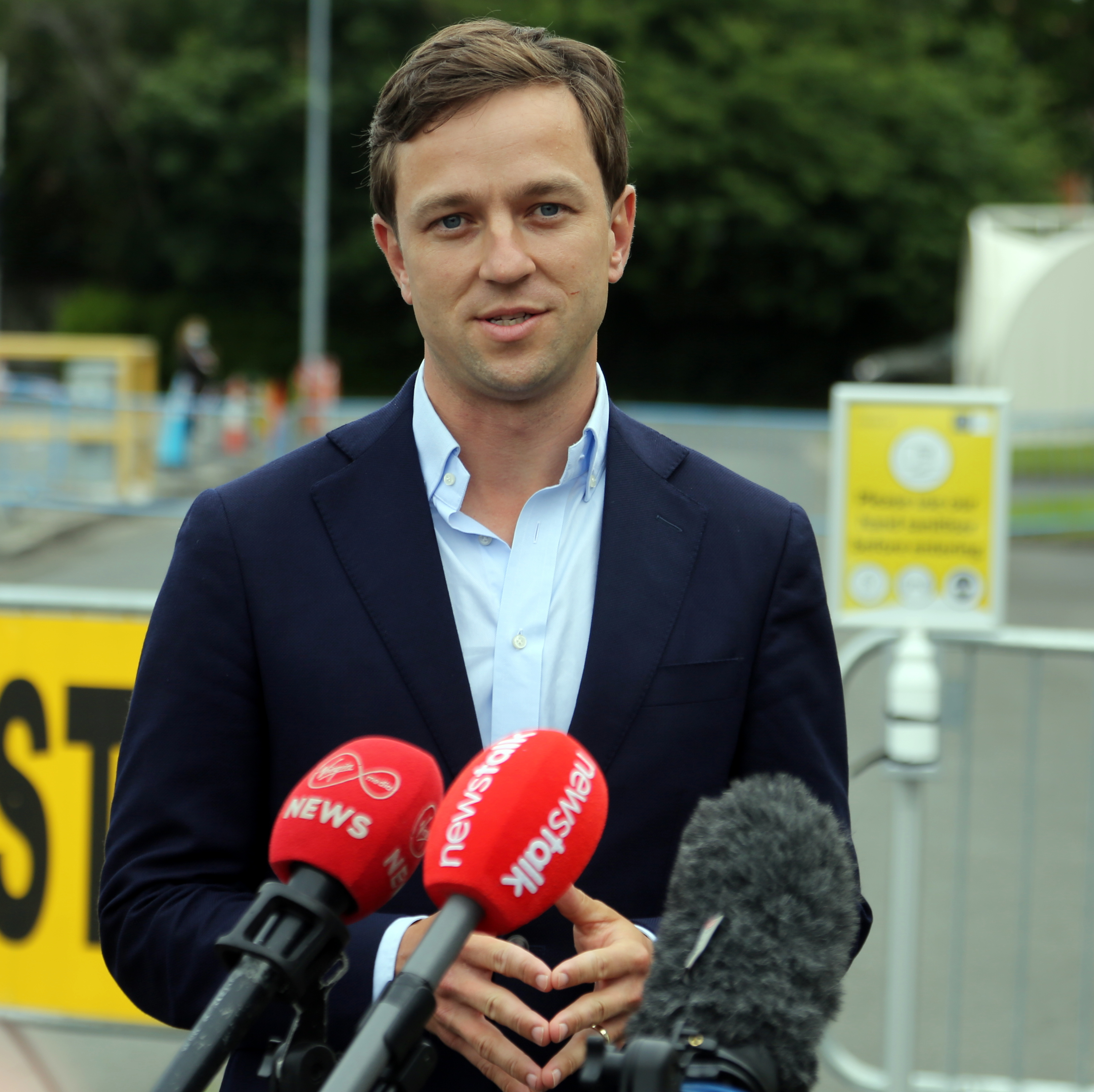

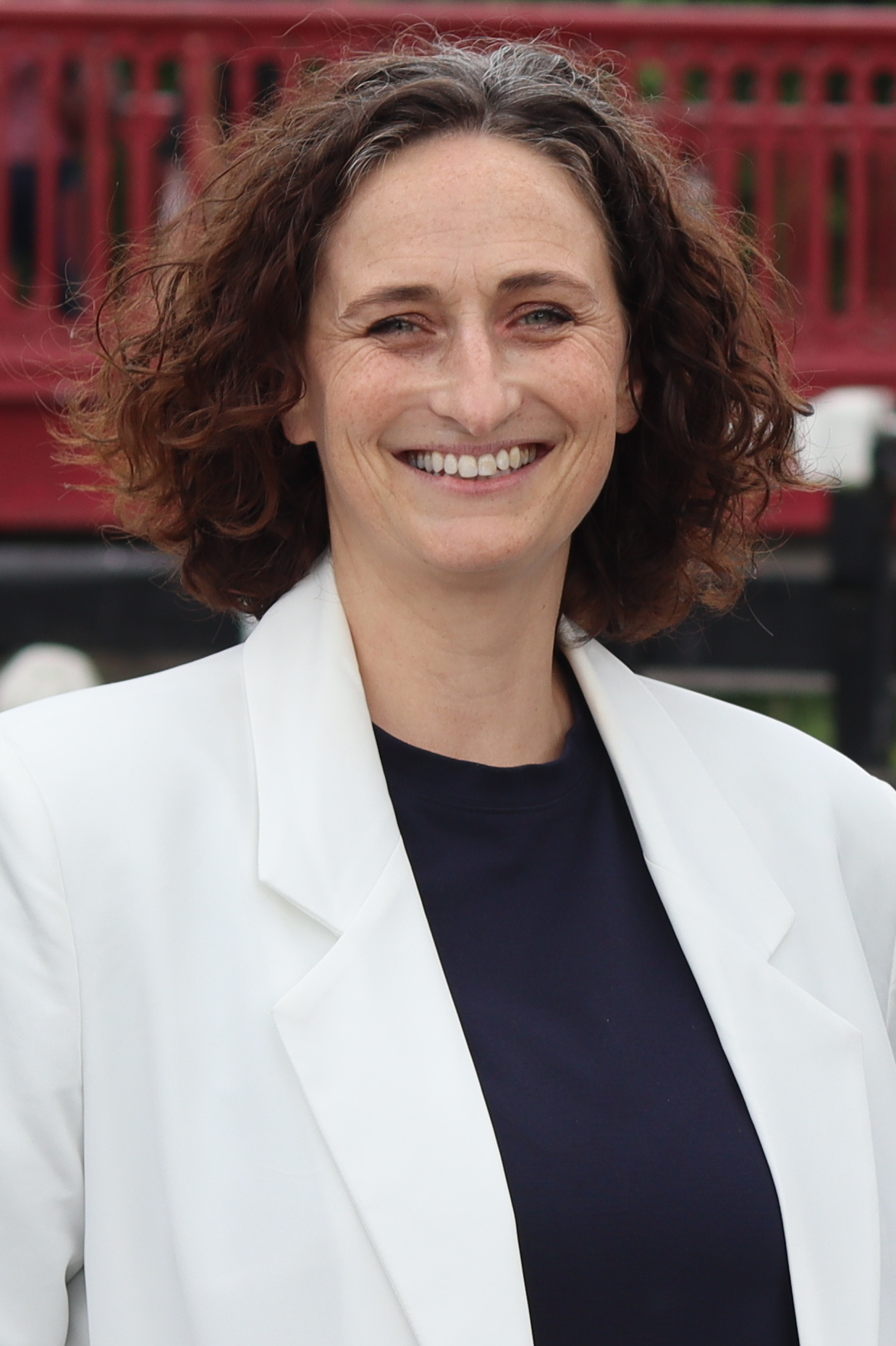
Nominee	Ivana Bacik	James Geoghegan	Lynn Boylan
Party	Labour	Fine Gael	Sinn Féin
First preferences	8,131	7,052	4,245
Percentage	30.2%	26.2%	15.8%
Final count	13,382	9,235	–
- Dublin Bay South shown within County Dublin
TD before election
Eoghan Murphy
Fine Gael
TD after election
Ivana Bacik
Labour

A Dáil by-election was held in the constituency of Dublin Bay South in Ireland on Thursday, 8 July 2021, to fill a vacancy in the 33rd Dáil. It followed the resignation of Fine Gael Teachta Dála (TD) Eoghan Murphy. The by-election was won by Senator Ivana Bacik of the Labour Party.

Bacik was able to overcome low poll numbers nationally for the Labour Party as well as defy attempts by Fine Gael and Sinn Féin to define the by-election as an ideological showdown solely between the two of them. In stark contrast to Labour's success, the by-election was also noted for the disastrous result suffered by Fianna Fáil, with a number of publications declaring it the single worst election result in the party's tenured history.

Fifteen candidates were nominated, ten from political parties and five independents. The electorate was 72,302.

The polls closed at 22:30 on Thursday 8 July. The Irish Times predicted that the final turnout figure would be no more than 40%, and contrasted that with the 52% turnout in Dublin Bay South at the last general election. The count showed a turnout of 34.7%, which was higher than some predictions, and exceeded the 26% turnout at both the Dublin Fingal and Dublin Mid-West by-elections in 2019.

== Background ==
Eoghan Murphy was elected as a TD for Dublin South-East in the 2011 general election, a constituency covering most of what became the Dublin Bay South constituency in 2016. Murphy retained his seat at both the 2016 and 2020 general elections. Murphy served as Minister of State at the Department of Finance from 2016 to 2017.

A close ally of Fine Gael leader Leo Varadkar, he was a key figure in Varadkar's successful leadership campaign in 2017. When Varadkar became Taoiseach in June 2017, Murphy was appointed to the cabinet as the Minister for Housing, Planning and Local Government. After the February 2020 Irish general election, prolonged negotiations led to the formation in June 2020 of a three-party coalition government, to which Murphy was not appointed.

On 27 April 2021 Murphy resigned his seat to pursue a career in international affairs. The Electoral (Amendment) Act 2011 stipulates that a by-election in Ireland must be held within six months of a vacancy occurring. The writ was moved in the Dáil on 16 June 2021, and on the same day the polling order for the by-election was signed by Murphy's successor as Housing Minister, Darragh O'Brien. The order set the polling date as 8 July 2021.

=== Constituency profile ===
Dublin Bay South has been characterised as a "Fine Gael heartland" by some of the Irish national media, noting the area (as Dublin South-East) had been the seat of Fine Gael leaders John A. Costello and Garret FitzGerald and their historical performance in the area. However, it had also been the seat of party leaders Ruairi Quinn of the Labour Party, Michael McDowell of the Progressive Democrats, John Gormley of the Green Party and Eamon Ryan, former leader of the Green Party.

Dublin Bay South has been called "one of the most liberal constituencies in the country" as well as "one of the wealthiest". It had the highest vote in the 2018 referendum to repeal the Eighth Amendment of the Constitution, which prohibited abortion, and its main predecessor constituency Dublin South-East had the highest vote in favour of marriage equality in the 2015 referendum with 74.0% voting 'Yes'. It has been noted that between the Labour Party, the Green Party, the Social Democrats and Democratic Left, centre-left parties have won at least 29% of the vote in every election in the area between 1981 and 2021.

At the 2020 general election, Dublin Bay South was one of twelve constituencies (of a total of 39) which elected no women. Nine of the by-election candidates were women.

Half of adults in the constituency have been described as professionals, 57% of individuals have third-level qualifications, and 44% live in privately rented apartments.

=== Procedure ===
Every Irish and British citizen on the register of electors in the Dublin Bay South constituency could vote, with the electorate being 72,302. The election was held using single transferable vote, with the candidate elected when they either had the highest number of votes after all other candidates had been eliminated, or upon reaching the quota of over half the total valid votes.

The by-election was the first election to the Dáil since the COVID-19 pandemic began. It was conducted in accordance with COVID-19 public health advice, with extended polling hours of 07:00 IST and 22:30 IST on Thursday 8 July. Measures included having hand sanitisers at all polling stations, voters being asked to wear a mask and observe social distancing when voting, and each presiding officers' desk having a perspex screen. Voters were also asked to bring their own pen or pencil to mark the ballot paper, with pencils which did not need to be returned also available if required.

== Candidates ==
=== Candidate selection ===
On 7 May, Kate O'Connell declared she would not seek to be the Fine Gael candidate for the election. O'Connell had previously been a TD for the constituency between 2016 and 2020, but did not retain her seat in the 2020 general election, placing fifth in the four-seat constituency. O'Connell suggested she would not be able to win a party selection again due to her relationship with the Fine Gael leadership souring in the meantime.

Dublin City Councillor James Geoghegan announced his intention to seek the Fine Gael nomination on 31 April, noting that in the 2019 Dublin City Council election he had received the highest vote share of any Fine Gael candidate in Dublin. He also stressed that he had backed Leo Varadkar in the 2017 Fine Gael leadership election, whereas O'Connell had backed Varadkar's opponent Simon Coveney. Geoghegan won the support of all 12 party branches in Dublin Bay South. He was the only Fine Gael candidate to be nominated by party members as of the party deadline on 10 May, and was formally selected on 13 May.

The Lord Mayor of Dublin Hazel Chu and Dublin City Councillor Claire Byrne contested the Green Party nomination. At a selection convention on 4 June, Byrne was chosen as the party candidate.

Fianna Fáil councillors Deirdre Conroy and Claire O'Connor were reported as potential candidates for the party nomination. However, O'Connor declined to run. That left Conroy as the sole nominee as of the party deadline on 20 May, and on 25 May she was formally selected as the Fianna Fáil candidate. Conroy had been first elected as a councillor in the 2019 Dublin City Council election.

Senator Ivana Bacik was selected as the Labour Party candidate on 17 May, and Senator Lynn Boylan was selected as the Sinn Féin candidate on 4 June.

Sarah Durcan, who stood for the Social Democrats in Dublin Bay South in the 2020 general election, was the only nominee as of the party deadline and was named as the Social Democrats candidate on 2 June.

Mairéad Tóibín, a pharmacist, was selected as Aontú's candidate. She is a sister of Peadar Tóibín, the party's founder and then sole TD.

Mannix Flynn stood as an independent candidate. He said that he would be "throwing the kitchen sink" at his campaign.

On 27 May, Peter Dooley, the co-founder of the Dublin Renters' Union announced he would be running as an independent candidate. Justin Barrett was the National Party's candidate. On 11 June, Jacqui Gilbourne of Renua announced she would be running for the party. At an anti-lockdown rally on 19 June, Dolores Cahill announced that she would be running as an independent candidate.

Nominations for the by-election closed at noon on 24 June 2021. 15 candidates stood in the by-election, with ten from registered political parties, and five independents.

== Campaign ==
=== Aontú ===
Mairéad Tóibín campaigned on the platform of the housing crisis. At her campaign launch on 25 June, she called for an end to the tax advantages international property investors receive, stating it is pricing families out of the market. She also called "for a full investigation into the manner in which the government mismanaged" the spread of COVID-19 among residents of nursing homes in 2020, and criticised the Irish government and opposition for "going far beyond any other EU country" to attempt to achieve zero Covid.

=== Fianna Fáil ===
Deirdre Conroy, an architectural heritage consultant, campaigned to reduce pollution within the area, saying "I want to see people of all ages swimming in the bay and that means stopping pollution and getting rid of the untreated sewage". Conroy also campaigned on housing, crime, and transport, asking for "more Gardaí on the streets", providing additional funding for community policing and community groups, extending the MetroLink proposed in Dublin city, making sure "rents are affordable" and "reducing the numbers on our social housing waiting lists".

Jim O'Callaghan was selected as the Director of Elections for Deirdre Conroy's campaign.

In June 2021, Conroy's 2013 blog Diary of a Dublin Landlady was criticised, with posts referring to a Latvian tenant who was lodging in her home, in which Conroy criticised the smell of the tenant's cooking and him sending his child benefit payment back to Latvia, as well as stating she would not permit tenants to turn the heating on at night or have overnight guests. In another post, she considered renting a linen cupboard as housing to students, saying "the linen cupboard which is a perfectly nice single room, I could possibly put a student into". In response to the controversy, Conroy said "I had one bad experience with a tenant who happened to be from Latvia", and described herself as a "very inclusive person". Separately, Conroy is [when?] taking legal action over a fall during a skiing trip to Andorra in 2015.

=== Fine Gael ===
James Geoghegan described himself as "liberal and progressive" and described housing among his three main campaign priorities. He stated "I want to speak for a generation stuck in a rent trap or living in their parents' homes", and said he "is not a fan of co-living", a contrast to the Fine Gael incumbent Eoghan Murphy. When asked by journalists about his own circumstances, Geoghegan added that he had a mortgage on his home with his wife. He declined to comment on whether he had drawn on "the bank of mum and dad" for it, saying "we were lucky enough to put a deposit together" for the home. He stated his two other main campaign priorities are to "make Dublin a 15-minute city", and to invest in "childcare, education, and our work environment".

Geoghegan was criticised for being a founding member of Renua, the party which had been formed by Lucinda Creighton in 2015. Creighton had been expelled from the Fine Gael parliamentary party when she voted against the Protection of Life During Pregnancy Bill 2013, which had permitted abortion under certain limited circumstances. Geoghegan said he disagrees with Creighton's "social views on abortion", and "I certainly don't share any of the social views that I suppose that party subsequently became associated with". He said that he voted in favour of the repeal of the Eighth Amendment of the Constitution permitting the Oireachtas to legislate for abortion, and in favour of the Thirty-fourth Amendment of the Constitution which legalised same-sex marriage.

Following an article in The Irish Times by columnist Una Mullally criticising what the author claimed was Geoghegan's privileged family background, Fine Gael requested that people focus on Geoghegan's politics. The Irish Daily Mail subsequently complained that Geoghegan was refusing to answer questions on political issues, especially Fine Gael housing policy. Similarly, two podcasts covering Irish politics, The Echo Chamber Podcast and Una & Andrea's United Ireland podcast, complained that they had reached out to Geoghegan for interviews but he had refused all offers. Both podcasts had featured several other election candidates over the course of the campaign.

Simon Harris was appointed as the Director of Elections for Geoghegan's campaign. Geoghegan asked voters to give their further preferences to the candidates of the other government parties, Claire Byrne and Deirdre Conroy. The concept of a "voting pact" between the government parties was floated by Fine Gael towards the end of the campaign, but was rejected by both Fianna Fáil and the Green party.

On Wednesday 7 July 2021, the day before voting, Kate O'Connell announced she would be contacting the Garda Siochana after a fake message which she had not endorsed began circulating on WhatsApp. The message, coming from a user posing under the guise of an official O'Connell group, played off the perceived rivalry between O’Connell and Geoghegan reported upon during Fine Gael's candidate selection. It asked O'Connell's supporters to give their votes to Ivana Bacik, Claire Byrne, Deirdre Conroy, Sarah Durcan and Lynn Boylan rather than Fine Gael's candidate James Geoghegan.

Throughout the campaign, Fine Gael had sought to define the by-election as a clash between itself and Sinn Féin. The party held to this tactic even after The Irish Times published a poll showing that Ivana Bacik was emerging as the main contender, with Fine Gael sending out a tweet on election day warning their supporters that unless they voted, Sinn Féin would win.

=== Green Party ===
Byrne campaigned on providing more housing with improved standards, improving waste and recycling provisions, providing "multipurpose venues" to create and revitalise a "sustainable night-time economy", as well as being a female representative in a constituency without any female Teachtaí Dála, saying "I really believe only women can represent women effectively".

On 26 May Roderic O'Gorman was announced as the Director of Elections for the Green Party campaign. With the Green Party in a three-way coalition for government alongside Fianna Fáil and Fine Gael as of the 2020 Irish general election, O'Gorman said "This election will send a strong signal on what government priorities must be over the coming years. In Government, the Green Party is delivering climate action, social justice, and more liveable towns and cities." Byrne asked voters to give their second preference to Labour Party candidate Ivana Bacik.

=== Labour Party ===
Senator Ivana Bacik campaigned with an emphasis on providing affordable housing, saying "This Government is failing. It has no common purpose. And never is this more evident than in relation to housing", as well as improving healthcare and childcare, tackling climate change, and achieving "a true republic in which church and state are separated". Bacik described herself as having "more bills passed into law than any other Senator, on issues such as workers' conditions, women's health rights, and LGBT equality".

Bacik also campaigned on increasing the number of sports amenities for children in the area, calling for unused Defence Forces football fields at the Cathal Brugha Barracks to be freed up for local sports, a suggestion rejected by Fine Gael Minister for Defence Simon Coveney. During the campaign, Bacik also called for public investment in housing as a solution to the housing crisis.

Duncan Smith was selected as the Director of Elections for Bacik's campaign on 14 May. Bacik asked voters to give their further preferences to left and centre-left candidates.

=== Sinn Féin ===
Sinn Féin leader Mary Lou McDonald declared that the by-election would be fought by her party on the issue of housing; "It will be all about rents, affordable houses and social houses and the ongoing scandal of homelessness". Sinn Féin stated that they hoped to use their controversial Abú voter database to assist in their election campaign. On 1 June 2021, Senator Lynn Boylan was nominated as the Sinn Féin candidate.

During the campaign, Boylan received criticism from Fine Gael's by-election candidate James Geoghegan for her stance on the Special Criminal Court. Boylan asked voters to give their further preferences to left-wing candidates.

=== Social Democrats ===
On 2 June 2021, Sarah Durcan was chosen as the Social Democrats candidate for the by-election. She was the only person nominated at the selection convention.

She had unsuccessfully contested two previous elections for the Social Democrats. She stood in the South East Inner City local electoral area at the 2019 Dublin City Council election, and in Dublin Bay South at the 2020 general election.

Durcan has served on the boards of the Abbey Theatre, Theatre Forum and Gaze Film Festival. Durcan was a lead organiser of the #wakingthefeminists campaign which to achieve gender equality in Irish theatre, and describes herself as an "activist arts worker".

Following the announcement of her candidacy, Durcan declared that the by-election would be a "referendum" on the Government's housing and healthcare policies, and that it would be an opportunity to send a message to the government that "we should expect more". Durcan opined that the government had "put corporations and profits over communities, and shoddy short-term fixes over long-term benefits" and suggested that everyone should be able to access affordable housing and expect reasonable waiting times for healthcare services. Durcan asked voters to give their further preferences to those on the political left, and to women candidates.

=== People Before Profit ===
Brigid Purcell campaigned on reducing pollution in the area, as well as protesting against the temporary closure of Portobello Plaza, with Dublin City Council stating the area had been closed due to anti-social behaviour and disregard for COVID-19 restrictions. At her official campaign launch on 17 June, Purcell said she would campaign for workers and renters and spoke about her experiences as a worker mentioning her own experience of sexual harassment in Irish hospitality sector.

Purcell held 'open air' public meetings in the constituency with Gino Kenny in relation to cannabis legalisation and with Paul Murphy in support of rent controls.

=== National Party ===
The National Party announced Justin Barrett's candidacy in a YouTube video on 9 June 2021. During the campaign the National Party's GoFundMe was removed for violating its terms of service; it also emerged that Barrett was under criminal investigation by the Garda Síochána for breaching COVID-19 regulations, as well as road traffic offences. When queried about these issues, Barrett reportedly told The Times that it was "none of our business" and "You always lie, you're the lying press."

== Debates and media coverage ==
On 4 July a debate about the by-election was held on The Week in Politics on RTÉ One, featuring seven candidates from the parties who had placed highest in the 2020 general election. The remaining candidates were given the opportunity to be highlighted briefly midway during the broadcast in short pre-recorded clips. The five highest polling parties from 2020 had their candidates featured in another debate the next day on 5 July on Today with Claire Byrne on RTÉ Radio 1. Similarly to the television broadcast, the other candidates were briefly featured in short pre-recorded clips.

Aontú took legal action against RTÉ over the exclusion of their candidate from both broadcasts. Aontú suggested it was unfair that they were the only political party with a seat in Dáil Eireann not represented in the television broadcast. RTÉ stated that a steering committee had decided that the televised debates would feature the top seven parties based on their share of first preference votes in the 2020 general election while the radio debate would feature the top five, and that this criterion had been previously endorsed by a high court judge deciding on the matter.

On Sunday 3 July, RTÉ aired an episode of "National Treasures" which contained a segment exploring the family background of Labour's candidate Ivana Bacik. Subsequently, Fine Gael complained to RTÉ and suggested this gave undue coverage to her campaign. RTÉ responded by calling the situation an "inadvertent error" and to rectify it, they would air a special "extended report" on the by-election during Prime Time on Tuesday 6 July featuring all the other candidates in the by-election in order to ensure all candidates received "fair coverage". Social Democrats candidate Sarah Durcan dismissed the impact of the "National Treasures" episode.

== Opinion polls ==
=== First preferences ===
Last date of polling	Polling firm / Commissioner	Sample size	Geoghegan (FG)	Bacik (Lab)	Boylan (SF)	Byrne (GP)	Conroy (FF)	Durcan (SD)	Flynn (Ind)	Tóibín (Aon)	Purcell (PBP–S)	Barrett (NP)	Dooley (Ind)	O/I
27 June 2021	IPSOS MRBI/The Irish Times	553	27%	22%	13%	11%	10%	5%	5%	3%	2%	1%	1%	<1%

=== Second preferences ===
Last date of polling	Polling firm / Commissioner	Sample size	Geoghegan (FG)	Bacik (Lab)	Boylan (SF)	Byrne (GP)	Conroy (FF)
27 June 2021	IPSOS MRBI/The Irish Times	553	15%	19%	6%	25%	11%

=== Third preferences ===
Last date of polling	Polling firm / Commissioner	Sample size	Geoghegan (FG)	Bacik (Lab)	Boylan (SF)	Byrne (GP)	Conroy (FF)
27 June 2021	IPSOS MRBI/The Irish Times	553	10%	16%	4%	25%	13%

== Counting of votes ==
Counting of ballots got underway at 09:00 IST on Friday 9 July, in the RDS Simmonscourt Pavilion, with a final result predicted to be available between 19:00 and 20:00. One of the candidates, Dolores Cahill, was refused admission to the count centre as she refused to wear a mask. Around 15:00 IST, Lynn Boylan and Mary Lou McDonald on behalf of Sinn Féin conceded, noting that it was "Ivana's day".

=== Result ===
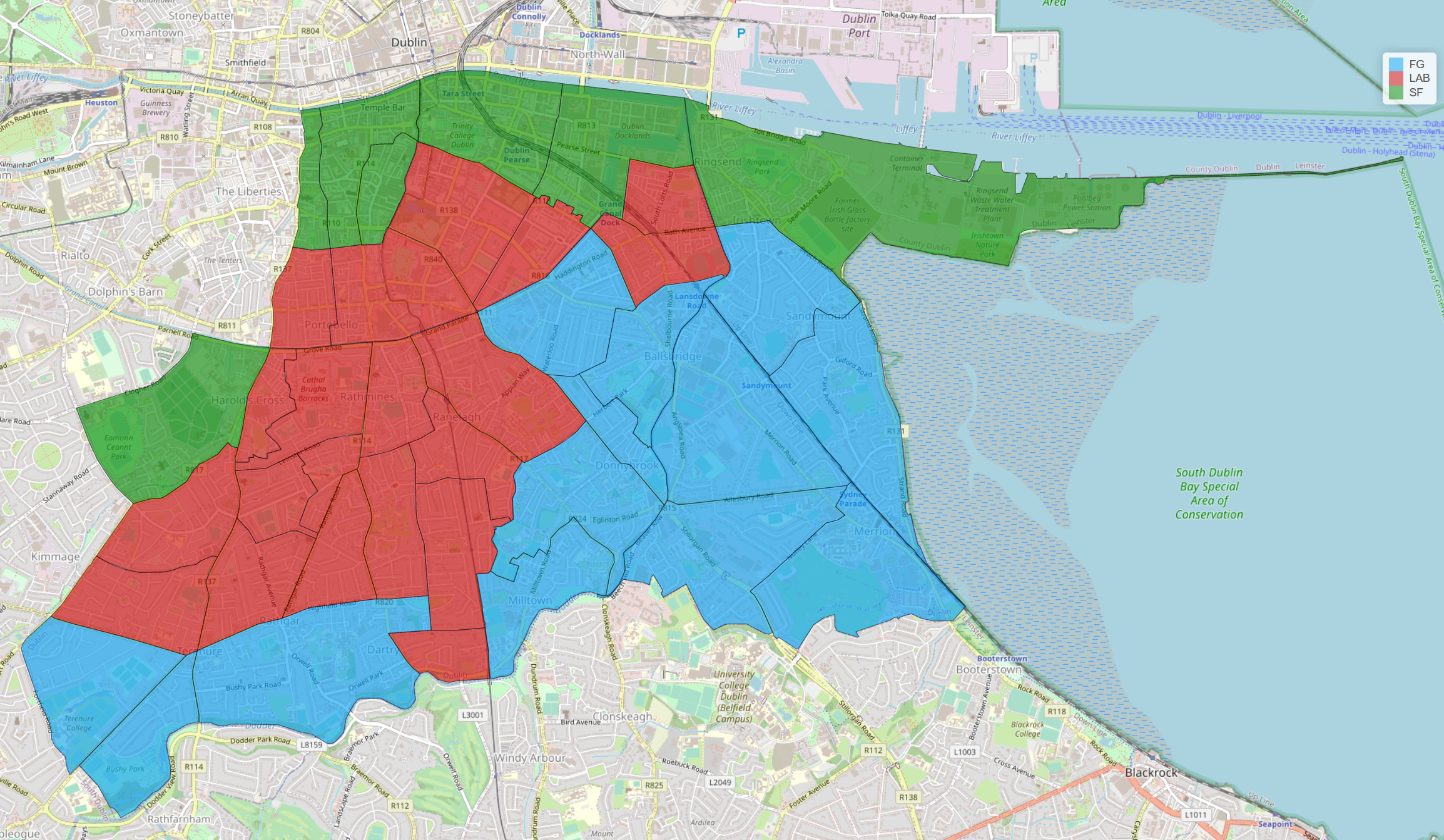
First-preference votes by local election area

2021 Dublin Bay South by-election
Party	Candidate	FPv%	Count								
Party	Candidate	FPv%	1	2	3	4	5	6	7	8	9
Labour	Ivana Bacik	30.2	8,131	8,134	8,146	8,188	8,308	8,380	8,851	9,474	13,382
Fine Gael	James Geoghegan	26.2	7,052	7,054	7,093	7,134	7,147	7,354	7,400	8,265	9,235
Sinn Féin	Lynn Boylan	15.8	4,245	4,245	4,246	4,357	4,695	4,779	4,985	5,237	
Green	Claire Byrne	8.0	2,157	2,164	2,170	2,197	2,264	2,360	2,610	2,985	
Fianna Fáil	Deirdre Conroy	4.6	1,247	1,250	1,256	1,278	1,288	1,380	1,402		
Independent	Mannix Flynn	3.3	879	882	894	975	1,003	1,120	1,181		
Social Democrats	Sarah Durcan	3.2	849	852	854	886	1,077	1,111			
PBP–Solidarity	Brigid Purcell (Note: Purcell is a member of People Before Profit.)	2.8	759	762	768	818					
Aontú	Mairéad Tóibín	2.8	740	745	798	940	958				
Independent	Peter Dooley	1.0	261	266	271						
National Party	Justin Barrett	0.7	183	186	194						
Independent	Dolores Cahill	0.6	169	171	179						
Renua	Jacqui Gilbourne	0.6	164	166							
Independent	John Keigher	0.1	23								
Independent	Colm O'Keeffe	0.1	23								
Electorate: 77,924 Valid: 26,882 Spoilt: 162 Quota: 13,442 Turnout: 27,044 (34.7%)

== Aftermath, reactions and consequences ==
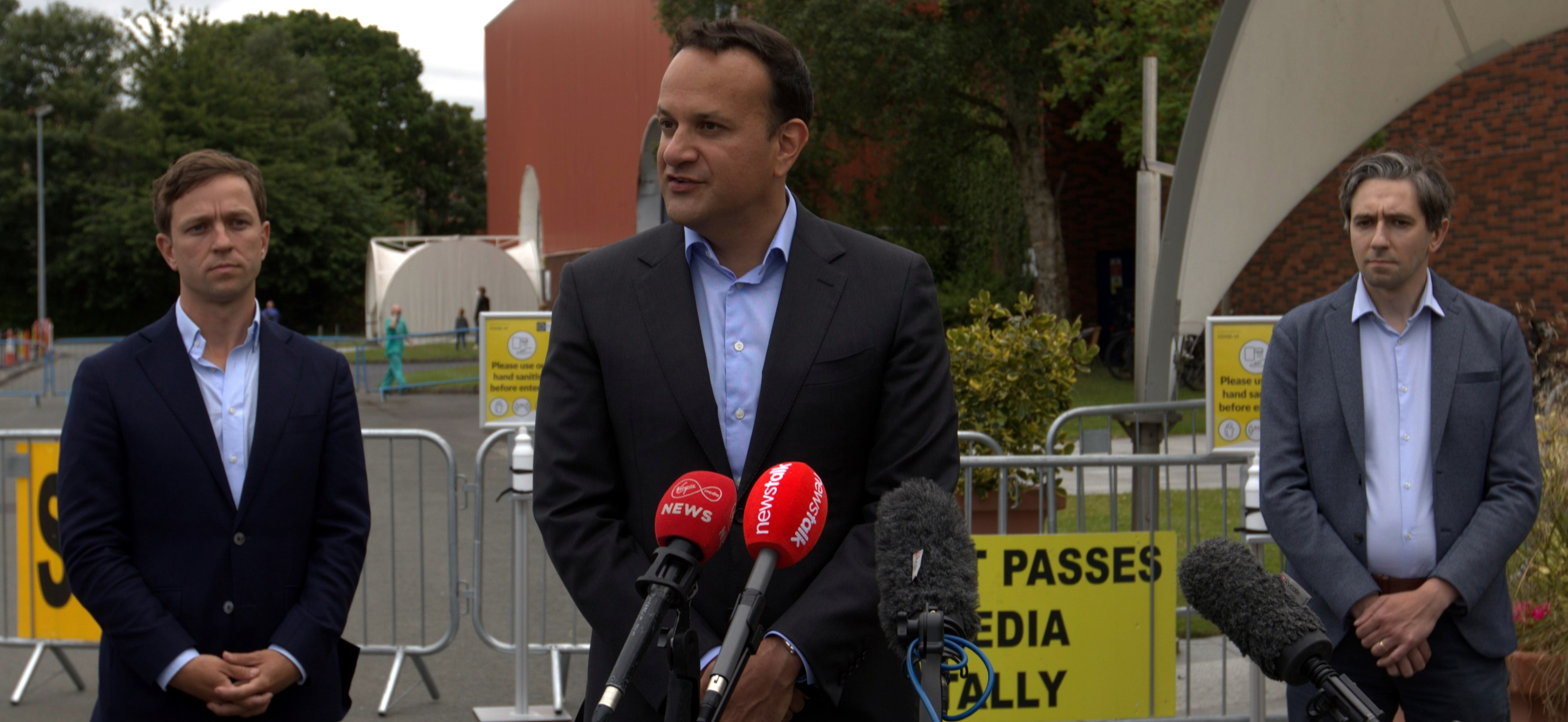
Leo Varadkar, flanked by James Geoghegan and Simon Harris, speaking with members of the media at the count centre

Reactions to the by-election were swift. A number of sources declared that the by-election might have been the single worst result in the history of Fianna Fáil and there was immediate speculation from inside and outside the party that the result could threaten the leadership of Micheál Martin. However, blame was also levelled against Fianna Fáil's director of elections Jim O'Callaghan, himself considered a rival and potential ouster of Martin. O'Callaghan called the result "disappointing" and publicly questioned if Martin was suitable to lead Fianna Fáil into the next general election. On 10 July 2021, Fianna Fáil TD Barry Cowen demanded an immediate in-person parliamentary party meeting to discuss Fianna Fáil's "alarming" performance in the by-election. The same day Fianna Fáil TD Cathal Crowe told RTÉ Radio 1 that, in his view, Micheál Martin should not lead the party into the next general election.

Similar discontent was felt in Fine Gael, with questions raised internally and externally of the wisdom of Leo Varadkar in endorsing James Geoghegan as the candidate instead of the potentially more popular Kate O'Connell. Varadkar publicly reaffirmed his support of Geoghegan and dismissed the notion that the defeat, which left the party with no TDs in an area considered its "heartland", was a negative reflection of his leadership.

Responding to the election outcome, Ivana Bacik thanked the voters and activists in the constituency, said that she and other candidates had run a "respectful and corteous campaign", and that she was "deeply honoured and so grateful to have received such an overwhelming support from across my home constituency here in Dublin Bay South." She added that Labour had emphasised the message around the issues the party championed, along with its core values. She added that this sends a message to the government that the mood among the electorate is for change.

Labour leader Alan Kelly congratulated Bacik, adding that he believes the Fine Gael versus Sinn Féin narrative has proven to be untrue, that the election had demonstrated Labour as a credible progressive, left-wing alternative. While offering their praise to Bacik for a well-managed campaign, analysts questioned if Labour would be able to replicate their success again in a general election. Bacik's victory was hailed a shot-in-the-arm to an ailing Labour party. Labour leader Alan Kelly declared "We’ll take the good days. We’ve taken enough bad days", speaking of the result. Ivana Bacik commented that she had received much support from people who were not Labour supporters but who share Labour's values, and that she was conscious of the tradition set out by former local Labour TD Ruairí Quinn throughout his career.

Sinn Féin leader Mary Lou McDonald praised the effort of their candidate Lynn Boylan while stating her belief that the result of the by-election demonstrated to her the time was right to call a general election. McDonald declared “It is now clear that we have a Government living on borrowed time. It is very clear that Government support in the constituency has collapsed”.

Seven months after the by-election, Bacik was elected unopposed as leader of the Labour Party.

== See also ==
- 2022 University of Dublin by-election
