= Jim O'Callaghan =

Irish politician (born 1968)

Jim O'Callaghan TD
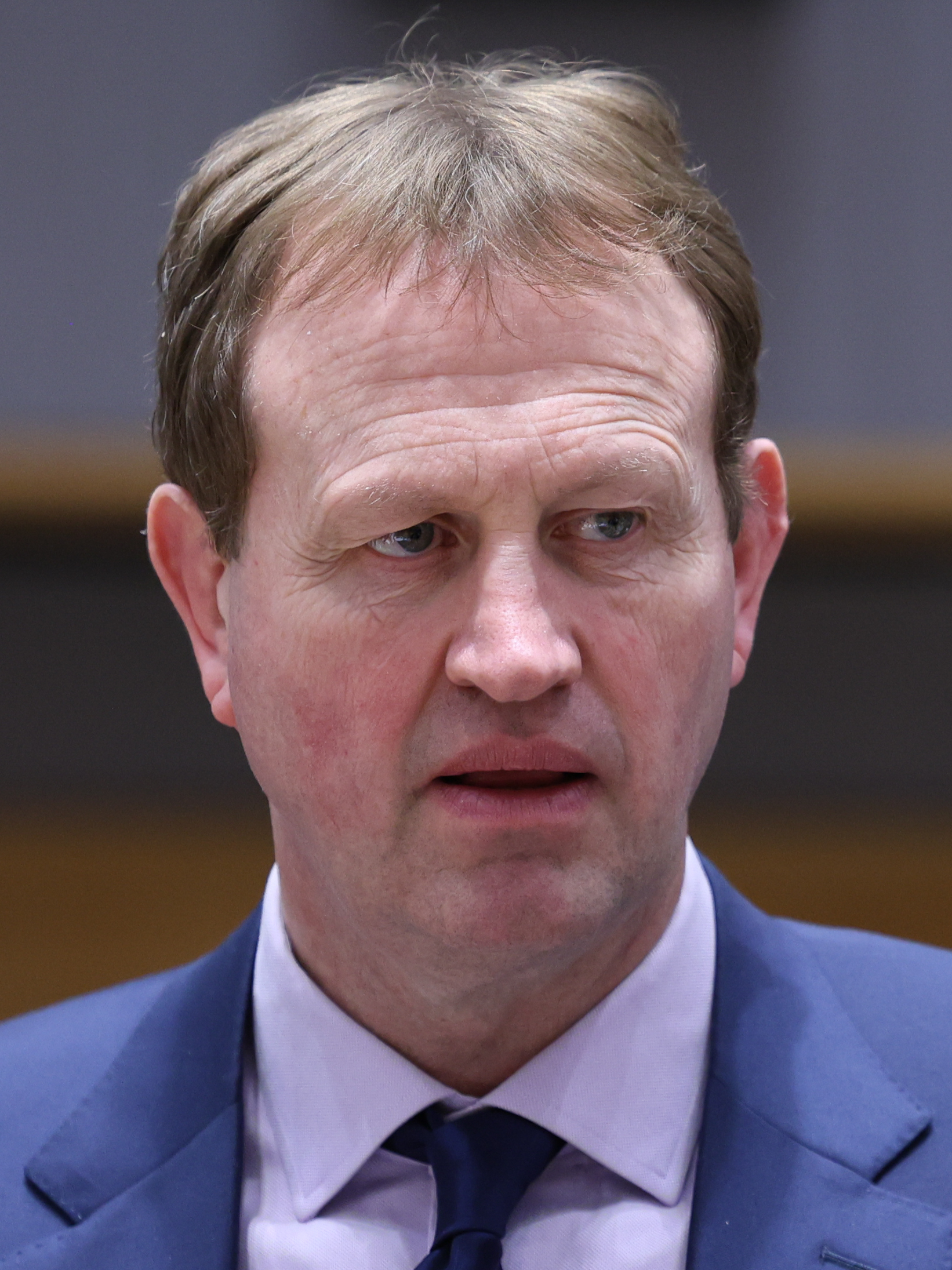
- O'Callaghan in 2025

Minister for Justice, Home Affairs and Migration
- Incumbent
- Assumed office 23 January 2025
- Taoiseach: Micheál Martin
- Preceded by: Helen McEntee

Teachta Dála
- Incumbent
- Assumed office February 2016
- Constituency: Dublin Bay South

Personal details
- Born: James O'Callaghan; 5 January 1968 (age 58) Dublin, Ireland
- Party: Fianna Fáil
- Spouse: Julie Liston (m. 1997)
- Children: 1
- Relatives: Miriam O'Callaghan (sister)
- Education: University College Dublin; Sidney Sussex College, Cambridge; King's Inns
- Website: jimocallaghan.com

Jim O'Callaghan (born 5 January 1968) is an Irish Fianna Fáil politician who has served as Minister for Justice, Home Affairs and Migration since January 2025. He has been a Teachta Dála (TD) for the Dublin Bay South constituency since the 2016 general election.

== Legal career ==
O'Callaghan has a BCL degree from University College Dublin, a master's degree in law and an M.Phil. in criminology from Sidney Sussex College, Cambridge, and a barrister-at-law degree from the King's Inns. O'Callaghan devilled for Rory Brady.

In 2000, he represented Taoiseach Bertie Ahern in defamation proceedings against a businessman, appearing with Rory Brady and Paul Gallagher, both of whom later served as Attorney General of Ireland. He was made a senior counsel in 2008. O'Callaghan also served as a legal adviser to Fianna Fáil from January 2011 to his election to the Dáil. In 2014, he co-edited a book titled, Law and Government: A Tribute to Rory Brady.

== Political career ==
O'Callaghan was a member of Dublin City Council from 2009 to 2016. He unsuccessfully ran as a candidate for Fianna Fáil at the 2007 general election for Dublin South-East. He was elected for Dublin Bay South at the 2016 general election on the 8th count.

He was a member of the Fianna Fáil negotiating team in talks on government formation in 2016. Early on 9 April 2016, O'Callaghan's home hosted a covert meeting between O'Callaghan, Leo Varadkar, Deirdre Gillane (chief adviser of Micheál Martin) and Andrew McDowell (a policy adviser of Enda Kenny). It lasted for more than an hour.

On 19 May 2016, he was appointed as Fianna Fáil Spokesperson for Justice and Equality by party leader Micheál Martin. He drafted and secured cross-party support for his Parole Bill which was passed by the Oireachtas and became an Act. It reformed the parole system giving victims of crime and their families the right to be heard during the parole process.

O'Callaghan also introduced a Judicial Appointments Commission Bill on 18 October 2016 that sought to amend the process by which judges were appointed. Although the Bill passed second stage in the Dáil, it was not supported by the Fine Gael minority government which instead pursued legislation proposed by the Minister for Transport, Shane Ross, though with changes.

In November 2016, O'Callaghan met with some of those who had been sexually abused as boys by Bill Kenneally, Fianna Fáil tallyman and cousin of former Fianna Fáil TD Brendan Kenneally. Brendan Kenneally had previously acknowledged that he had been aware of his cousin's crimes before his sentencing to 14 years imprisonment. On 10 July 2018 the Government established a Commission of Investigation under Judge Barry Hickson to investigate the Kenneally allegations.

During the 2018 referendum campaign to remove the constitutional prohibition of abortion by repealing the Eighth Amendment, O'Callaghan stated he was against the proposal to legalise abortion on request up to 12 weeks in pregnancy.

At the 2020 general election, O'Callaghan was re-elected as a TD for Dublin Bay South. In July 2020 O'Callaghan declined the position of Minister of State at the Department of Justice in the 32nd government of Ireland offered to him by Taoiseach Micheál Martin, stating that he wished to remain on the backbenches, providing a voice in Fianna Fáil outside of government, while also making the party more attractive to younger voters. In September 2020 O'Callaghan told RTÉ Radio he was interested in becoming the leader of Fianna Fáil following Martin.

O'Callaghan was appointed as the party's spokesman on justice matters by Martin on 17 December 2020.

O'Callaghan was the Fianna Fáil Director of Elections for the 2021 Dublin Bay South by-election in which the party's candidate came in fifth position.

At the 2024 general election, O'Callaghan was re-elected to the Dáil. On 23 January 2025, he was appointed as Minister for Justice, Home Affairs and Migration in the government led by Micheál Martin.

Elections to the Dáil
Party	Election		FPv	FPv%	Result
Fianna Fáil	Dublin South-East	2007	3,120	9.2	Eliminated on count 4/5
Fianna Fáil	Dublin Bay South	2016	4,575	11.5	Elected on count 8/8
Fianna Fáil	Dublin Bay South	2020	5,474	13.8	Elected on count 8/8
Fianna Fáil	Dublin Bay South	2024	5,536	13.9	Elected on count 10/12

== Personal life ==
He played rugby at a senior level, representing UCD, Cambridge University, London Irish, Wanderers, Leinster and Connacht. He was also capped for Ireland at under-21 level. He is a frequent cyclist, regularly cycling to Leinster House and advocates for the expansion of cycling infrastructure in Dublin.

He has four sisters, one of whom is the Irish broadcaster Miriam O'Callaghan.

Political offices
Preceded by Helen McEntee as Minister for Justice	Minister for Justice, Home Affairs and Migration; 2025–present	Incumbent

Dáil	Election	Deputy (Party)	Deputy (Party)	Deputy (Party)	Deputy (Party)
32nd	2016	Eamon Ryan (GP)	Jim O'Callaghan (FF)	Kate O'Connell (FG)	Eoghan Murphy (FG)
33rd	2020	Eamon Ryan (GP)	Jim O'Callaghan (FF)	Chris Andrews (SF)	Eoghan Murphy (FG)
33rd	2021 by-election	Eamon Ryan (GP)	Jim O'Callaghan (FF)	Chris Andrews (SF)	Ivana Bacik (Lab)
34th	2024	James Geoghegan (FG)	Jim O'Callaghan (FF)	Eoin Hayes (SD)	Ivana Bacik (Lab)
