= Držkov =

- Municipality
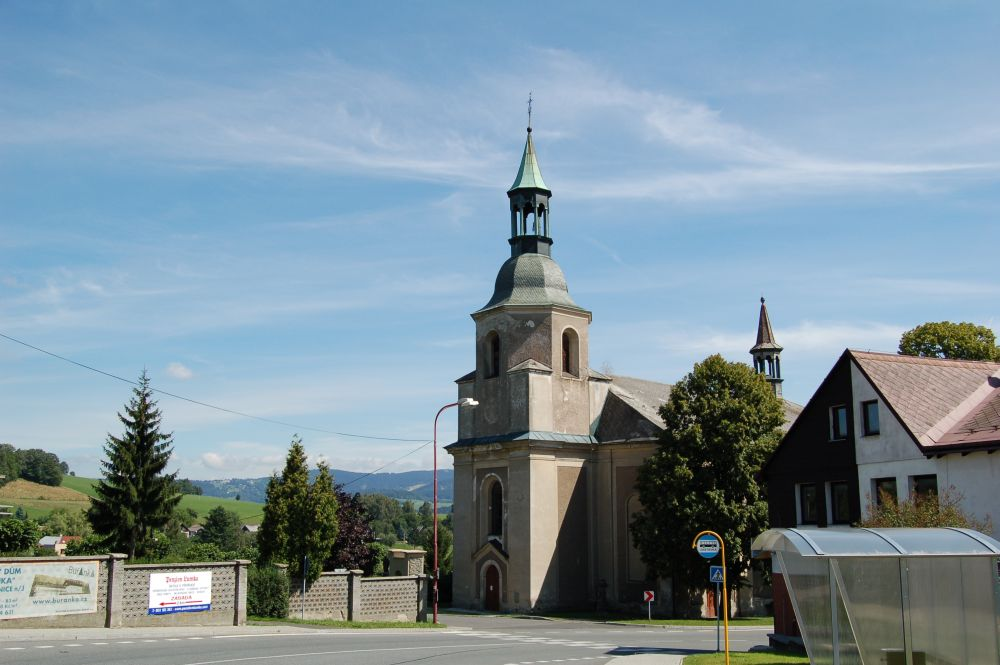
- Church of Saint Bartholomew

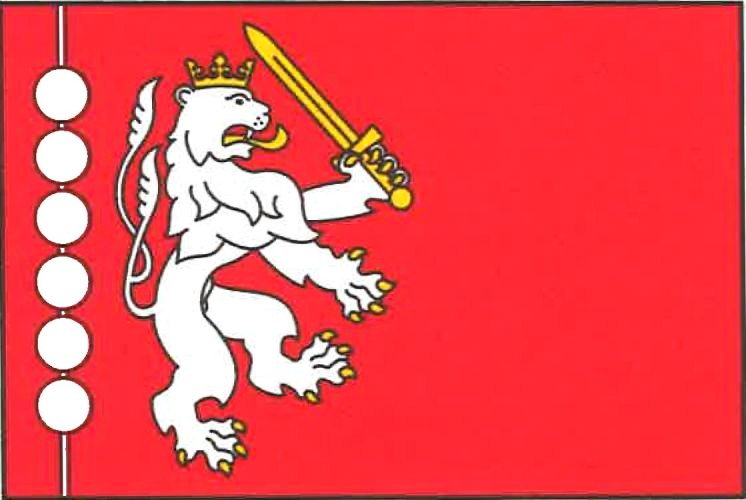
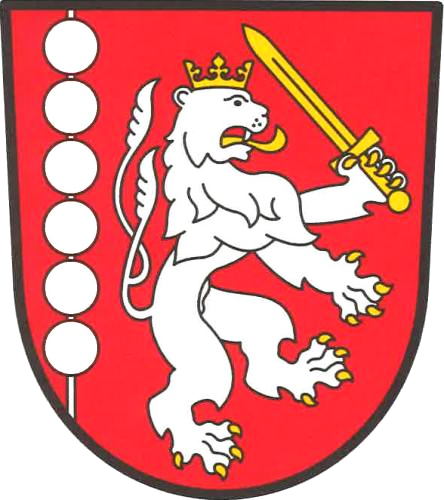
- Flag Coat of arms

- Location in the Czech Republic
- Coordinates: 50°41′15″N 15°18′12″E
- Country: Czech Republic
- Region: Liberec
- District: Jablonec nad Nisou
- First mentioned: 1352

Area
  - Total: 5.97 km^{2} (2.31 sq mi)
- Elevation: 497 m (1,631 ft)

Population (2026-01-01)
  - Total: 581
  - Density: 97.3/km^{2} (252/sq mi)
- Time zone: UTC+1 (CET)
  - Summer (DST): UTC+2 (CEST)
- Postal code: 468 24
- Website: www.drzkov.cz

Držkov (German: Drschke) is a municipality and village in Jablonec nad Nisou District in the Liberec Region of the Czech Republic. It has about 600 inhabitants.

== Demographics ==
Historical population
Year	Pop.	±%
1869	816	—
1880	842	+3.2%
1890	943	+12.0%
1900	973	+3.2%
1910	1,194	+22.7%
1921	926	−22.4%
1930	986	+6.5%
1950	705	−28.5%
1961	728	+3.3%
1970	653	−10.3%
1980	538	−17.6%
1991	530	−1.5%
2001	572	+7.9%
2011	534	−6.6%
2021	569	+6.6%
Source: Censuses

== Notable people ==
- Miroslav Havel (1922–2008), glassmaker and designer
