= Mannix Flynn =

Irish independent politician

Cllr Gerard Mannix Flynn
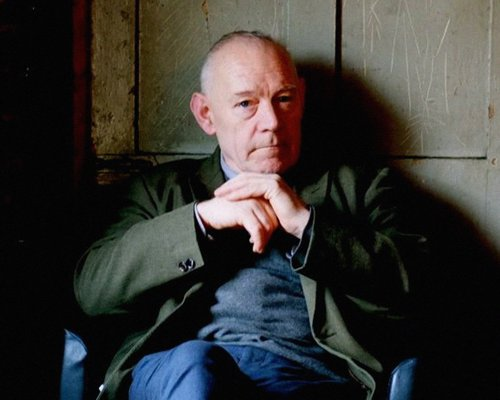

Dublin City Councillor
- Incumbent
- Assumed office 24 May 2009
- Constituency: South East Inner City

Personal details
- Born: Gerard Mannix Flynn; 4 May 1957 (age 69) Dublin, Ireland
- Party: Independent
- Website: mannixflynn.com

Gerard Mannix Flynn (born 4 May 1957) is an Irish artist, playwright and an independent politician. He has served on Dublin City Council since May 2009.

== Early life ==
He was sent to St Joseph's Industrial School in Letterfrack aged eleven for eighteen months. He was subjected to sexual and physical abuse there. He also spent time in Marlborough House Detention Centre, Daingean, County Offaly, St Patrick's Institution and was given 5 years at 15 years of age and sent to Mountjoy Prison.

== Career ==
=== Artist ===
He published the novel Nothing To Say in 1983. It was subsequently translated into German, Italian, and Polish. He founded his arts company, Farcry Productions, in 2004, which produces visual art, performance and installation work around taboo issues such as child sexual abuse, violence, and addiction.

In 2004, James X performed by Flynn won the Irish Times Theatre Award. An earlier version of this play titled Talking to the Wall had previously won the Edinburgh Fringe award.

He appeared in the films Cal and When the Sky Falls, Excalibur and worked as an actor in Scotland, London, Austria, and Dublin for 20 years.

A 2019 documentary by Flynn, Land Without God, about the effects of clerical abuse on Flynn and his family, received special mention for the Dublin Human Rights Film Award at the Dublin International Film Festival.

=== Politician ===
Flynn was first elected at the 2009 Dublin City Council election as an independent candidate representing the South-East Inner City LEA. He was re-elected to the revised Pembroke–South Dock LEA at the 2014 Dublin City Council election. At the 2014 Dublin City Council election and the 2014 Dublin City Council election, he was again elected for the South East Inner City LEA. He contested the 2011, 2016 and 2020 general elections to Dáil Éireann unsuccessfully. He stood unsuccessfully at the 2021 Dublin Bay South by-election, getting 879 first-preference votes (3.3%) and the 2026 Dublin Central by-election, getting 157 first-preference votes (0.6%).

He tabled a motion to move the Temple Bar Cultural Trust (a State company established in 1991 as a regeneration agency for Temple Bar) under the direct control of Dublin City Council. The trust was subsequently found to be in breach of corporate governance and accountability in a number of public reports.

He has expressed critical views of the way public money was spent as part of a Grafton Street regeneration project.

He supports tougher regulation around the amplification of busking on public streets, which led to his office being vandalised in February 2015. He has been involved in a number of challenges to cycle lane provision, with a High Court challenge against the Strand Road cycle lane COVID mobility trial and is a spokesperson for a group opposed to this cycle lane trial. Critics have accused Mannix of consistently voting against policies that would provide more active travel infrastructure and in favour of policies which negatively impact pedestrians and cyclists. His legal challenges to cycling provision have the potential to revert a number of cycle lanes which have been created back to servicing predominantly cars.

In 2015, he resigned from the Dublin City Council Arts SPC over what he perceived as a lack of cohesive overall policy, strategy, and vision.

In 2016, he protested against the Artane Band, due to its association with the Artane Industrial School. The band responded saying it has had no association with the former industrial school. Flynn's protest, which included him protesting on a window sill in his Dublin City Council office, was criticised by some as "attention seeking" and a "publicity stunt full stop".

In 2019 Flynn took part in a protest against plans to open the state's largest homeless shelter in his ward. Protesters marched northbound on Aungier Street blocking traffic and shouting slogans against the Peter McVerry trust for providing the services in conjunction with Dublin City Council. In 2020 Flynn took further legal action against the council, who were working in conjunction with the Peter McVerry Trust, so that he could ensure the homeless facilities would not be built in the area.

==== Electoral Record ====
Elections to the Dáil
Constituency	Election	FPv	FPv%	Result
Dublin South-East	2011 Irish general election	1,248	3.6	Not Elected
Dublin Bay South	2016 Irish general election	1,525	3.8	Not Elected
Dublin Bay South	2020 Irish general election	645	1.6	Not Elected
Dublin Bay South	2021 Dublin Bay South by-election	879	3.3	Not Elected
Dublin Bay South	2024 Irish general election	479	1.2	Not Elected
Dublin Central	2026 Dublin Central by-election	157	0.6	Not Elected

Elections to Dublin City Council
Local Electoral Area	Election	FPv	FPv%	Result
South East Inner City	2009 Dublin City Council election	1,381	14.6	Elected on 6th count
Pembroke-South Dock	2014 Dublin City Council election	1,331	9.64	Elected on 4th count
South East Inner City	2019 Dublin City Council election	548	7.99	Elected on 10th count
South East Inner City	2024 Dublin City Council election	520	7.2	Elected on 11th count
