= Charles Bacik =

Glass maker (1910–1991)

- Karel Bačík
- Born: 25 June 1910
- Died: 11 July 1991 (aged 81)
- Relatives: Ivana Bacik (granddaughter)

Charles Bacik (Czech: Karel Bačík; 25 June 1910 – 11 July 1991) was a Bohemian-Irish glass manufacturer and co-founder of the modern Waterford Glass.

== Biography ==
He was born in Nová Říše in Bohemia, then a part of the Austro-Hungarian Empire. He went on to study and graduated from Charles University in Prague, and began working in Bohemian glass manufacturing in Světlá nad Sázavou in 1935. By the time of the Communist takeover, he owned four glass factories.

During World War II he was imprisoned by the Nazis.

In 1946, as his factories were nationalised, he emigrated to Ireland. In 1947, in partnership with a Dublin gift shop owner, Bernard Fitzpatrick, he started Waterford Glass. In 1950, the company was in financial difficulties and he ceded ownership to the Irish Glass Bottle Company. He continued to work for the company as a manager until 1974 and as a board member until 1984.

He died in 1991 at Rathmore House, Fiddown, County Kilkenny, Ireland.

His granddaughter, Ivana Bacik, is an Irish politician and academic.

== Sources ==
- Brian F. Havel, Maestro of Crystal, Currach Press, 2005, biography of Miroslav Havel, a glass designer who worked with Bacik both in Czechoslovakia and Ireland.
