= Miroslav Havel =

Miroslav Havel (26 May 1922 – 5 September 2008) was the chief designer for Waterford Crystal.

Born in Držkov, Czechoslovakia, he trained as a glass craftsman in Železný Brod and in the Academy of Art and Industrial Design ("Umprum") in Prague. During his study at Umprum, he interned in a glass factory in Světlá nad Sázavou owned by Karel Bacik. Bacik, who was losing control of his business as the Communist takeover progressed, migrated to Ireland, made plans to set up a glass factory there, and in 1947 sent for Havel to supervise the technical aspects of the factory.

There had been a glassmaking factory in Waterford in the previous century, but as nothing was left of that tradition, Havel created a production process from scratch, recruited skilled craftspeople from traditional glassmaking areas of Europe, set up training and apprenticeship programmes for Irish personnel, and designed new product ranges. In these product ranges, Havel attempted to reestablish continuity with the glassmaking tradition of Waterford City (Havel visited the National Museum to make detailed drawings of their collection of original Waterford glass), while serving the needs of contemporary consumers and working within the constraints of modern factory production.
