= 2022 Labour Party leadership election (Ireland) =

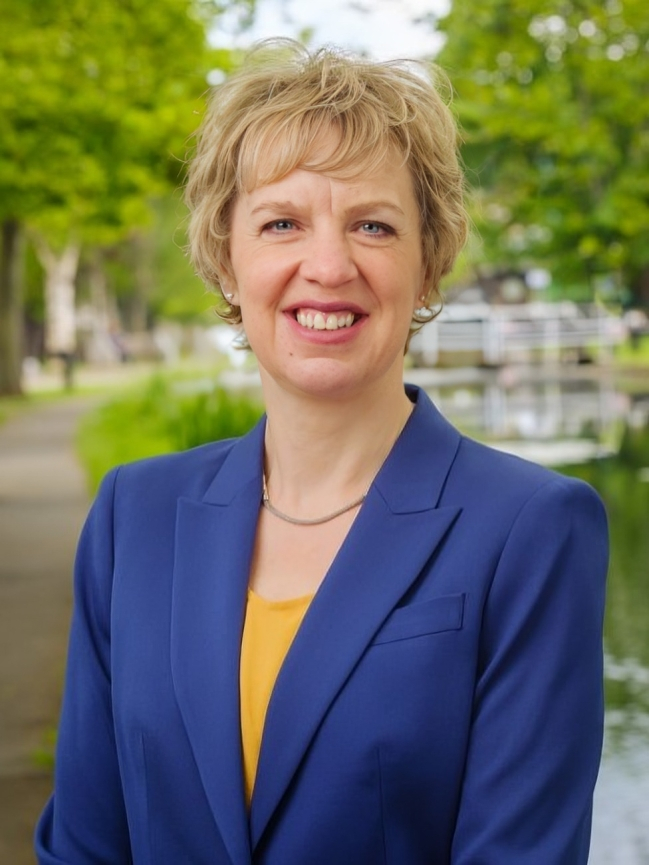
Candidate	Ivana Bacik
Popular vote	Unopposed
Leader before election
Alan Kelly
Elected Leader
Ivana Bacik

The 2022 Labour Party leadership election was a leadership election within Ireland's Labour Party that was triggered when Alan Kelly stepped down as Labour leader on 2 March 2022, citing a lack of confidence in his leadership from party colleagues as the reason.

After nominations closed on 24 March, Ivana Bacik was declared the new leader of the Labour Party after becoming the sole candidate.

== Background ==
On 2 March 2022, Alan Kelly announced his resignation as party leader, citing a lack of confidence in his leadership from party colleagues as the reason. He announced he would stay on as leader until a replacement was appointed, and would remain as a TD for Tipperary.

== Candidates ==
=== Confirmed ===
Candidate	Born	Political office	Announced
Ivana Bacik	25 May 1968 (age 57); Dublin	TD for Dublin Bay South (2021–present); Leader of the Labour Party in the Seanad (2011–21); Senator for the Dublin University constituency (2007–21)	7 March 2022

== Results ==
2022 Labour Party leadership election (Ireland)
Candidate	Nominated by
Ivana Bacik	Self-nominated
