= Eoin Hayes =

Irish politician (born 1987)

Eoin Hayes TD
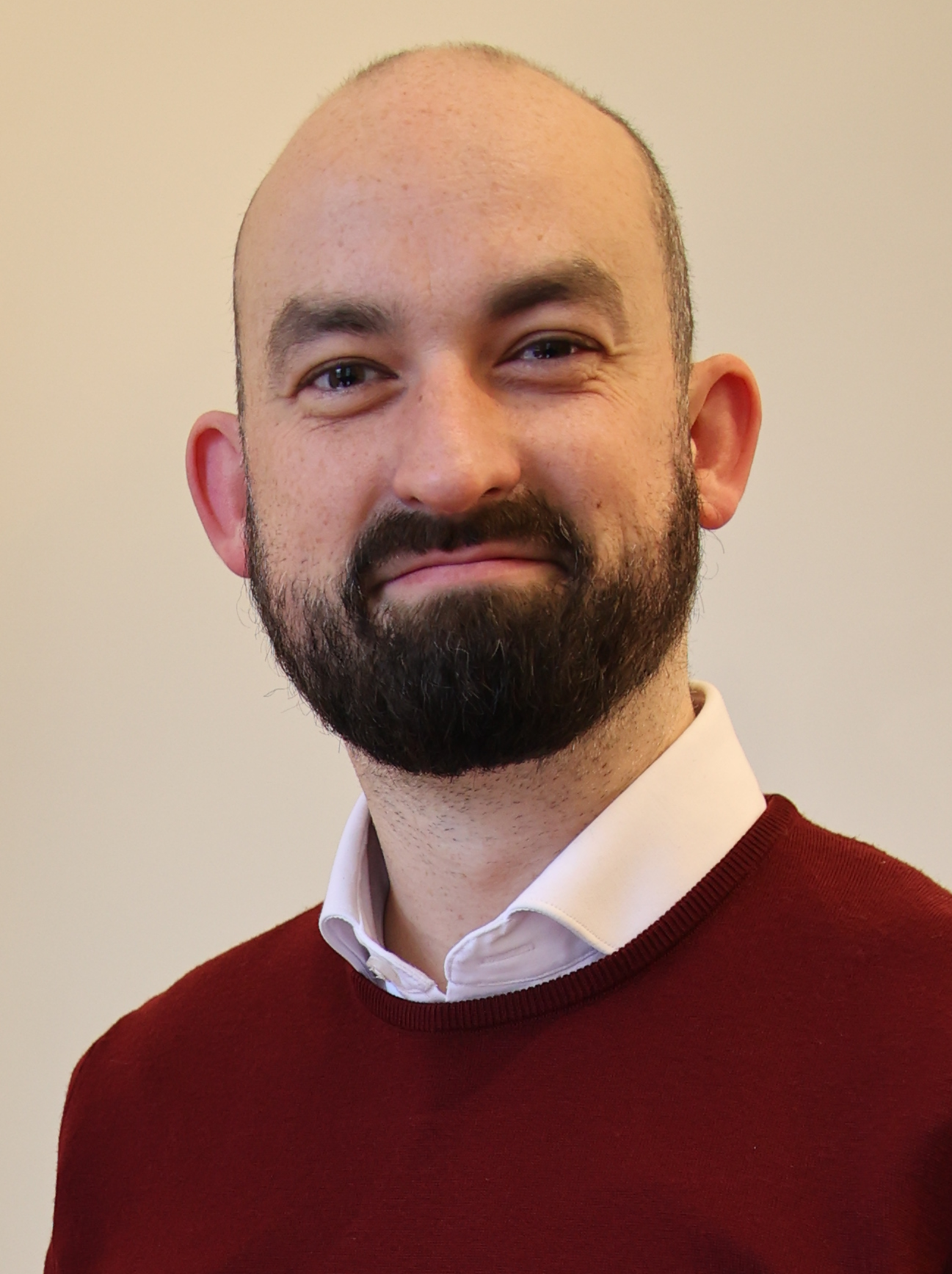
- Hayes in 2024

Teachta Dála
- Incumbent
- Assumed office November 2024
- Constituency: Dublin Bay South

Personal details
- Born: 15 October 1987 (age 38) Limerick, Ireland
- Party: Social Democrats
- Other political affiliations: Independent (Dec. 2024 – Jul. 2025)
- Education: University College Cork; London Business School

Eoin Hayes (born 15 October 1987) is an Irish Social Democrats politician, who has been a Teachta Dála (TD) for the Dublin Bay South constituency since the 2024 general election. Hayes served as a member of Dublin City Council from June 2024 until his election to the Dáil. He was indefinitely suspended from the Social Democrats parliamentary party almost immediately after the election following a controversy over holding shares in Palantir Technologies. He sat as an independent politician during the first session of the 34th Dáil, but was readmitted to the Social Democrats in July 2025.

== Early life and education ==
Hayes was born in Limerick, Ireland. At age six, he moved to Williamsport, Pennsylvania with his family. They returned to Limerick when Hayes was 14, and he completed his Leaving Certificate at Castletroy College.

He studied chemical engineering at University College Cork, after which he completed an MSc in management at London Business School of the University of London.

== Business career ==
Hayes was an intern at Google in 2011 and worked in management consulting in New York City with a boutique firm, the Alexander Group, in 2013. From 2015 to 2017, he worked for the software company Palantir Technologies.

On returning to Dublin in 2017, Hayes founded a consulting firm, Cantillon Labs, which he has led since.

== Political career ==
Hayes was elected as president of the Students' Union at University College Cork in 2009. He was active in protesting against the re-introduction of student fees by the Irish government. He was also active in opposing additional fees on students, including printing fees and graduation fees.

In 2012, he campaigned for and was employed by Barack Obama's presidential re-election campaign as a political deputy in the data team at their Chicago headquarters.

At the 2024 Dublin City Council election, he was elected as a Social Democrats candidate for the local electoral area of Kimmage–Rathmines.

In July 2024, the Social Democrats selected Hayes as their candidate in the constituency of Dublin Bay South. At the 2024 general election, he was elected to the Dáil, defeating Chris Andrews to win the fourth and final seat in the constituency.

In September 2025, Hayes apologised for a Halloween costume he wore in 2009 of then US President Barack Obama in which he wore brown make-up.

=== Suspension from the Social Democrats ===
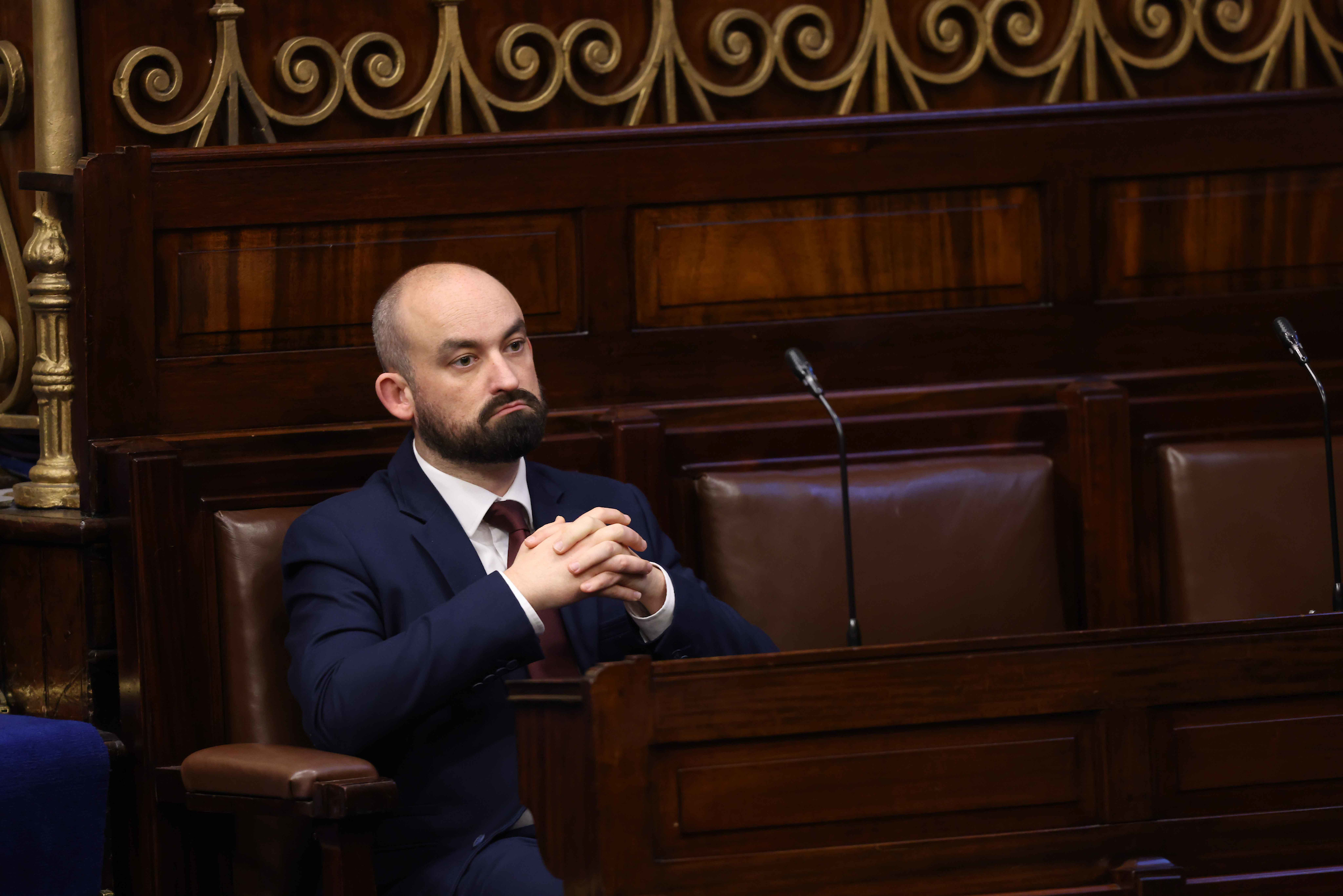
Hayes sitting alone on his first day in the Dáil following the controversy surrounding his sale of shares of Palantir Technologies.

During his employment with Palantir Technologies, Hayes received 7,000 shares in the company, which supplies artificial intelligence tools to the Israel Defense Forces. At a press conference on 10 December 2024, Hayes claimed that he had disposed of his Palantir shares before entering electoral politics. However, he acknowledged later that day that he had sold the shares for €199,000 on 26 July 2024, more than a month after his election to Dublin City Council. In a statement, Hayes said: "I unreservedly apologise for providing incorrect information and I am now correcting the record".

The Social Democrats suspended Hayes from the parliamentary party with immediate effect, with deputy leader Cian O'Callaghan stating: "This is a serious matter. It is imperative that the media, who hold politicians to account on behalf of the public, can rely on the information they receive from elected representatives." Hayes sat as an independent when the 34th Dáil met for the first time on 18 December.

Hayes' admission also drew criticism from other parties. Sinn Féin director of elections Matt Carthy said: "Had this information been in the public domain [prior to the 2024 general election], it is my very firm belief that Eoin Hayes would not be a TD, and that [Sinn Féin candidate] Chris Andrews would have been re-elected". Claiming that Hayes had "won his seat on false pretences", Carthy called for his resignation. People Before Profit–Solidarity leader Richard Boyd Barrett accused Hayes of "profiting from genocide".

On 13 December, the Social Democrats' head office near the Dáil was evacuated after staff reported receiving a suspicious package addressed to Hayes. A number of companies located in the same building were also evacuated. However, an investigation by the army's bomb disposal unit found that the package contained no explosive material, and the Gardaí determined that the threat was not credible.

On 11 February 2025 deputy leader Cian O'Callaghan confirmed that the national executive of the Social Democrats had completed an investigation into the matter, and chose to "endorse" the parliamentary party's decision to suspend Hayes from the parliamentary party indefinitely. He was not expelled from the party and remains a member of the Social Democrats, with no timeline to return to the parliamentary party. When asked if this meant he was still a Social Democrat TD, O'Callaghan replied: "When we made a decision back in December to suspend his membership from the parliamentary party, he wasn't a Social Democrat TD from that period onwards."

On 9 April 2025 it was revealed that the previous day Cian O'Callaghan had written to the clerk of the Dáil saying: "There were 11 Social Democrat TDs elected to this Dáil and, not withstanding internal disciplinary measures, there remain 11 Social Democrat TDs in our party.". This was for the purposes of the party getting to chair an additional Oireachtas committee as they are apportioned according to party/group size. Without counting Hayes, they would have only received a single committee chair. O'Callaghan also clarified that there had been "no change" to his status within the party and that measures announced in February were still in place.

Hayes's suspension from the party was lifted on 25 July 2025. He donated $51,000 to three charities working in Gaza, with that money representing the uplift in share price from 7 October 2023 to 26 July 2024. Hayes apologised for not divesting sooner and for providing incorrect information to the media and the party. Cian O'Callaghan believed "he should be given a second chance".

Dáil	Election	Deputy (Party)	Deputy (Party)	Deputy (Party)	Deputy (Party)
32nd	2016	Eamon Ryan (GP)	Jim O'Callaghan (FF)	Kate O'Connell (FG)	Eoghan Murphy (FG)
33rd	2020	Eamon Ryan (GP)	Jim O'Callaghan (FF)	Chris Andrews (SF)	Eoghan Murphy (FG)
33rd	2021 by-election	Eamon Ryan (GP)	Jim O'Callaghan (FF)	Chris Andrews (SF)	Ivana Bacik (Lab)
34th	2024	James Geoghegan (FG)	Jim O'Callaghan (FF)	Eoin Hayes (SD)	Ivana Bacik (Lab)
