= Dublin Bay South =

Dáil constituency (2016–present)

- Dáil constituency
- Location of Dublin Bay South within County Dublin
- Interactive map of constituency boundaries since the 2024 general election
- Major settlements: Ballsbridge; Donnybrook; Dublin (South inner city); Harold's Cross; Portobello; Ranelagh; Rathfarnham; Rathmines; Ringsend; Sandymount; Terenure

Current constituency
- Created: 2016
- Seats: 4
- TDs: Ivana Bacik (Lab); James Geoghegan (FG); Eoin Hayes (SD); Jim O'Callaghan (FF)
- Local government area: Dublin City
- Created from: Dublin South-East; Dublin South-Central (part)
- EP constituency: Dublin

Dublin Bay South is a parliamentary constituency that has been represented in Dáil Éireann, the lower house of the Irish parliament or Oireachtas, since the 2016 general election. The constituency elects four deputies (Teachtaí Dála, commonly known as TDs) on the system of proportional representation by means of the single transferable vote (PR-STV).

== History and boundaries ==
It was established by the Electoral (Amendment) (Dáil Constituencies) Act 2013. The constituency incorporates the entirety of the former Dublin South-East constituency with the addition of territory from Dublin South-Central, centred on Terenure and Harold's Cross. The constituency was named Dublin Bay South for "reasons of symmetry", with the new Dublin Bay North constituency.

The Constituency Review Report 2023 of the Electoral Commission recommended that at the next general election Dublin Bay South be altered by the transfer of territory to Dublin South-Central.

The Electoral (Amendment) Act 2023 defines the constituency as:

"In the city of Dublin, the electoral divisions of:

Mansion House A, Mansion House B, Pembroke East A, Pembroke East B, Pembroke East C, Pembroke East D, Pembroke East E, Pembroke West A, Pembroke West B, Pembroke West C, Rathfarnham, Rathmines East A, Rathmines East B, Rathmines East C, Rathmines East D, Rathmines West A, Rathmines West B, Rathmines West C, Rathmines West D, Rathmines West E, Rathmines West F, Royal Exchange A, Royal Exchange B, St. Kevin's, South Dock, Terenure A, Terenure B, Terenure C, Terenure D, Wood Quay A, Wood Quay B."

=== Voting patterns ===
In 2021, Dublin Bay South was characterised as a "Fine Gael heartland" by some of the Irish national media, noting the area (as Dublin South-East) was once the seat of Fine Gael leaders John A. Costello and Garret FitzGerald and their historical performance in the area. However, it has also been the seat of party leaders Ruairi Quinn and Ivana Bacik of the Labour Party, Michael McDowell of the Progressive Democrats, and John Gormley and Eamon Ryan of the Green Party. Dublin Bay South has been called "one of the most liberal constituencies in the country" as well as "one of the wealthiest". As Dublin South-East, the area had the highest vote against the introduction of the Eighth Amendment in 1983, and in the 2018 referendum it had the highest vote in favour of repealing it. It has been noted that between the Labour Party, the Green Party, the Social Democrats and Democratic Left, centre-left parties have won at least 29% of the vote in every election in the area between 1981 and 2021.

The constituency has been marked by the consistently low-voter turnout, normally coming in at 54%; this can be partially attributed to the high rate of residential turnover in the areas of Rathmines and Ranelagh.

As of 2021, half of adults in the constituency have been described as professionals, 57% of individuals have third-level qualifications, and 44% live in privately rented apartments.

== TDs ==
Teachtaí Dála (TDs) for Dublin Bay South 2016–
Key to parties: FF = Fianna Fáil; FG = Fine Gael; GP = Green; Lab = Labour; SF = Sinn Féin; SD = Social Democrats
Dáil	Election	Deputy (Party)	Deputy (Party)	Deputy (Party)	Deputy (Party)
32nd	2016	Eamon Ryan (GP)	Jim O'Callaghan (FF)	Kate O'Connell (FG)	Eoghan Murphy (FG)
33rd	2020	Eamon Ryan (GP)	Jim O'Callaghan (FF)	Chris Andrews (SF)	Eoghan Murphy (FG)
33rd	2021 by-election	Eamon Ryan (GP)	Jim O'Callaghan (FF)	Chris Andrews (SF)	Ivana Bacik (Lab)
34th	2024	James Geoghegan (FG)	Jim O'Callaghan (FF)	Eoin Hayes (SD)	Ivana Bacik (Lab)

Note: The columns in this table are used only for presentational purposes, and no significance should be attached to the order of columns. For details of the order in which seats were won at each election, see the detailed results of that election.

== Elections ==
*: Outgoing TD

=== 2024 general election ===
2024 general election: Dublin Bay South
Party	Candidate	FPv%	Count											
Party	Candidate	FPv%	1	2	3	4	5	6	7	8	9	10	11	12
Fine Gael	James Geoghegan	15.2	6,060	6,069	6,118	6,171	6,173	6,464	6,673	7,060	10,650			
Labour	Ivana Bacik	14.3	5,684	5,685	5,763	5,795	5,940	6,250	6,359	7,945	8,542			
Fianna Fáil	Jim O'Callaghan	13.9	5,536	5,541	5,630	5,779	5,792	6,191	6,562	6,723	7,381	9,751		
Sinn Féin	Chris Andrews	12.2	4,875	4,884	4,993	5,166	5,518	5,584	5,960	6,091	6,139	6,163	6,258	6,294
Fine Gael	Emma Blain	10.3	4,102	4,106	4,134	4,190	4,193	4,544	4,711	5,177				
Social Democrats	Eoin Hayes	9.1	3,615	3,619	3,676	3,702	4,361	4,507	4,724	5,535	5,673	5,972	6,754	7,017
Green	Hazel Chu	8.2	3,250	3,258	3,297	3,332	3,438	3,609	3,680					
Independent	Kate O'Connell	4.4	1,772	1,788	1,849	1,905	1,956							
Independent	Nick Delehanty	3.9	1,542	1,600	1,776	2,108	2,150	2,272						
PBP–Solidarity	Brigid Purcell (Note: Purcell is a member of People Before Profit.)	3.4	1,339	1,346	1,372	1,413								
Aontú	Alan Healy	2.4	956	999	1,107									
Independent	Mannix Flynn	1.2	479	491										
Independent	Peter Dooley	0.9	358	383										
The Irish People	Lauralee Doyle	0.4	150											
Independent	Daniel Pocock	0.1	27											
Independent	John Keigher	0.1	23											
Independent	David Hennessy	0.1	16											
Electorate: 83,689 Valid: 39,784 Spoilt: 195 Quota: 7,957 Turnout: 47.8%

=== 2021 by-election ===
A by-election took place on 8 July 2021, to fill the vacancy left by the resignation of Eoghan Murphy.

2021 by-election: Dublin Bay South
Party	Candidate	FPv%	Count								
Party	Candidate	FPv%	1	2	3	4	5	6	7	8	9
Labour	Ivana Bacik	30.2	8,131	8,134	8,146	8,188	8,308	8,380	8,851	9,474	13,382
Fine Gael	James Geoghegan	26.2	7,052	7,054	7,093	7,134	7,147	7,354	7,400	8,265	9,235
Sinn Féin	Lynn Boylan	15.8	4,245	4,245	4,246	4,357	4,695	4,779	4,985	5,237	
Green	Claire Byrne	8.0	2,157	2,164	2,170	2,197	2,264	2,360	2,610	2,985	
Fianna Fáil	Deirdre Conroy	4.6	1,247	1,250	1,256	1,278	1,288	1,380	1,402		
Independent	Mannix Flynn	3.3	879	882	894	975	1,003	1,120	1,181		
Social Democrats	Sarah Durcan	3.2	849	852	854	886	1,077	1,111			
PBP–Solidarity	Brigid Purcell (Note: Purcell is a member of People Before Profit.)	2.8	759	762	768	818					
Aontú	Mairéad Tóibín	2.8	740	745	798	940	958				
Independent	Peter Dooley	1.0	261	266	271						
National Party	Justin Barrett	0.7	183	186	194						
Independent	Dolores Cahill	0.6	169	171	179						
Renua	Jacqui Gilbourne	0.6	164	166							
Independent	John Keigher	0.1	23								
Independent	Colm O'Keeffe	0.1	23								
Electorate: 77,924 Valid: 26,882 Spoilt: 162 Quota: 13,442 Turnout: 27,044 (34.7%)

=== 2020 general election ===
2020 general election: Dublin Bay South
Party	Candidate	FPv%	Count							
Party	Candidate	FPv%	1	2	3	4	5	6	7	8
Green	Eamon Ryan	22.4	8,888							
Sinn Féin	Chris Andrews	16.1	6,361	6,412	6,421	6,513	6,658	6,715	7,837	8,797
Fine Gael	Eoghan Murphy	16.0	6,346	6,464	6,473	6,489	6,544	6,638	6,767	7,602
Fianna Fáil	Jim O'Callaghan	13.8	5,474	5,587	5,597	5,622	5,718	5,977	6,180	7,158
Fine Gael	Kate O'Connell	11.7	4,624	4,785	4,795	4,810	4,869	4,891	5,127	6,270
Labour	Kevin Humphreys	7.9	3,121	3,355	3,375	3,406	3,516	3,589	4,971	
Social Democrats	Sarah Durcan	4.5	1,801	1,988	2,021	2,081	2,158	2,210		
Solidarity–PBP	Annette Mooney (Note: Mooney was a member of People Before Profit.)	2.5	1,002	1,049	1,062	1,145	1,243	1,282		
Independent	Mannix Flynn	1.6	645	675	690	753				
Renua	Jacqui Gilborne	1.6	634	643	656	802	847			
Independent	Peter Dooley	0.7	281	288	317					
Irish Freedom	Ben Scallan	0.6	245	248	255					
Independent	Norma Burke	0.3	110	116						
Independent	John Keigher	0.1	48	50						
Independent	Sean O'Leary	0.0	11	12						
Electorate: 76,514 Valid: 39,591 Spoilt: 268 (0.7%) Quota: 7,919 Turnout: 39,759 (52.0%)

=== 2016 general election ===
2016 general election: Dublin Bay South
Party	Candidate	FPv%	Count							
Party	Candidate	FPv%	1	2	3	4	5	6	7	8
Fine Gael	Eoghan Murphy	16.5	6,567	6,595	6,661	6,693	6,873	7,860	8,023	
Fine Gael	Kate O'Connell	13.6	5,399	5,416	5,483	5,527	5,773	6,324	6,446	6,547
Fianna Fáil	Jim O'Callaghan	11.5	4,575	4,596	4,674	4,744	4,949	5,989	6,678	6,921
Green	Eamon Ryan	11.4	4,529	4,631	4,929	5,277	6,605	7,560	8,788	
Renua	Lucinda Creighton	10.7	4,229	4,252	4,385	4,545	4,820			
Labour	Kevin Humphreys	10.6	4,205	4,227	4,378	4,480	4,992	5,391	5,973	6,221
Sinn Féin	Chris Andrews	9.5	3,774	3,796	3,957	4,511	4,888	5,197		
Social Democrats	Glenna Lynch	6.7	2,652	2,694	2,949	3,527				
AAA–PBP	Annette Mooney	4.4	1,728	1,819	2,149					
Independent	Mannix Flynn	3.8	1,525	1,648						
Independent	Alan MacStiofain	0.6	235							
Independent	Eoin Tierney	0.4	151							
Independent	William DJ Gorman	0.2	97							
Independent	John Keigher	0.1	37							
Electorate: 73,066 Valid: 39,703 Spoilt: 313 (0.8%) Quota: 7,941 Turnout: 40,016 (54.8%)

== See also ==
- Elections in the Republic of Ireland
- Politics of the Republic of Ireland
- List of Dáil by-elections
- List of political parties in the Republic of Ireland
