= Eoghan Murphy =

Irish former politician (born 1982)

- Murphy in 2018

Minister for Housing, Planning and Local Government
- In office 14 June 2017 – 27 June 2020
- Taoiseach: Leo Varadkar
- Preceded by: Simon Coveney
- Succeeded by: Darragh O'Brien

Minister of State
- 2016–2017: Finance
- 2016–2017: Public Expenditure and Reform

Teachta Dála
- In office February 2016 – 27 April 2021
- Constituency: Dublin Bay South
- In office February 2011 – February 2016
- Constituency: Dublin South-East

Personal details
- Born: 23 April 1982 (age 44) Sandymount, Dublin, Ireland
- Party: Fine Gael
- Relatives: Killian Scott (brother)
- Education: University College Dublin; King's College London

Eoghan Murphy (born 23 April 1982) is an Irish former Fine Gael politician, who served as a Teachta Dála (TD) from 2011 to 2021, representing the Dublin Bay South constituency. He served as Minister for Housing, Planning and Local Government from 2017 to 2020 and as Minister of State for Financial Services from 2016 to 2017.

Since 2021, he served as Head of Mission on election observation missions to Armenia, Uzbekistan, Italy, Kazakhstan, Azerbaijan, Georgia, Romania, Hungary and Serbia on behalf of the Organisation for Security and Cooperation (OSCE).

In 2024, Murphy published a memoir about his political career, 'Running From Office: Confessions of Ambition and Failure in Politics'. Published by Eriu, an imprint of BonnierBooksUK, it was a number 1 bestseller in Ireland, topping non-fiction paperback sales. Broadcaster and writer Rory Stewart described it as a "wonderfully engaging, honest and witty portrait of the humiliations, idealism, nobility and banality of democratic life."

== Early life and education ==
Born in Dublin, Murphy attended primary school at Star of the Sea Sandymount and secondary school at St Michael's College. He went on to study at University College Dublin (BA, English & Philosophy), and King's College London (MA, International Relations). In 2013, he was awarded a Marshall Memorial Fellowship.

His father Henry is a retired senior counsel and author. His brothers Cillian (the actor known as Killian Scott) and Colin, a playwright and journalist, have forged successful careers in the arts.

== Career ==
=== Arms control ===
Prior to entering politics, Murphy worked in international arms control, specifically in the area of nuclear weapons disarmament. He has worked for the United Nations Institute for Disarmament Research (UNIDIR) in Geneva, Switzerland, the Department of Foreign Affairs and Trade in Dublin, and before his election to Dublin City Council, he was working as a speechwriter for the Comprehensive Nuclear-Test-Ban Treaty Organization (CTBTO) in Vienna, Austria. In a 2015 Dáil debate on Irish neutrality, Murphy supported ending the triple lock requirement for Irish military deployment to have United Nations Security Council support, on the ground that it makes Ireland subject to Russia's veto power.

=== Politics ===
Murphy stood in his first election in 2009 and topped the poll when he was elected to Dublin City Council at the 2009 local elections for the local electoral area of Pembroke–Rathmines. He was 27 at the time.

At the 2011 general election, he was elected to Dáil Éireann for the Dublin South-East constituency, vacating his seat on the council. In the 31st Dáil, he sat on the Public Accounts Committee (PAC), then regarded as the foremost Oireachtas Committee due to its special powers, and subsequently served on the Committee of Inquiry into the Banking Crisis, established to examine the causes of Ireland's property-driven banking collapse which resulted in a national bailout. When that inquiry almost collapsed Murphy, together with Senator Susan O'Keeffe, was asked by their colleagues to rescue the final report, which was published in January 2016.

In his first term he also led the Oireachtas delegation to the Parliamentary Assembly of the OSCE, serving as a short-term observer to the Russian presidential election in 2012, and as Special Co-Ordinator for the Bulgarian parliamentary elections in 2013.

In 2013, Murphy self-published "Reforming Dáil Eireann: A View from the Backbenches", a booklet containing a series of reforms which sought to strengthen the independence of parliament vis-a-vis government, implicitly criticising his own Party in government at the time: "But if the foundations of our democracy continue to be weak, whatever we build on them will be weaker.”

At the 2016 general election, Murphy topped the poll in the redrawn constituency of Dublin Bay South, winning the second seat.

When the 2016 election failed to give any one party an outright majority, Murphy was drafted in by Enda Kenny to represent Fine Gael as a part of a small team heavily involved in talks with other parties and independents on the formation of a minority government. He was subsequently appointed by Taoiseach Enda Kenny to the minority Fine Gael–Independent government as Minister of State at the Department of Finance and at the Department of Public Expenditure and Reform with responsibility for Financial Services, eGovernment and Public Procurement.

When Enda Kenny announced his resignation as President of Fine Gael and Taoiseach in early 2017, Leo Varadkar appointed Murphy to run his parliamentary party campaign. Murphy was instrumental in orchestrating Varadkar's successful election as President of Fine Gael and subsequently as Taoiseach.

Following Leo Varadkar's appointment as Taoiseach, Murphy was promoted to the cabinet, as Minister for Housing, Planning and Local Government in June 2017. On 25 September 2018, Murphy survived a motion of no confidence which had been tabled by Sinn Féin. The motion was defeated by 59 to 49 votes. In December 2019, another motion of no confidence was tabled against Murphy, this time by the Social Democrats. The motion was defeated by 59 votes to 56.

In the 2020 general election he was elected to the third seat in Dublin Bay South. After the election he continued to serve as minister during the first phase of the Covid pandemic. At the formation of a new government on 27 June 2020 he announced that he was stepping back from ministerial politics to focus on reform of his party. He resigned his seat in the Dáil in April 2021.

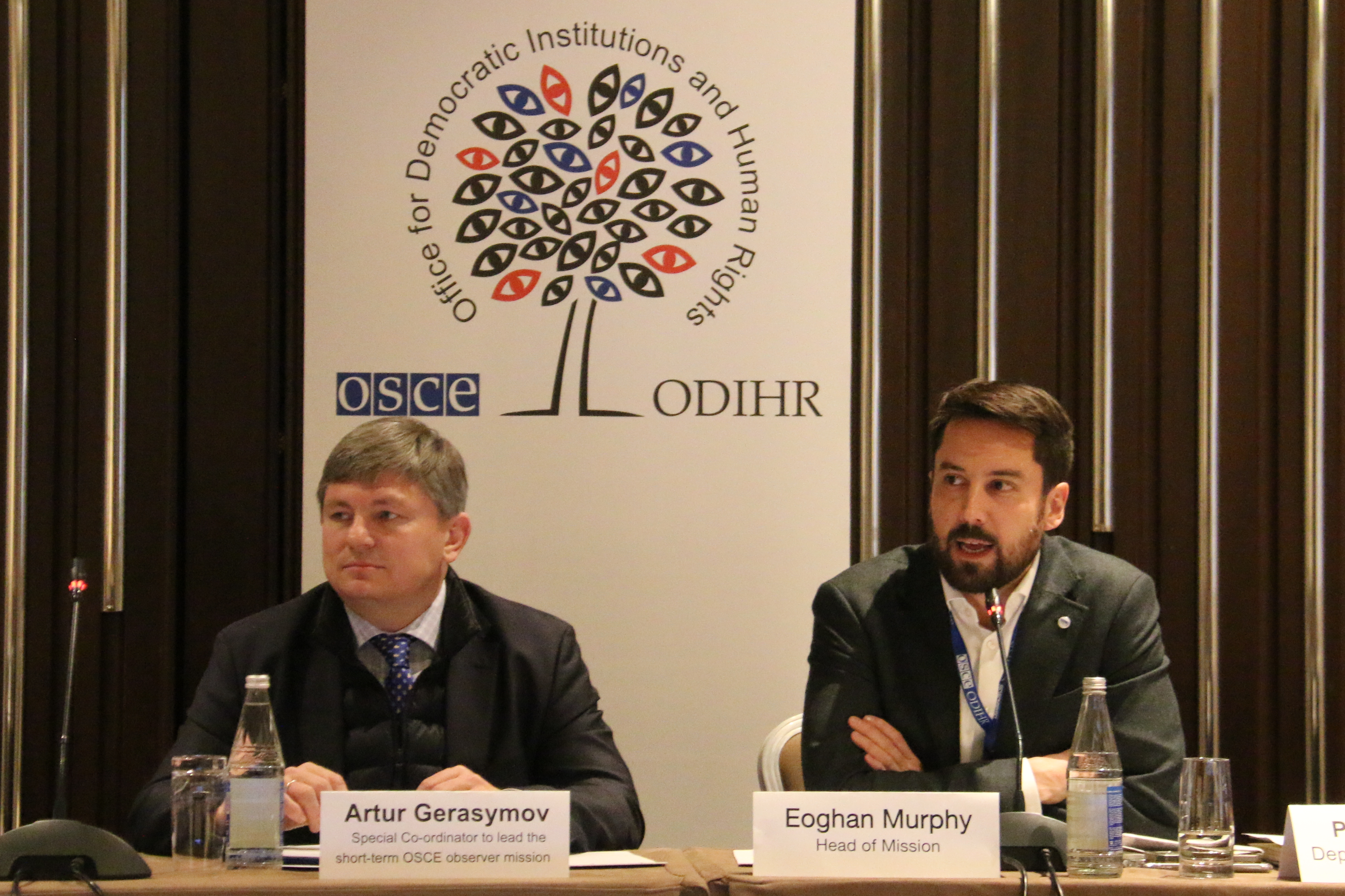
Murphy addressing observers in Baku, February 2024

=== Election observation ===
On 27 April 2021, Murphy resigned his seat in Dáil Éireann, and announced that he would return to working in international affairs. That same year he began working with the Organization for Security and Co-operation in Europe (OSCE), consulting for the election monitoring arm of the OSCE's Office for Democratic Institutions and Human Rights (ODIHR).

In May 2021, Murphy was appointed as Head of Mission to the election observation mission to the early parliamentary elections in Armenia. In September 2021, Murphy was appointed as Head of Mission to the election observation mission to the presidential election in Uzbekistan.

Murphy returned to Armenia and Uzbekistan in 2022 to follow up on recommendations his team had made to further enhance the conduct of elections in both countries and to support efforts to bring them fully in line with OSCE commitments and other international obligations and standards for democratic elections.

In recent years, Murphy has led election observation activities on behalf of the OSCE's ODIHR in Italy (parliamentary elections, September 2022), Kazakhstan (early parliamentary elections, March 2023), and Azerbaijan (early presidential election, February 2024). In September 2024 he was appointed as Head of Mission to the parliamentary elections in Georgia, to be held on 26 October.

In August 2024, Murphy announced that he had written a book about his time in politics, entitled Running From Office.

== Political views ==
Speaking in 2024, Murphy described himself as ideologically as a "Liberal" or "Libertarian", both socially and economically. Murphy stated that he was inspired to become involved in politics after learning that the Progressive Democrats were able to achieve an influence in Irish politics far greater than their number of elected representatives would have suggested. Murphy also stated that Nick Clegg and the British Liberal Democrats were another source of inspiration early in his career.

Political offices
Preceded by Simon Harris	Minister of State for Financial Services, eGovernment and Public Procurement; 2016–2017	Succeeded by Patrick O'Donovan
Preceded by Simon Coveney as Minister for Housing, Planning, Community and Local Government	Minister for Housing, Planning and Local Government; 2017–2020	Succeeded by Darragh O'Brien as Minister for Housing, Local Government and Heritage

Dáil	Election	Deputy (Party)	Deputy (Party)	Deputy (Party)	Deputy (Party)
13th	1948	John A. Costello (FG)	Seán MacEntee (FF)	Noël Browne (CnaP)	3 seats 1948–1981
14th	1951	John A. Costello (FG)	Seán MacEntee (FF)	Noël Browne (Ind.)	3 seats 1948–1981
15th	1954	John A. Costello (FG)	Seán MacEntee (FF)	John O'Donovan (FG)	3 seats 1948–1981
16th	1957	John A. Costello (FG)	Seán MacEntee (FF)	Noël Browne (Ind.)	3 seats 1948–1981
17th	1961	John A. Costello (FG)	Seán MacEntee (FF)	Noël Browne (NPD)	3 seats 1948–1981
18th	1965	John A. Costello (FG)	Seán MacEntee (FF)	Seán Moore (FF)	3 seats 1948–1981
19th	1969	Garret FitzGerald (FG)	Noël Browne (Lab)	Seán Moore (FF)	3 seats 1948–1981
20th	1973	Garret FitzGerald (FG)	Fergus O'Brien (FG)	Seán Moore (FF)	3 seats 1948–1981
21st	1977	Garret FitzGerald (FG)	Ruairi Quinn (Lab)	Seán Moore (FF)	3 seats 1948–1981
22nd	1981	Garret FitzGerald (FG)	Gerard Brady (FF)	Seán Moore (FF)	Richie Ryan (FG)
23rd	1982 (Feb)	Garret FitzGerald (FG)	Gerard Brady (FF)	Ruairi Quinn (Lab)	Alexis FitzGerald Jnr (FG)
24th	1982 (Nov)	Garret FitzGerald (FG)	Gerard Brady (FF)	Ruairi Quinn (Lab)	Joe Doyle (FG)
25th	1987	Garret FitzGerald (FG)	Gerard Brady (FF)	Ruairi Quinn (Lab)	Michael McDowell (PDs)
26th	1989	Garret FitzGerald (FG)	Gerard Brady (FF)	Ruairi Quinn (Lab)	Joe Doyle (FG)
27th	1992	Frances Fitzgerald (FG)	Eoin Ryan Jnr (FF)	Ruairi Quinn (Lab)	Michael McDowell (PDs)
28th	1997	Frances Fitzgerald (FG)	Eoin Ryan Jnr (FF)	Ruairi Quinn (Lab)	John Gormley (GP)
29th	2002	Michael McDowell (PDs)	Eoin Ryan Jnr (FF)	Ruairi Quinn (Lab)	John Gormley (GP)
30th	2007	Lucinda Creighton (FG)	Chris Andrews (FF)	Ruairi Quinn (Lab)	John Gormley (GP)
31st	2011	Lucinda Creighton (FG)	Eoghan Murphy (FG)	Ruairi Quinn (Lab)	Kevin Humphreys (Lab)
32nd	2016	Constituency abolished. See Dublin Bay South.			

Dáil	Election	Deputy (Party)	Deputy (Party)	Deputy (Party)	Deputy (Party)
32nd	2016	Eamon Ryan (GP)	Jim O'Callaghan (FF)	Kate O'Connell (FG)	Eoghan Murphy (FG)
33rd	2020	Eamon Ryan (GP)	Jim O'Callaghan (FF)	Chris Andrews (SF)	Eoghan Murphy (FG)
33rd	2021 by-election	Eamon Ryan (GP)	Jim O'Callaghan (FF)	Chris Andrews (SF)	Ivana Bacik (Lab)
34th	2024	James Geoghegan (FG)	Jim O'Callaghan (FF)	Eoin Hayes (SD)	Ivana Bacik (Lab)
