= Dublin South-Central =

Dáil constituency (1948–present)

- Dáil constituency
- Location of Dublin South-Central within County Dublin
- Interactive map of constituency boundaries since the 2024 general election
- Major settlements: Ballyfermot; Crumlin; Drimnagh; Harold's Cross (west); Inchicore; Kimmage; Terenure (west); Walkinstown

Current constituency
- Created: 1948
- Seats: 5 (1948–1969); 4 (1969–1977); 3 (1977–1981); 5 (1981–1992); 4 (1992–2002); 5 (2002–2016); 4 (2016–)
- TDs: Catherine Ardagh (FF); Jen Cummins (SD); Máire Devine (SF); Aengus Ó Snodaigh (SF)
- Local government area: Dublin City
- EP constituency: Dublin

Dublin South-Central is a parliamentary constituency in Dublin City represented in Dáil Éireann, the lower house of the Irish parliament or Oireachtas. The constituency elects four deputies (Teachtaí Dála, commonly known as TDs) on the system of proportional representation by means of the single transferable vote (PR-STV).

== Constituency profile ==
The largest employers in the area are the Guinness Brewery and St. James's Hospital. Dubbed the "People's Republic of Dublin South-Central", the constituency is one of the country's most left-wing, with all of the TDs elected in 2020 being from centre-left or left-wing parties. Both Labour Party TDs elected in 2011 had previously been members of other left-wing parties: Eric Byrne was a former member of the Workers' Party and Democratic Left, and Michael Conaghan had stood in a number of elections for Jim Kemmy's Democratic Socialist Party.

== History and boundaries ==
A constituency of this name was created by the Electoral (Amendment) Act 1947 containing the Mansion House, Merchants' Quay, Royal Exchange, St. Kevin's, South Dock, Usher's and Wood Quay wards of Dublin. Its boundaries changed considerably over the years, generally moving to the west within the city.

It is now located near the centre of Dublin city. The constituency comprises Ballyfermot, Bluebell, Chapelizod, Crumlin, Drimnagh, Dolphin's Barn, Inchicore, the Liberties, Kimmage and Walkinstown.

The Electoral (Amendment) Act 2023 defines the constituency as:

"In the city of Dublin, the electoral divisions of:

Carna, Chapelizod, Cherry-Orchard A, Cherry-Orchard C, Crumlin A, Crumlin B, Crumlin C, Crumlin D, Crumlin E, Crumlin F, Decies, Drumfinn, Inchicore A, Inchicore B, Kilmainham A, Kilmainham B, Kilmainham C, Kimmage A, Kimmage B, Kimmage C, Kimmage D, Kimmage E, Kylemore, Merchants Quay A, Merchants Quay B, Merchants Quay C, Merchants Quay D, Merchants Quay E, Merchants Quay F, Ushers A, Ushers B, Ushers C, Ushers D, Ushers E, Ushers F, Walkinstown A, Walkinstown B, Walkinstown C;
and that part of the electoral division of Phoenix Park situated south of a line drawn along Chapelizod Road, Conyngham Road and Parkgate Street."

Changes to the Dublin South-Central constituency
Years	TDs	Boundaries	Notes
1948–1961	3	In the county borough of Dublin, the Mansion House, Merchants' Quay, Royal Exchange, St. Kevin's, South Dock, Usher's and Wood Quay Wards.	Created from Dublin South.
1961–1969	3	In the county borough of Dublin, the Kilmainham, Mansion House, Merchants Quay, Royal Exchange, St. Kevin's, South Dock, Usher's and Wood Quay wards.	Transfer of Kilmainham from Dublin South-West.
1969–1977	4	In the county borough of Dublin, the Kimmage, Rathfarnham, Rathfarnham South, Rathmines West and Terenure wards; that part of Crumlin West ward which is not included in the constituency of Dublin South-West; and that part of Rathmines East ward situated west of a line drawn as follows: commencing at the intersection of the southern boundary of the ward by the eastern boundary of the former Harcourt Street-Bray railway line, thence in a northerly direction along the said eastern boundary to its junction with the southern boundary of the E.S.B. transformer station at the southern end of Cowper Drive, thence commencing in an easterly direction and proceeding along the last-mentioned boundary to its junction with the rear boundary of the houses on the eastern side of Park Drive, thence commencing in a north-easterly direction and proceeding along the last-mentioned boundary and the rear boundary of the houses on the southern side of Albany Road and on the southern and eastern sides of Merton Drive and along the eastern boundary of Merton Drive to its junction with Sandford Road, thence in a north-westerly direction along Sandford Road, Ranelagh and Ranelagh Road to its junction with the ward boundary.	Transfer of Usher's and Wood Quay and part of Royal Exchange to Dublin Central; Transfer of Mansion House, St. Kevin's, South Dock and part of Royal Exchange to Dublin South-East; Transfer of Kilmainham to Dublin South-West.
1977–1981	3	The following wards in the county borough of Dublin Kilmainham B, Mansion House A, Mansion House B, Merchant's Quay A, Merchant's Quay B, Merchant's Quay C, Merchant's Quay D, Merchant's Quay E, Merchant's Quay F, Royal Exchange A, Royal Exchange B, Saint Kevin's, Usher's A. Usher's B, Usher's C, Usher's D, Usher's E, Usher's F, Wood Quay A, Wood Quay B.	Transfer of Kilmainham B and part of Merchant's Quay from Dublin South-West; Mansion House A, Mansion House B, Saint Kevin's, and part of Royal Exchange from Dublin South-East; Usher's and Wood Quay and part of Merchant's Quay and part of Royal Exchange from Dublin Central; Transfer of Kimmage, Rathmines West, Terenure and part of Rathfarnham wards to Dublin Rathmines West; transfer of part of Rathfarnham to Dublin County Mid; transfer of part of Crumlin to Dublin Ballyfermot.
1981–1987	5	In the county borough of Dublin, the wards of Ballyfermot G, Ballyfermot H, Crumlin A, Crumlin B, Crumlin C, Crumlin D, Crumlin E, Crumlin F, Kimmage A, Kimmage B, Kimmage C, Kimmage D, Kimmage E, Merchant's Quay A, Merchant's Quay B, Merchant's Quay C, Merchant's Quay D, Merchant's Quay E, Merchant's Quay F, Rathfarnham D, Terenure A, Terenure B, Terenure C, Usher's B, Usher's C, Usher's D, Usher's E; and in County Dublin, the district electoral divisions of Terenure Number one, Terenure Number Two.	
1987–1992	5	In the county borough of Dublin, the wards of Ballyfermot G, Ballyfermot H, Crumlin A, Crumlin B, Crumlin C, Crumlin D, Crumlin E, Crumlin F, Kimmage A, Kimmage B, Kimmage C, Kimmage D, Kimmage E, Merchant's Quay A, Merchant's Quay B, Merchant's Quay C, Merchant's Quay D, Merchant's Quay E, Merchant's Quay F, Rathfarnham D, Terenure A, Terenure B, Terenure C, Usher's B, Usher's C, Usher's D, Usher's E; and in County Dublin, the district electoral divisions of Terenure Number One, Terenure Number Two, Terenure Number Three	Transfer of Terenure Number Three from Dublin South-West.
1992–1997	4	In the county borough of Dublin, the wards of Crumlin A, Crumlin B, Crumlin C, Crumlin D, Crumlin E, Crumlin F, Inchicore B, Kimmage A, Kimmage B, Kimmage C, Kimmage D, Kimmage E, Merchants Quay F, Terenure A, Terenure B, Terenure C, Terenure D, Ushers D, Ushers E, Walkinstown A, Walkinstown B, Walkinstown C; and that part of the ward of Ushers C situated south of a line drawn as follows: commencing at the point where the ward boundary departs from Grand Canal Bank nearest Basin Street Upper, thence in a north-easterly direction along Grand Canal Bank to its junction with Forbes Lane, thence in an easterly direction along Forbes Lane to its junction with the ward boundary; and in County Dublin, the district electoral divisions of Templeogue-Kimmage Manor, Templeogue-Orwell, Templeogue-Village, Terenure Cherryfield, Terenure-Greentrees; and that part of the district electoral division of Templeogue-Cypress situated north of a line drawn along the Tallaght Road.	Transfer of the south inner city area extending generally from the Grand Canal and Donore Avenue to the Liffey (Merchant's Quay A to E) to Dublin South-East.
1997–2002	4	In the city of Dublin, the electoral divisions of Crumlin A, Crumlin B, Crumlin C, Crumlin D, Crumlin E, Crumlin F, Inchicore B, Kimmage A, Kimmage B, Kimmage C, Kimmage D, Kimmage E, Merchants Quay B, Merchants Quay C, Merchants Quay D, Merchants Quay E, Merchants Quay F, Terenure A, Terenure B, Terenure C, Terenure D, Ushers B, Ushers C, Ushers D, Ushers E, Walkinstown A, Walkinstown B, Walkinstown C; and in South Dublin, the electoral divisions of Templeogue-Kimmage Manor, Templeogue-Orwell, Templeogue Village, Terenure-Cherryfield, Terenure-Greentrees; and that part of the district electoral division of Templeogue-Cypress situated north of a line drawn along the Tallaght Road.	Transfer of Merchants Quay B, Merchants Quay C, Merchants Quay D, Merchants Quay E from Dublin South-East.
2002–2007	5	In the city of Dublin, the electoral divisions of Carna, Chapelizod, Cherry-Orchard A, Cherry-Orchard C, Crumlin A, Crumlin B, Crumlin C, Crumlin D, Crumlin E, Crumlin F, Decies, Drumfinn, Inchicore A, Inchicore B, Kilmainham A, Kilmainham B, Kilmainham C, Kimmage A, Kimmage B, Kimmage C, Kimmage D, Kimmage E, Kylemore, Merchants Quay A, Merchants Quay B, Merchants Quay C, Merchants Quay D, Merchants Quay E, Merchants Quay F, Terenure A, Terenure B, Terenure C, Terenure D, Ushers A, Ushers B, Ushers C, Ushers D, Ushers E, Ushers F, Walkinstown A, Walkinstown B, Walkinstown C; and in South Dublin, the electoral divisions of Templeogue-Kimmage Manor, Terenure-Cherryfield, Terenure-Greentrees; and those parts of the electoral divisions of Clondalkin-Monastery, Clondalkin-Ballymount and Tallaght-Kilnamanagh situated east of a line drawn along the M50 Western Parkway.	Transfer of Ballyfermot, Inchicore and Kilmainham area from Dublin Central; transfer from Dublin South-East of population from South-East to complete a boundary between the constituencies running from the Liffey at Winetavern Street; swop of population with South-West to secure a western boundary bounded largely by the M50, Greenhills Road and Templeville Road.
2007–2016	4	In the city of Dublin, the electoral divisions of Carna, Chapelizod, Cherry-Orchard A, Cherry-Orchard C, Crumlin A, Crumlin B, Crumlin C, Crumlin D, Crumlin E, Crumlin F, Decies, Drumfinn, Inchicore A, Inchicore B, Kilmainham A, Kilmainham B, Kilmainham C, Kimmage A, Kimmage B, Kimmage C, Kimmage D, Kimmage E, Kylemore, Merchants Quay A, Merchants Quay B, Merchants Quay C, Merchants Quay D, Merchants Quay E, Merchants Quay F, Terenure A, Terenure B, Terenure C, Terenure D, Ushers A, Ushers B, Ushers C, Ushers D, Ushers E, Ushers F, Walkinstown A, Walkinstown B, Walkinstown C; and that part of the electoral division of Phoenix Park situated south of a line drawn along Chapelizod Road, Conyngham Road and Parkgate Street; and in South Dublin, the electoral divisions of Templeogue-Kimmage Manor, Terenure-Cherryfield, Terenure-Greentrees; and those parts of the electoral divisions of Clondalkin-Monastery, Clondalkin-Ballymount and Tallaght-Kilnamanagh situated east of a line drawn along the M50 Western Parkway.	Transfer of south part of Phoenix Park ED from Dublin Central.
2016–2024	4	In the city of Dublin, the electoral divisions of Carna, Chapelizod, Cherry-Orchard A, Cherry-Orchard C, Crumlin A, Crumlin B, Crumlin C, Crumlin D, Crumlin E, Crumlin F, Decies, Drumfinn, Inchicore A, Inchicore B, Kilmainham A, Kilmainham B, Kilmainham C, Kimmage A, Kimmage B, Kimmage D, Kimmage E, Kylemore, Merchants Quay A, Merchants Quay B, Merchants Quay C, Merchants Quay D, Merchants Quay E, Merchants Quay F, Ushers A, Ushers B, Ushers C, Ushers D, Ushers E, Ushers F, Walkinstown A, Walkinstown B, Walkinstown C; and that part of the electoral division of Phoenix Park situated south of a line drawn along Chapelizod Road, Conyngham Road and Parkgate Street; and in South Dublin, the electoral divisions of Templeogue-Kimmage Manor, Terenure-Cherryfield, Terenure-Greentrees; and those parts of the electoral divisions of Clondalkin-Ballymount, Clondalkin-Monastery and Tallaght-Kilnamanagh situated east of a line drawn along the M50 Western Parkway.	Transfer of Kimmage C, and Terenure A, B, C and D to Dublin Bay South.
2024–	4	In the city of Dublin, the electoral divisions of Carna, Chapelizod, Cherry-Orchard A, Cherry-Orchard C, Crumlin A, Crumlin B, Crumlin C, Crumlin D, Crumlin E, Crumlin F, Decies, Drumfinn, Inchicore A, Inchicore B, Kilmainham A, Kilmainham B, Kilmainham C, Kimmage A, Kimmage B, Kimmage C, Kimmage D, Kimmage E, Kylemore, Merchants Quay A, Merchants Quay B, Merchants Quay C, Merchants Quay D, Merchants Quay E, Merchants Quay F, Ushers A, Ushers B, Ushers C, Ushers D, Ushers E, Ushers F, Walkinstown A, Walkinstown B, Walkinstown C; and that part of the electoral division of Phoenix Park situated south of a line drawn along Chapelizod Road, Conyngham Road and Parkgate Street.	Transfer of Kimmage C from Dublin Bay South; transfer to Dublin South-West of Templeogue-Kimmage Manor, Terenure-Greentrees, Terenure-Cherryfield, Clondalkin-Ballymount (Part North of M50) and Tallaght-Kilnamanagh (Part North of M50); transfer to Dublin Mid-West of Clondalkin-Monastery (Part North of M50)

== TDs ==
Teachtaí Dála (TDs) for Dublin South-Central 1948–
Key to parties: AAA–PBP = AAA–PBP; CnaP = Clann na Poblachta; DL = Democratic Left; FF = Fianna Fáil; FG = Fine Gael; GP = Green; Ind. = Independent; I4C = Inds. 4 Change; Lab = Labour; PBP = People Before Profit; SF = Sinn Féin; SD = Social Democrats; S–PBP = Solidarity–PBP; WP = Workers' Party
Dáil	Election	Deputy (Party)	Deputy (Party)	Deputy (Party)	Deputy (Party)	Deputy (Party)
13th	1948	Seán Lemass (FF)	James Larkin Jnr (Lab)	Con Lehane (CnaP)	Maurice E. Dockrell (FG)	John McCann (FF)
14th	1951	Seán Lemass (FF)	James Larkin Jnr (Lab)	Philip Brady (FF)	Maurice E. Dockrell (FG)	John McCann (FF)
15th	1954	Seán Lemass (FF)	James Larkin Jnr (Lab)	Thomas Finlay (FG)	Maurice E. Dockrell (FG)	Celia Lynch (FF)
16th	1957	Seán Lemass (FF)	Jack Murphy (Ind.)	Philip Brady (FF)	Maurice E. Dockrell (FG)	Celia Lynch (FF)
16th	1958 by-election	Seán Lemass (FF)	Patrick Cummins (FF)	Philip Brady (FF)	Maurice E. Dockrell (FG)	Celia Lynch (FF)
17th	1961	Seán Lemass (FF)	Patrick Cummins (FF)	Philip Brady (FF)	Maurice E. Dockrell (FG)	Joseph Barron (CnaP)
18th	1965	Seán Lemass (FF)	Frank Cluskey (Lab)	Philip Brady (FF)	Maurice E. Dockrell (FG)	Thomas J. Fitzpatrick (FF)
19th	1969	Richie Ryan (FG)	Ben Briscoe (FF)	Philip Brady (FF)	John O'Donovan (Lab)	4 seats 1969–1977
20th	1973	Richie Ryan (FG)	Ben Briscoe (FF)	Philip Brady (FF)	John Kelly (FG)	4 seats 1969–1977
21st	1977	Fergus O'Brien (FG)	Frank Cluskey (Lab)	Thomas J. Fitzpatrick (FF)	3 seats 1977–1981	
22nd	1981	Fergus O'Brien (FG)	Ben Briscoe (FF)	Thomas J. Fitzpatrick (FF)	Gay Mitchell (FG)	John O'Connell (Note: O'Connell served as Ceann Comhairle in the 22nd and 23rd Dáil from 1981 to 1983 and was returned automatically at the February 1982 and November 1982 general elections. He joined Fianna Fáil in January 1985.) (Ind.)
23rd	1982 (Feb)	Frank Cluskey (Lab)	Ben Briscoe (FF)	Thomas J. Fitzpatrick (FF)	Gay Mitchell (FG)	John O'Connell (Ind.)
24th	1982 (Nov)	Frank Cluskey (Lab)	Ben Briscoe (FF)	Fergus O'Brien (FG)	Gay Mitchell (FG)	John O'Connell (Ind.)
25th	1987	Frank Cluskey (Lab)	Ben Briscoe (FF)	Fergus O'Brien (FG)	Gay Mitchell (FG)	Mary Mooney (FF)
26th	1989	John O'Connell (FF)	Ben Briscoe (FF)	Fergus O'Brien (FG)	Gay Mitchell (FG)	Eric Byrne (WP)
27th	1992	John O'Connell (FF)	Ben Briscoe (FF)	Pat Upton (Lab)	Gay Mitchell (FG)	4 seats 1992–2002
27th	1994 by-election	Eric Byrne (DL)	Ben Briscoe (FF)	Pat Upton (Lab)	Gay Mitchell (FG)	4 seats 1992–2002
28th	1997	Seán Ardagh (FF)	Ben Briscoe (FF)	Pat Upton (Lab)	Gay Mitchell (FG)	4 seats 1992–2002
28th	1999 by-election	Seán Ardagh (FF)	Ben Briscoe (FF)	Mary Upton (Lab)	Gay Mitchell (FG)	4 seats 1992–2002
29th	2002	Seán Ardagh (FF)	Aengus Ó Snodaigh (SF)	Mary Upton (Lab)	Gay Mitchell (FG)	Michael Mulcahy (FF)
30th	2007	Seán Ardagh (FF)	Aengus Ó Snodaigh (SF)	Mary Upton (Lab)	Catherine Byrne (FG)	Michael Mulcahy (FF)
31st	2011	Eric Byrne (Lab)	Aengus Ó Snodaigh (SF)	Joan Collins (PBP)	Catherine Byrne (FG)	Michael Conaghan (Lab)
32nd	2016	Bríd Smith (AAA–PBP)	Aengus Ó Snodaigh (SF)	Joan Collins (Note: Founded Right to Change in May 2020.) (I4C)	Catherine Byrne (FG)	4 seats from 2016
33rd	2020	Bríd Smith (S–PBP)	Aengus Ó Snodaigh (SF)	Joan Collins (I4C)	Patrick Costello (GP)	4 seats from 2016
34th	2024	Catherine Ardagh (FF)	Aengus Ó Snodaigh (SF)	Máire Devine (SF)	Jen Cummins (SD)	4 seats from 2016

Note: The columns in this table are used only for presentational purposes, and no significance should be attached to the order of columns. For details of the order in which seats were won at each election, see the detailed results of that election.

== Elections ==
*: Outgoing TD

=== 2024 general election ===
2024 general election: Dublin South-Central
Party	Candidate	FPv%	Count														
Party	Candidate	FPv%	1	2	3	4	5	6	7	8	9	10	11	12	13	14	15
Sinn Féin	Aengus Ó Snodaigh	12.0	4,497	4,499	4,506	4,520	4,521	4,551	4,606	4,679	4,835	4,865	4,932	6,374	6,878	7,117	7,137
Fianna Fáil	Catherine Ardagh	10.7	3,988	3,989	3,989	3,999	4,027	4,035	4,054	4,073	4,260	4,488	6,634	6,693	7,163	8,027	
Sinn Féin	Máire Devine	10.3	3,854	3,857	3,861	3,866	3,872	3,890	3,919	3,953	4,149	4,182	4,232	5,711	6,216	6,487	6,509
Social Democrats	Jen Cummins	8.9	3,347	3,368	3,370	3,378	3,383	3,396	3,411	3,434	3,550	4,288	4,499	4,561	5,054	6,970	7,404
PBP–Solidarity	Hazel De Nortúin (Note: De Nortúin is a member of People Before Profit.)	8.9	3,331	3,362	3,372	3,406	3,422	3,487	3,551	3,638	3,810	3,952	4,063	4,405	5,488	6,036	6,115
Sinn Féin	Daithí Doolan	8.8	3,290	3,290	3,295	3,317	3,328	3,361	3,424	3,463	3,563	3,594	3,649				
Fine Gael	Mary Seery Kearney	8.2	3,056	3,056	3,064	3,075	3,081	3,094	3,103	3,115	3,194	3,451					
Right to Change	Joan Collins	7.8	2,907	2,916	2,923	2,936	2,992	3,050	3,151	3,272	3,590	3,679	3,861	3,960			
Labour	Darragh Moriarty	6.6	2,476	2,491	2,496	2,512	2,520	2,542	2,578	2,598	2,668	3,454	3,920	3,987	4,333		
Green	Patrick Costello	6.1	2,267	2,285	2,286	2,289	2,299	2,304	2,314	2,323	2,372						
Aontú	Aisling Considine	4.0	1,474	1,476	1,495	1,511	1,579	1,616	1,703	2,178							
Irish Freedom	Barry Ward	2.0	751	751	767	784	849	978	1,326								
Independent Ireland	Philip Sutcliffe Snr (Note: Sutcliffe was a member of Independent Ireland, but left the party during the general election campaign.)	1.8	686	688	738	771	801	966									
Independent	Dolores Webster	1.5	549	552	561	615	640										
The Irish People	Jina Ahearne	0.9	321	321	334	346											
Independent	Richard Murray	0.7	264	269	281												
Independent Ireland	Rebecca Hendrick	0.5	172	173													
Rabharta	John Paul Murphy	0.3	114														
Electorate: 77,072 Valid: 37,344 Spoilt: 475 Quota: 7,469 Turnout: 37,819 (49.1%)

=== 2020 general election ===
2020 general election: Dublin South-Central
Party	Candidate	FPv%	Count					
Party	Candidate	FPv%	1	2	3	4	5	6
Sinn Féin	Aengus Ó Snodaigh	39.3	17,015					
Fine Gael	Catherine Byrne	11.7	5,078	5,192	5,202	5,275	5,788	7,431
Fianna Fáil	Catherine Ardagh	11.0	4,782	5,013	5,030	5,184	5,598	
Solidarity–PBP	Bríd Smith (Note: Smith was a member of People Before Profit.)	11.0	4,753	9,547				
Green	Patrick Costello	9.3	4,041	4,449	4,522	4,698	6,917	8,582
Inds. 4 Change	Joan Collins	6.5	2,831	4,578	5,076	5,552	6,654	7,807
Labour	Rebecca Moynihan	4.8	2,095	2,330	2,375	2,491		
Social Democrats	Tara Deacy	3.7	1,595	1,921	2,006	2,181		
National Party	Serina Irvine	1.5	632	770	801			
Independent	Richard Murray	0.5	207	420	512			
Independent	Alan Kerrigan	0.3	146	241	257			
Independent	Robert Foley	0.2	78	114	121			
Independent	Sean O'Leary	0.1	38	57	71			
Electorate: 79,460 Valid: 43,291 Spoilt: 515 (1.2%) Quota: 8,659 Turnout: 43,806 (55.1%)

=== 2016 general election ===
2016 general election: Dublin South-Central
Party	Candidate	FPv%	Count										
Party	Candidate	FPv%	1	2	3	4	5	6	7	8	9	10	11
Sinn Féin	Aengus Ó Snodaigh	15.5	6,639	6,690	6,715	6,734	6,927	7,061	9,566				
Inds. 4 Change	Joan Collins	14.5	6,195	6,303	6,374	6,461	7,034	7,666	8,168	8,618			
Fine Gael	Catherine Byrne	14.3	6,130	6,154	6,317	6,516	6,679	7,037	7,090	7,111	9,723		
Fianna Fáil	Catherine Ardagh	12.7	5,441	5,508	5,698	5,817	6,064	6,439	6,556	6,617	7,116	7,841	7,844
AAA–PBP	Bríd Smith	10.2	4,374	4,476	4,527	4,729	5,193	5,853	6,208	6,643	7,410	7,836	7,879
Sinn Féin	Máire Devine	7.8	3,332	3,363	3,389	3,423	3,531	3,686					
Labour	Eric Byrne	7.7	3,297	3,314	3,372	3,645	3,822	4,481	4,531	4,558			
Social Democrats	Liam Coyne	5.7	2,434	2,486	2,595	2,998	3,256						
Independent	Paul Hand	4.7	2,011	2,100	2,222	2,358							
Green	Oisín Ó hAlmhain	3.3	1,410	1,431	1,514								
Renua	Michael Gargan	2.1	893	943									
Direct Democracy	Neville Bradley	1.0	407										
Independent	Richard Murray	0.7	294										
Electorate: 74,942 Valid: 42,857 Spoilt: 694 (1.6%) Quota: 8,572 Turnout: 43,551 (58.1%)

=== 2011 general election ===
2011 general election: Dublin South-Central
Party	Candidate	FPv%	Count												
Party	Candidate	FPv%	1	2	3	4	5	6	7	8	9	10	11	12	13
Labour	Eric Byrne	16.4	8,357	8,367	8,380	8,391	8,401	8,411	8,416	8,721					
Sinn Féin	Aengus Ó Snodaigh	13.4	6,804	6,819	6,835	6,838	6,849	6,874	6,885	7,041	7,111	7,123	7,455	7,569	7,719
People Before Profit	Joan Collins (Note: Collins campaigned as a member of the United Left Alliance.)	12.9	6,574	6,585	6,606	6,630	6,653	6,691	6,728	7,042	7,166	7,194	7,773	7,978	8,459
Fine Gael	Catherine Byrne	11.0	5,604	5,610	5,614	5,618	5,626	5,630	5,663	5,915	7,120	7,142	7,780	11,867	
Labour	Michael Conaghan	10.8	5,492	5,497	5,501	5,505	5,509	5,537	5,544	5,726	5,819	5,904	8,194	8,463	9,858
Fianna Fáil	Michael Mulcahy	9.5	4,837	4,844	4,845	4,850	4,865	4,869	4,932	5,059	5,186	5,195	5,465	5,698	6,161
Labour	Henry Upton	8.2	4,183	4,187	4,192	4,208	4,218	4,226	4,231	4,459	4,675	4,747			
Fine Gael	Colm Brophy	6.6	3,376	3,377	3,384	3,387	3,393	3,396	3,418	3,537	4,842	4,847	5,199		
Fine Gael	Ruairi McGinley	5.8	2,976	2,980	2,983	2,983	2,991	2,996	3,010	3,128					
Green	Oisín Ó hAlmhain	2.0	1,015	1,015	1,019	1,031	1,038	1,042	1,051						
Independent	Peter O'Neill	0.9	456	465	469	479	501	539	549						
Independent	Neville Bradley	0.6	323	328	364	368	391	410	425						
Christian Solidarity	Colm Callanan	0.5	239	239	241	246	247	251							
Independent	Seán Connolly Farrell	0.3	178	182	190	198	217								
Independent	Paul King	0.3	146	156	158	176									
Independent	Gerry Kelly	0.3	137	139	143										
Independent	Noel Bennett	0.3	128	128											
Independent	Dominic Mooney	0.2	102												
Electorate: 80,203 Valid: 50,927 Spoilt: 817 (1.6%) Quota: 8,488 Turnout: 51,744 (64.5%)

=== 2007 general election ===
2007 general election: Dublin South-Central
Party	Candidate	FPv%	Count									
Party	Candidate	FPv%	1	2	3	4	5	6	7	8	9	10
Fianna Fáil	Seán Ardagh	17.4	8,286									
Fianna Fáil	Michael Mulcahy	15.7	7,439	7,687	8,186							
Labour	Mary Upton	12.6	5,987	6,006	6,133	6,186	6,532	6,818	7,136	7,759	9,020	
Sinn Féin	Aengus Ó Snodaigh	10.2	4,825	4,838	4,913	4,922	5,039	5,648	5,772	6,509	6,932	7,001
Fine Gael	Catherine Byrne	9.9	4,713	4,728	4,847	4,890	5,068	5,231	6,719	7,050	7,663	7,921
Labour	Eric Byrne	8.5	4,054	4,071	4,144	4,165	4,337	4,493	4,754	5,332	6,227	6,932
Green	Tony McDermott	5.8	2,756	2,764	2,872	2,904	3,139	3,278	3,416	3,781		
Independent	Joan Collins	4.6	2,203	2,212	2,277	2,288	2,552	3,253	3,362			
Fine Gael	Anne Marie Martin	4.5	2,125	2,131	2,230	2,269	2,441	2,558				
People Before Profit	Bríd Smith	4.4	2,086	2,090	2,205	2,221	2,383					
Independent	Roisín Healy	3.4	1,613	1,619	1,726	1,766						
Progressive Democrats	Frank McNamara	1.0	474	480								
Progressive Democrats	Ben Doyle	0.9	438	449								
Workers' Party	Andrew McGuinness	0.5	256	257								
Christian Solidarity	Michael Redmond	0.3	155	155								
Independent	Con Gunning	0.3	121	122								
Electorate: 86,710 Valid: 47,531 Spoilt: 789 (1.6%) Quota: 7,922 Turnout: 48,320 (55.7%)

Seán Ardagh resigned as a TD on 28 January 2011. The 30th Dáil was dissolved four days later, on 1 February 2011.

=== 2002 general election ===
2002 general election: Dublin South-Central
Party	Candidate	FPv%	Count										
Party	Candidate	FPv%	1	2	3	4	5	6	7	8	9	10	11
Fianna Fáil	Seán Ardagh	13.7	6,031	6,033	6,047	6,066	6,131	6,202	6,399	6,472	6,595	8,207	
Sinn Féin	Aengus Ó Snodaigh	12.7	5,591	5,619	5,759	5,879	6,099	6,376	6,431	6,522	6,892	7,282	7,523
Fine Gael	Gay Mitchell	12.4	5,444	5,456	5,469	5,507	5,612	5,708	5,941	7,280	7,709		
Fianna Fáil	Michael Mulcahy	11.3	4,990	4,994	5,007	5,024	5,102	5,165	5,342	5,391	5,497	7,364	
Labour	Mary Upton	10.3	4,520	4,529	4,593	4,677	4,749	4,863	5,110	5,332	6,286	6,675	6,963
Labour	Eric Byrne	9.4	4,159	4,188	4,265	4,365	4,436	4,568	4,659	4,839	5,438	5,658	5,844
Fianna Fáil	Marian McGennis	9.3	4,085	4,085	4,110	4,160	4,199	4,423	4,581	4,676	4,827		
Green	Kristina McElroy	5.2	2,299	2,311	2,400	2,491	2,575	2,771	2,974	3,115			
Fine Gael	Catherine Byrne	4.6	2,012	2,015	2,025	2,059	2,091	2,146	2,259				
Progressive Democrats	Bob Quinn	3.1	1,377	1,381	1,395	1,405	1,472	1,534					
Independent	Vincent Jackson	2.6	1,142	1,147	1,203	1,323	1,411						
Independent	Áine Ní Chonaill	2.1	926	930	949	966							
Socialist Workers	Bríd Smith	1.4	617	633									
Workers' Party	Linda Kavanagh	1.3	553	692	782								
Workers' Party	Shay Kelly	0.6	270										
Electorate: 86,161 Valid: 44,016 Spoilt: 752 (1.7%) Quota: 7,337 Turnout: 44,768 (51.9%)

=== 1999 by-election ===
Labour Party TD Pat Upton died on 22 February 1999. A by-election to fill the vacancy was held on 27 October 1999. The seat was won by the Labour Party candidate Mary Upton, sister of the deceased TD.

1999 by-election: Dublin South-Central
Party	Candidate	FPv%	Count							
Party	Candidate	FPv%	1	2	3	4	5	6	7	8
Fianna Fáil	Michael Mulcahy	30.1	6,050	6,059	6,108	6,157	6,330	6,497	7,005	7,901
Labour	Mary Upton	28.0	5,637	5,648	5,683	5,831	5,913	6,545	7,148	10,274
Fine Gael	Catherine Byrne	20.1	4,037	4,064	4,093	4,154	4,240	4,559	4,778	
Sinn Féin	Aengus Ó Snodaigh	8.4	1,686	1,689	1,708	1,800	1,849	2,051		
Green	John Goodwillie	6.3	1,263	1,297	1,330	1,477	1,588			
Christian Solidarity	Manus MacMeanmain	2.0	399	404	601	616				
Workers' Party	Shay Kelly	2.8	555	561	566					
Independent	Eammon Murphy	1.9	383	387						
Natural Law	John Burns	0.5	106							
Electorate: 69,771 Valid: 20,116 Quota: 10,059 Turnout: 28.8%

=== 1997 general election ===
1997 general election: Dublin South-Central
Party	Candidate	FPv%	Count														
Party	Candidate	FPv%	1	2	3	4	5	6	7	8	9	10	11	12	13	14	15
Fine Gael	Gay Mitchell	22.0	8,910														
Fianna Fáil	Ben Briscoe	11.7	4,762	4,794	4,796	4,802	4,811	4,816	4,818	4,820	4,825	4,916	4,964	5,104	5,673	5,969	8,005
Fianna Fáil	Seán Ardagh	11.4	4,634	4,650	4,650	4,654	4,660	4,662	4,671	4,678	4,679	4,773	4,815	4,915	5,556	5,895	8,222
Democratic Left	Eric Byrne	11.3	4,586	4,667	4,669	4,672	4,676	4,677	4,688	4,695	4,727	4,983	5,292	5,764	5,944	6,411	6,818
Fianna Fáil	Michael Mulcahy	11.3	4,574	4,606	4,607	4,614	4,623	4,625	4,630	4,639	4,647	4,736	4,797	4,895	5,319	5,659	
Labour	Pat Upton	10.4	4,224	4,354	4,356	4,361	4,364	4,369	4,383	4,392	4,424	4,608	5,529	6,033	6,300	6,703	7,085
Progressive Democrats	Cáit Keane	5.0	2,031	2,050	2,052	2,054	2,061	2,065	2,071	2,076	2,078	2,161	2,251	2,457			
Sinn Féin	Martina Kenna	4.8	1,937	1,943	1,943	1,955	1,961	1,964	1,973	1,991	2,024	2,268	2,310	2,496	2,574		
Green	John Goodwillie	3.9	1,603	1,617	1,620	1,626	1,635	1,665	1,684	1,700	1,715	1,976	2,094				
Fine Gael	Ruairi McGinley	3.0	1,215	1,652	1,654	1,657	1,661	1,667	1,676	1,686	1,690	1,776					
Independent	Éamonn Gavin	0.9	367	371	372	374	387	405	423	443	445						
Independent	Andre Lyder	0.8	350	354	355	360	363	369	384	404	410						
Socialist Party	Martin Walsh	0.8	328	331	332	336	338	339	343	353	424						
Workers' Party	Shay Kelly	0.7	297	301	301	301	301	305	306	316	328						
Socialist Workers	Bríd Smith	0.5	218	222	222	223	223	223	225	232							
Independent	Brendan O'Reilly	0.3	132	135	135	137	140	145									
Independent	Seán Kelly	0.3	125	127	128	143	149	153	165								
Natural Law	Michael Dwyer	0.2	92	93	94	95	100										
Independent	Colm Callanan	0.2	91	92	93	93											
Independent	Dean O'Nualláin	0.2	80	81	81												
Independent	David Henry	0.1	23	23													
Electorate: 68,146 Valid: 40,579 Spoilt: 550 (1.3%) Quota: 8,116 Turnout: 41,129 (60.4%)

=== 1994 by-election ===
Fianna Fáil TD John O'Connell resigned on 24 February 1993. A by-election to fill the vacancy was held on 9 June 1994.

1994 by-election: Dublin South-Central
Party	Candidate	FPv%	Count								
Party	Candidate	FPv%	1	2	3	4	5	6	7	8	9
Democratic Left	Eric Byrne	27.8	7,445	7,479	7,601	7,748	7,930	8,352	8,984	10,284	12,741
Fianna Fáil	Michael Mulcahy	21.1	5,642	5,697	5,770	5,893	6,043	6,335	6,664	7,370	8,629
Fine Gael	Brian Hayes	17.3	4,637	4,677	4,723	4,752	4,926	5,628	6,028	6,619	
Labour	Joe Connolly	9.9	2,643	2,664	2,743	2,824	2,904	3,062	3,417		
Progressive Democrats	Cáit Keane	7.0	1,881	1,912	1,939	1,955	2,095				
Green	John Goodwillie	6.5	1,752	1,809	1,904	2,138	2,332	2,579			
Independent	Eamonn Gavin	3.6	972	1,038	1,053	1,088					
Sinn Féin	Martina Gibney	2.9	781	800	859						
Workers' Party	Shay Kelly	2.2	595	618							
Independent	Michael Park	1.0	275								
Independent	Benny Cooney	0.6	152								
Electorate: 62,300 Valid: 26,775 Quota: 13,388 Turnout: 43.0%

=== 1992 general election ===
1992 general election: Dublin South-Central
Party	Candidate	FPv%	Count												
Party	Candidate	FPv%	1	2	3	4	5	6	7	8	9	10	11	12	13
Labour	Pat Upton	29.6	11,923												
Fine Gael	Gay Mitchell	16.6	6,662	7,578	7,595	7,630	7,672	7,829	8,730						
Fianna Fáil	John O'Connell	14.5	5,825	6,084	6,089	6,105	6,180	6,271	6,306	6,336	6,461	7,337	7,583	8,182	
Fianna Fáil	Ben Briscoe	10.9	4,385	4,539	4,547	4,566	4,602	4,754	4,778	4,816	4,875	5,634	5,873	6,417	6,526
Democratic Left	Eric Byrne	7.4	2,990	4,021	4,037	4,080	4,153	4,192	4,238	4,310	4,704	4,766	5,492	6,497	6,521
Progressive Democrats	Cáit Keane	4.7	1,886	2,235	2,252	2,258	2,273	2,300	2,449	2,858	2,977	3,047	3,428		
Fianna Fáil	Michael Mulcahy	4.2	1,684	1,762	1,768	1,779	1,822	1,888	1,905	1,916	1,946				
Green	Mary Bowers	3.2	1,295	1,581	1,620	1,672	1,856	1,995	2,036	2,142	2,441	2,499			
Fine Gael	Edith Wynne	2.5	1,005	1,241	1,244	1,248	1,257	1,284							
Christian Centrist	Eamonn Murphy	2.1	832	863	869	888	907								
Workers' Party	Rita Whelan	1.8	717	1,144	1,153	1,189	1,320	1,345	1,377	1,392					
Sinn Féin	Martina Gibney	1.7	675	722	724	751									
Independent	Davy Heinkel Johnston	0.6	235	272	291										
Independent	Mary Daly	0.3	128	151											
Electorate: 63,718 Valid: 40,242 Spoilt: 892 (2.2%) Quota: 8,049 Turnout: 41,134 (64.6%)

=== 1989 general election ===
1989 general election: Dublin South-Central
Party	Candidate	FPv%	Count								
Party	Candidate	FPv%	1	2	3	4	5	6	7	8	9
Fine Gael	Gay Mitchell	17.5	7,905								
Fianna Fáil	John O'Connell	17.1	7,707								
Workers' Party	Eric Byrne	15.2	6,849	6,878	6,887	6,903	7,261	7,348	7,588		
Fianna Fáil	Ben Briscoe	13.4	6,037	6,055	6,142	6,149	6,220	6,282	6,326	6,657	7,050
Fine Gael	Fergus O'Brien	9.1	4,108	4,374	4,381	4,389	4,440	5,269	5,375	5,863	7,411
Fianna Fáil	Mary Mooney	9.1	4,081	4,098	4,174	4,183	4,301	4,378	4,420	4,742	5,235
Green	Mary Bowers	5.0	2,264	2,272	2,275	2,320	2,597	2,691	2,756		
Labour	Pat Upton	4.2	1,907	1,919	1,922	1,927	2,034	2,126	3,289	4,327	
Labour	Pat Murray	3.5	1,557	1,570	1,572	1,583	1,664	1,724			
Progressive Democrats	Ronnie McBrien	2.9	1,314	1,338	1,340	1,348	1,361				
Sinn Féin	Micheál O Muireagáin	2.8	1,241	1,243	1,245	1,253					
Independent	Michael John Foley	0.3	122	122	122						
Electorate: 72,389 Valid: 45,092 Quota: 7,516 Turnout: 62.3%

=== 1987 general election ===
1987 general election: Dublin South-Central
Party	Candidate	FPv%	Count										
Party	Candidate	FPv%	1	2	3	4	5	6	7	8	9	10	11
Fianna Fáil	Ben Briscoe	18.5	9,582										
Fine Gael	Gay Mitchell	15.7	8,107	8,145	8,148	8,163	8,169	8,259	8,306	8,768			
Fine Gael	Fergus O'Brien	11.9	6,160	6,183	6,184	6,192	6,196	6,267	6,308	6,519	9,730		
Fianna Fáil	John O'Connell	11.4	5,911	6,257	6,259	6,260	6,271	6,310	6,488	6,853	7,211	7,239	7,380
Fianna Fáil	Mary Mooney	10.9	5,656	6,101	6,101	6,113	6,131	6,193	6,447	7,053	7,522	7,559	7,712
Progressive Democrats	Ronald McBrien	10.1	5,212	5,236	5,239	5,259	5,266	5,420	5,456	5,842			
Labour	Frank Cluskey	9.1	4,701	4,738	4,741	4,756	4,795	4,976	5,110	7,040	8,203	8,290	9,110
Workers' Party	Eric Byrne	7.6	3,946	3,978	3,997	4,014	4,109	4,224	4,638				
Sinn Féin	Micheal Ó Muireagáin	2.5	1,266	1,271	1,281	1,282	1,326	1,343					
Independent	Timothy Cahill	1.4	711	715	716	756	777						
Communist	Deirdre Buggle	0.4	186	192	248	265							
Independent	Barbara Hyland	0.3	152	152	155								
Communist	Michael Wall	0.2	102	102									
Electorate: 78,116 Valid: 51,692 Quota: 8,616 Turnout: 66.2%

Frank Cluskey died on 7 May 1989. The seat remained vacant until the dissolution of the 25th Dáil on 25 May 1989.

=== November 1982 general election ===
John O'Connell was Ceann Comhairle at the dissolution of the 23rd Dáil and therefore deemed to be returned automatically. The constituency was treated as a four-seater for the purposes of calculating the quota.

November 1982 general election: Dublin South-Central
Party	Candidate	FPv%	Count					
Party	Candidate	FPv%	1	2	3	4	5	6
Independent	John O'Connell	N/A	Returned automatically					
Fine Gael	Gay Mitchell	22.0	10,074					
Fianna Fáil	Ben Briscoe	20.4	9,336					
Fine Gael	Fergus O'Brien	17.6	8,068	8,817	8,878	8,901	9,028	9,609
Labour	Frank Cluskey	14.0	6,425	6,512	6,661	6,687	6,849	9,256
Fianna Fáil	Thomas J. Fitzpatrick	10.1	4,616	4,631	4,648	4,983	7,182	7,758
Workers' Party	Eric Byrne	8.2	3,774	3,804	4,004	4,022	4,119	
Fianna Fáil	Lauri Corcoran	5.3	2,426	2,439	2,464	2,705		
Fianna Fáil	Michael Stokes	1.4	641	643	659			
Democratic Socialist	Séamus Rattigan	0.7	303	305				
Independent	Brendan Moran	0.4	195	199				
Electorate: 74,522 Valid: 45,858 Quota: 9,172 Turnout: 61.5%

=== February 1982 general election ===
John O'Connell was Ceann Comhairle at the dissolution of the 22nd Dáil and therefore deemed to be returned automatically. The constituency was treated as a four-seater for the purposes of calculating the quota.

February 1982 general election: Dublin South-Central
Party	Candidate	FPv%	Count							
Party	Candidate	FPv%	1	2	3	4	5	6	7	8
Independent	John O'Connell	N/A	Returned automatically							
Fine Gael	Gay Mitchell	22.5	10,572							
Fianna Fáil	Ben Briscoe	22.2	10,432							
Fine Gael	Fergus O'Brien	14.1	6,635	7,597	7,631	7,651	7,674	8,171	8,297	8,785
Labour	Frank Cluskey	14.0	6,600	6,717	6,763	6,793	6,874	8,429	8,650	9,267
Fianna Fáil	Thomas J. Fitzpatrick	13.0	6,132	6,158	6,512	6,522	6,555	6,938	10,522	
Sinn Féin The Workers' Party	Eric Byrne	6.7	3,166	3,190	3,221	3,247	3,373			
Fianna Fáil	Joseph Dowling	6.6	3,102	3,123	3,657	3,671	3,707	4,136		
Independent	Aidan Broggy	0.6	296	298	311	350				
Independent	John Curran	0.3	147	150	153					
Electorate: 74,104 Valid: 47,082 Quota: 9,417 Turnout: 63.5%

=== 1981 general election ===
1981 general election: Dublin South-Central
Party	Candidate	FPv%	Count						
Party	Candidate	FPv%	1	2	3	4	5	6	7
Independent	John O'Connell	19.4	9,491						
Fianna Fáil	Ben Briscoe	16.7	8,181						
Fine Gael	Fergus O'Brien	15.1	7,404	7,696	7,707	7,746	7,872		
Fine Gael	Gay Mitchell	14.1	6,879	7,147	7,163	7,215	7,369	7,715	7,918
Fianna Fáil	Thomas J. Fitzpatrick	11.6	5,686	5,855	5,865	5,890	5,958	6,230	8,940
Labour	Frank Cluskey	8.4	4,122	4,323	4,323	4,723	5,410	6,622	6,744
Fianna Fáil	Brian Hillery	6.1	2,948	3,067	3,074	3,092	3,137	3,265	
Sinn Féin The Workers' Party	Eric Byrne	4.9	2,403	2,538	2,554	2,664	2,788		
Labour	Michael Collins	2.2	1,069	1,157	1,157	1,233			
Labour	Séamus Ashe	1.4	693	742	742				
Independent	Daniel McCarron	0.2	73	84					
Electorate: 74,014 Valid: 48,949 Quota: 8,159 Turnout: 66.1%

=== 1977 general election ===
1977 general election: Dublin South-Central
Party	Candidate	FPv%	Count				
Party	Candidate	FPv%	1	2	3	4	5
Fine Gael	Fergus O'Brien	25.2	5,931				
Fianna Fáil	Thomas J. Fitzpatrick	19.3	4,542	5,015	5,058	5,239	5,566
Labour	Frank Cluskey	16.9	3,986	4,024	4,177	4,711	6,991
Fianna Fáil	Michael Campion	13.7	3,218	3,579	3,595	3,804	4,018
Fine Gael	Alexis Fitzgerald	10.5	2,483	2,523	3,389	3,542	
Sinn Féin The Workers' Party	Andy Smith	5.6	1,313	1,340	1,345		
Fine Gael	Maurice Dockrell	4.7	1,096	1,101			
Fianna Fáil	Vera Kinsella	4.1	959				
Electorate: 37,934 Valid: 23,528 Spoilt: 245 (0.9%) Quota: 5,883 Turnout: 25,773 (67.9%)

=== 1973 general election ===
1973 general election: Dublin South-Central
Party	Candidate	FPv%	Count								
Party	Candidate	FPv%	1	2	3	4	5	6	7	8	9
Fine Gael	Richie Ryan	20.6	7,210								
Fianna Fáil	Philip Brady	18.7	6,564	6,567	6,728	6,740	6,819	6,865	7,646		
Fine Gael	John Kelly	14.5	5,064	5,165	5,266	6,102	6,263	6,505	6,590	6,612	6,993
Fianna Fáil	Ben Briscoe	13.6	4,750	4,752	4,877	4,894	4,951	4,992	6,348	6,957	7,060
Labour	John O'Donovan	6.3	2,203	2,219	2,271	2,373	2,858	3,899	3,935	3,939	6,207
Fianna Fáil	Gerard Buchanan	6.3	2,195	2,196	2,265	2,275	2,302	2,321			
Labour	Michael Collins	6.1	2,136	2,142	2,187	2,237	2,621	3,085	3,102	3,105	
Labour	Dermot O'Rourke	4.5	1,580	1,590	1,640	1,741	1,993				
Sinn Féin	Peigín Doyle	4.3	1,521	1,523	1,581	1,600					
Fine Gael	Michael McShane	3.0	1,040	1,098	1,177						
Independent	Louis Maguire	2.2	775	778							
Electorate: 50,400 Valid: 35,038 Quota: 7,008 Turnout: 69.5%

=== 1969 general election ===
1969 general election: Dublin South-Central
Party	Candidate	FPv%	Count										
Party	Candidate	FPv%	1	2	3	4	5	6	7	8	9	10	11
Fine Gael	Richie Ryan	16.9	5,958	5,971	5,989	6,234	6,501	6,546	6,607	6,674	7,385		
Fianna Fáil	Philip Brady	15.7	5,527	5,537	5,548	5,561	5,573	5,594	5,705	6,835	7,022	7,037	7,152
Fianna Fáil	Ben Briscoe	14.3	5,035	5,058	5,073	5,089	5,100	5,135	5,206	6,494	6,758	6,778	6,933
Fine Gael	John Kelly	11.0	3,868	3,882	3,893	4,009	4,370	4,397	4,444	4,479	5,365	5,627	5,845
Fianna Fáil	Louis Maguire	7.6	2,661	2,672	2,681	2,689	2,704	2,722	2,743				
Labour	Dermot O'Rourke	7.1	2,488	2,499	2,519	2,551	2,567	2,768	3,189	3,235	3,503	3,519	
Independent	Maurice O'Connell	7.0	2,475	2,494	2,523	2,586	2,631	2,694	2,808	2,897			
Labour	John O'Donovan	7.0	2,450	2,456	2,465	2,479	2,493	2,913	4,360	4,401	4,815	4,845	7,338
Labour	Emmet Boyle	5.0	1,757	1,767	1,781	1,791	1,798	2,370					
Labour	John Clarke	4.0	1,392	1,400	1,421	1,425	1,430						
Fine Gael	Patrick Kelly	1.9	677	685	686	773							
Fine Gael	Michael McShane	1.7	602	605	610								
Independent	Patrick Dunne	0.5	166	176									
Independent	James Hiney	0.4	149										
Electorate: 50,525 Valid: 35,205 Quota: 7,042 Turnout: 69.7%

=== 1965 general election ===
1965 general election: Dublin South-Central
Party	Candidate	FPv%	Count								
Party	Candidate	FPv%	1	2	3	4	5	6	7	8	9
Fianna Fáil	Seán Lemass	34.7	12,400								
Labour	Frank Cluskey	19.9	7,098								
Fine Gael	Maurice E. Dockrell	19.0	6,768								
Clann na Poblachta	Joseph Barron	6.2	2,220	2,456	2,877	2,914	3,032	3,137	3,241	3,295	4,355
Fianna Fáil	Philip Brady	6.1	2,175	5,373	5,461	5,479	5,492	5,547	7,199		
Fianna Fáil	Patrick Cummins	4.1	1,464	2,795	2,875	2,881	2,897	2,919			
Fianna Fáil	Thomas J. Fitzpatrick	3.8	1,349	2,849	2,913	2,925	2,939	2,953	3,801	4,964	5,237
Fine Gael	George McLoughlin	2.9	1,032	1,132	1,432	1,969	2,001	3,086	3,230	3,263	
Fine Gael	John Nugent	2.8	1,002	1,068	1,198	1,403	1,421				
Irish Workers' Party	Michael O'Riordan	0.5	183	203	269	273					
Electorate: 54,929 Valid: 35,691 Quota: 5,949 Turnout: 65.0%

=== 1961 general election ===
1961 general election: Dublin South-Central
Party	Candidate	FPv%	Count										
Party	Candidate	FPv%	1	2	3	4	5	6	7	8	9	10	11
Fianna Fáil	Seán Lemass	31.8	10,211										
Fine Gael	Maurice E. Dockrell	21.8	7,007										
Clann na Poblachta	Joseph Barron	9.7	3,109	3,329	3,442	3,450	3,507	3,749	3,830	3,971	4,142	4,273	4,930
Fianna Fáil	Philip Brady	8.4	2,689	5,282	5,380								
Labour	Frank Cluskey	5.6	1,796	1,904	1,954	1,955	2,031	2,105	2,141	2,241	3,488	3,569	4,052
Labour	James Mooney	4.7	1,511	1,630	1,678	1,679	1,730	1,794	1,847	1,928			
Fianna Fáil	Patrick Cummins	4.5	1,449	2,285	2,317	2,319	2,337	2,374	2,394	2,584	2,672	3,996	4,289
Fine Gael	George McLoughlin	3.4	1,095	1,163	1,371	1,373	1,383	1,399	1,747				
Fianna Fáil	Thomas J. Fitzpatrick	3.2	1,024	1,756	1,800	1,803	1,812	1,851	1,889	1,953	2,018		
Fine Gael	James McGarry	2.4	755	799	1,050	1,052	1,068	1,091					
Sinn Féin	Tomás Ó Dubhghaill	1.9	622	656	664	664	693						
Fine Gael	John Hegarty	1.8	579	661	1,450	1,456	1,470	1,492	1,945	2,910	3,025	3,151	
Irish Workers' Party	Michael O'Riordan	0.9	277	297	308	308							
Electorate: 57,390 Valid: 32,124 Quota: 5,355 Turnout: 56.0%

=== 1958 by-election ===
Independent TD Jack Murphy resigned on 13 May 1958. A by-election was held on 25 June 1958.

1958 by-election: Dublin South-Central
Party	Candidate	FPv%	Count			
Party	Candidate	FPv%	1	2	3	4
Fianna Fáil	Patrick Cummins	34.2	6,014	6,337	7,111	7,988
Fine Gael	John Hegarty	17.6	3,089	3,619	4,386	
Clann na Poblachta	Seán MacBride	17.2	3,030	3,799	4,925	7,083
Labour	Frank Cluskey	15.7	2,762	3,352		
National Progressive Democrats	Noel Hartnett	15.3	2,688			
Electorate: 51,567 Valid: 17,583 Quota: 8,792 Turnout: 34.1%

=== 1957 general election ===
1957 general election: Dublin South-Central
Party	Candidate	FPv%	Count							
Party	Candidate	FPv%	1	2	3	4	5	6	7	8
Fianna Fáil	Seán Lemass	25.5	8,136							
Fine Gael	Maurice E. Dockrell	14.4	4,607	4,663	4,965	5,010	5,058	5,520		
Fianna Fáil	Philip Brady	10.1	3,236	4,382	4,401	4,532	5,133	5,265	5,276	5,642
Independent	Jack Murphy	9.5	3,036	3,109	3,163	3,620	3,728	4,375	4,403	4,992
Fianna Fáil	Celia Lynch	8.5	2,704	3,789	3,853	4,023	5,122	5,333		
Clann na Poblachta	Joseph Barron	6.4	2,049	2,092	2,121	2,553	2,581	3,037	3,055	3,744
Labour	Roddy Connolly	6.1	1,932	1,967	1,998	2,158	2,203			
Fine Gael	Thomas Finlay	6.0	1,906	1,925	2,381	2,405	2,446	2,614	2,755	
Sinn Féin	Tomás Ó Dubhghaill	5.4	1,734	1,760	1,766					
Fianna Fáil	Anthony Moroney	5.1	1,621	1,929	1,937	1,998				
Fine Gael	Edward Hosey	3.0	966	989						
Electorate: 55,976 Valid: 31,927 Quota: 5,322 Turnout: 57.0%

=== 1954 general election ===
1954 general election: Dublin South-Central
Party	Candidate	FPv%	Count									
Party	Candidate	FPv%	1	2	3	4	5	6	7	8	9	10
Fianna Fáil	Seán Lemass	20.1	7,753									
Fine Gael	Maurice E. Dockrell	19.4	7,474									
Labour	James Larkin Jnr	15.3	5,883	5,927	6,003	6,052	6,167	6,413	6,556			
Clann na Poblachta	Joseph Barron	8.5	3,258	3,273	3,318	3,372	3,442	3,584	3,740			
Fianna Fáil	Celia Lynch	7.8	3,009	3,422	3,434	3,452	3,481	3,554	5,026	5,452	5,519	5,846
Fine Gael	Thomas Finlay	6.9	2,654	2,663	3,348	3,429	3,500	5,729	5,815	7,437		
Fine Gael	William Phelan	6.8	2,614	2,625	2,800	2,833	2,878					
Fianna Fáil	Philip Brady	6.8	2,610	2,885	2,907	2,928	2,963	3,014				
Fianna Fáil	John McCann	6.7	2,586	3,143	3,159	3,183	3,204	3,275	4,333	4,756	4,794	5,026
Independent	Eamonn Halpin	1.0	380	386	398	416						
Independent	Seán Davis	0.8	298	301	312							
Electorate: 59,731 Valid: 38,519 Quota: 6,420 Turnout: 64.5%

=== 1951 general election ===
1951 general election: Dublin South-Central
Party	Candidate	FPv%	Count								
Party	Candidate	FPv%	1	2	3	4	5	6	7	8	9
Fianna Fáil	Seán Lemass	25.9	10,759								
Fine Gael	Maurice E. Dockrell	13.7	5,684	5,720	6,301	6,480	7,038				
Labour	James Larkin Jnr	13.6	5,667	5,764	5,928	6,049	6,986				
Fianna Fáil	John McCann	10.8	4,487	6,071	6,112	6,167	6,350	7,025			
Fianna Fáil	Philip Brady	9.7	4,020	4,669	4,703	4,961	5,095	5,688	5,755	5,792	5,831
Fianna Fáil	James B. Lynch	8.8	3,638	5,002	5,042	5,080	5,226	5,667	5,714	5,739	5,801
Fine Gael	Kerry Reddin	6.7	2,784	2,818	3,188	3,239	3,633				
Clann na Poblachta	Con Lehane	4.4	1,809	1,845	1,914	2,596					
Clann na Poblachta	Joseph Barron	3.3	1,363	1,382	1,414						
Fine Gael	Anthony Lalor	3.2	1,332	1,348							
Electorate: 65,020 Valid: 41,543 Quota: 6,924 Turnout: 63.9%

=== 1948 general election ===
1948 general election: Dublin South-Central
Party	Candidate	FPv%	Count											
Party	Candidate	FPv%	1	2	3	4	5	6	7	8	9	10	11	12
Fianna Fáil	Seán Lemass	29.9	13,274											
Fine Gael	Maurice E. Dockrell	11.1	4,931	4,993	5,011	5,294	5,353	5,405	5,440	5,546	9,618			
Clann na Poblachta	Con Lehane	11.0	4,861	4,924	4,975	4,995	5,062	5,469	5,514	7,567				
Labour	James Larkin Jnr	10.7	4,743	4,894	4,978	5,013	5,275	5,363	6,555	6,814	7,070	7,199	8,579	
Fine Gael	Patrick Cahill	8.9	3,965	4,030	4,054	4,289	4,384	4,454	4,504	4,836				
Fianna Fáil	John McCann	8.6	3,829	5,860	5,914	5,948	6,055	6,077	6,104	6,159	6,324	6,346	6,889	7,286
Clann na Poblachta	Joseph Barron	5.2	2,287	2,307	2,328	2,336	2,373	2,918	2,942					
Fianna Fáil	James B. Lynch	5.0	2,216	5,596	5,634	5,645	5,726	5,745	5,799	5,831	5,974	5,992	6,289	6,662
Labour	Frank Foley	2.9	1,303	1,323	1,334	1,340	1,419	1,459						
Clann na Poblachta	Jack Brady	2.7	1,203	1,227	1,241	1,247	1,275							
National Labour Party	Joseph Hughes	1.8	790	817	850	859								
Fine Gael	Joseph Toner	1.4	635	644	658									
Independent	William Naughton	0.8	350	374										
Electorate: 67,633 Valid: 44,387 Quota: 7,398 Turnout: 65.6%

== See also ==
- Elections in the Republic of Ireland
- Politics of the Republic of Ireland
- List of Dáil by-elections
- List of political parties in the Republic of Ireland
