= Gerard Brady =

Irish politician (1936–2020)

Minister for Education
- In office 27 October – 14 December 1982
- Taoiseach: Charles Haughey
- Preceded by: Charles Haughey
- Succeeded by: Gemma Hussey

Minister of State
- Mar.–Oct. 1982: Environment

Teachta Dála
- In office June 1981 – November 1992
- Constituency: Dublin South-East
- In office June 1977 – June 1981
- Constituency: Dublin Rathmines West

Personal details
- Born: 1 July 1936 Dublin, Ireland
- Died: 16 May 2020 (aged 83) Dublin, Ireland
- Party: Fianna Fáil
- Spouse: Antoinette Brady
- Children: 4
- Parent: Philip Brady (father)
- Education: Dublin Institute of Technology

Gerard Brady (1 July 1936 – 16 May 2020) was an Irish Fianna Fáil politician who served as Minister for Education from October to December 1982.

Brady was born in Dublin in 1936. He was educated at St. Mary's College in Rathmines and later at the College of Science and Technology and the College of Pharmacy in the city. Following his graduation he worked as an ophthalmic optician. Brady's first entry into the political scene was at local level when he was elected to Dublin City Council in 1974. At the 1977 general election he was elected to Dáil Éireann at his first attempt, succeeding his father Philip Brady as Fianna Fáil Teachta Dála (TD) for the Dublin Rathmines West constituency. He represented Dublin South-East from 1981 onwards.

He was appointed Minister of State at the Department of the Environment by Charles Haughey in March 1982. Following the resignation of Martin O'Donoghue as Minister for Education on 6 October that year, Haughey chose to make himself acting Minister for three weeks before appointing Brady to the post on 27 October. Less than a month later Fianna Fáil lost the November 1982 general election, and Gemma Hussey became the new Minister for Education on 14 December. Brady's Cabinet tenure is one of the shortest in history. He was reappointed to the opposition frontbench but was not given a ministerial job when the party returned to power in 1987, nor in 1989. He lost his seat at the 1992 general election to party colleague Eoin Ryan, and subsequently retired from political life.

Brady died on 16 May 2020, in Donnybrook, Dublin, aged 82.

== See also ==
- Families in the Oireachtas

Political offices
Preceded by Charles Haughey	Minister for Education; Oct.–Dec. 1982	Succeeded by Gemma Hussey

Dáil	Election	Deputy (Party)	Deputy (Party)	Deputy (Party)
21st	1977	Gerard Brady (FF)	Ben Briscoe (FF)	Richie Ryan (FG)
22nd	1981	Constituency abolished. See Dublin South-Central and Dublin South-East		

Dáil	Election	Deputy (Party)	Deputy (Party)	Deputy (Party)	Deputy (Party)
13th	1948	John A. Costello (FG)	Seán MacEntee (FF)	Noël Browne (CnaP)	3 seats 1948–1981
14th	1951	John A. Costello (FG)	Seán MacEntee (FF)	Noël Browne (Ind.)	3 seats 1948–1981
15th	1954	John A. Costello (FG)	Seán MacEntee (FF)	John O'Donovan (FG)	3 seats 1948–1981
16th	1957	John A. Costello (FG)	Seán MacEntee (FF)	Noël Browne (Ind.)	3 seats 1948–1981
17th	1961	John A. Costello (FG)	Seán MacEntee (FF)	Noël Browne (NPD)	3 seats 1948–1981
18th	1965	John A. Costello (FG)	Seán MacEntee (FF)	Seán Moore (FF)	3 seats 1948–1981
19th	1969	Garret FitzGerald (FG)	Noël Browne (Lab)	Seán Moore (FF)	3 seats 1948–1981
20th	1973	Garret FitzGerald (FG)	Fergus O'Brien (FG)	Seán Moore (FF)	3 seats 1948–1981
21st	1977	Garret FitzGerald (FG)	Ruairi Quinn (Lab)	Seán Moore (FF)	3 seats 1948–1981
22nd	1981	Garret FitzGerald (FG)	Gerard Brady (FF)	Seán Moore (FF)	Richie Ryan (FG)
23rd	1982 (Feb)	Garret FitzGerald (FG)	Gerard Brady (FF)	Ruairi Quinn (Lab)	Alexis FitzGerald Jnr (FG)
24th	1982 (Nov)	Garret FitzGerald (FG)	Gerard Brady (FF)	Ruairi Quinn (Lab)	Joe Doyle (FG)
25th	1987	Garret FitzGerald (FG)	Gerard Brady (FF)	Ruairi Quinn (Lab)	Michael McDowell (PDs)
26th	1989	Garret FitzGerald (FG)	Gerard Brady (FF)	Ruairi Quinn (Lab)	Joe Doyle (FG)
27th	1992	Frances Fitzgerald (FG)	Eoin Ryan Jnr (FF)	Ruairi Quinn (Lab)	Michael McDowell (PDs)
28th	1997	Frances Fitzgerald (FG)	Eoin Ryan Jnr (FF)	Ruairi Quinn (Lab)	John Gormley (GP)
29th	2002	Michael McDowell (PDs)	Eoin Ryan Jnr (FF)	Ruairi Quinn (Lab)	John Gormley (GP)
30th	2007	Lucinda Creighton (FG)	Chris Andrews (FF)	Ruairi Quinn (Lab)	John Gormley (GP)
31st	2011	Lucinda Creighton (FG)	Eoghan Murphy (FG)	Ruairi Quinn (Lab)	Kevin Humphreys (Lab)
32nd	2016	Constituency abolished. See Dublin Bay South.			
