= Catherine Ardagh =

Irish politician (born 1982)

Catherine Ardagh TD
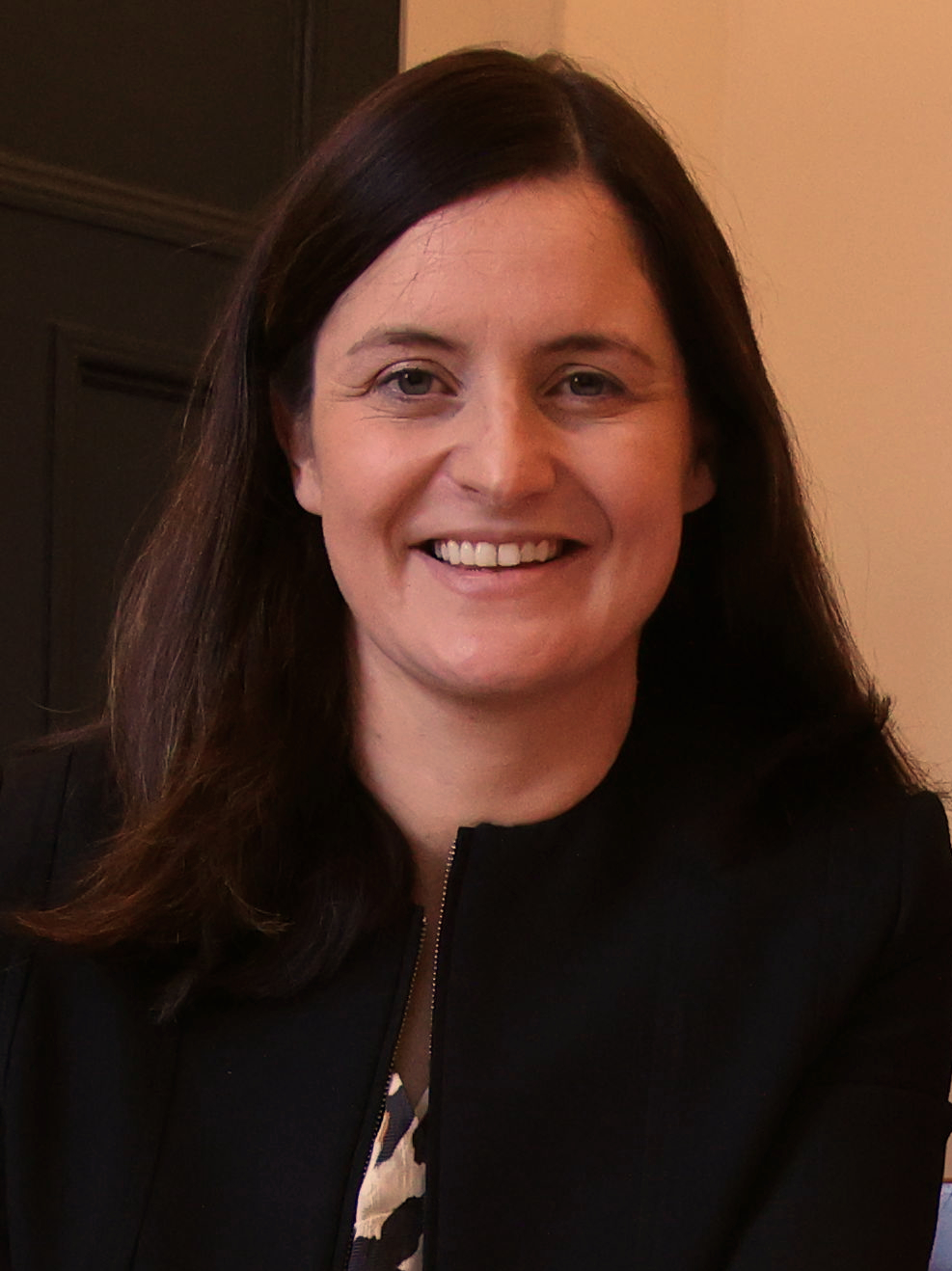
- Ardagh in 2024

Minister of State
- 2026–: Justice, Home Affairs and Migration

Teachta Dála
- Incumbent
- Assumed office November 2024
- Constituency: Dublin South-Central

Leader of Fianna Fáil in the Seanad
- In office 18 May 2016 – 29 June 2020
- Leader: Micheál Martin
- Preceded by: Darragh O'Brien
- Succeeded by: Lisa Chambers

Senator
- In office 8 June 2016 – 1 December 2024
- Constituency: Industrial and Commercial Panel

Personal details
- Born: 20 September 1982 (age 44) Crumlin, Dublin, Ireland
- Party: Fianna Fáil
- Spouse: Darragh McShea (m. 2016)
- Children: 2
- Parent: Seán Ardagh (father)
- Education: SOAS; Trinity College Dublin; King's Inns
- Website: catherineardagh.ie

Catherine Ardagh (born 20 September 1982) is an Irish Fianna Fáil politician who has served as a Minister of State since 2026. She has been a TD for Dublin South-Central since November 2024. She served as a Senator for the Industrial and Commercial Panel from 2016 to 2024 and Leader of Fianna Fáil in the Seanad from 2016 to 2020.

== Political career ==
=== County Councillor ===
Ardagh served as a member of Dublin City Council from 2014 to 2016. In April 2014, she accused Fianna Fáil of "failing women", highlighting that only 17% of its candidates in the 2014 local elections were female—falling below the party's own 33% target. She criticized the party's "macho, rural mindset" and called for measures to encourage female candidates.

=== Senator ===
Ardagh unsuccessfully contested the Dublin South-Central constituency in the 2016 and 2020 general elections. During the 2020 election, she came within 35 votes of securing a seat. She contested the 2020 election 3 weeks after giving birth to her twin sons.

In December 2019, an RTÉ investigation revealed that Ardagh, Fianna Fáil's leader in the Seanad, did not participate in 68 out of 120 voting days where she was recorded as present in Leinster House between June 2016 and July 2019. Ardagh received her full Travel and Accommodation Allowance (TAA), totalling approximately €13,500 from 2016 to 2018, and stated that she contributed to Seanad debates as part of her leadership responsibilities. She attributed her missed votes, to constituency meetings connected to her selection as a general election candidate, despite Senators not officially representing constituencies. Ardagh also noted that her pregnancy and associated medical complications affected her attendance in 2019. When questioned about whether her legal work as a solicitor might explain the missed votes, she declined to comment. She emphasized that she participated in formal votes when required, but added that these votes were less frequent due to the confidence and supply agreement between Fianna Fáil and Fine Gael.

Ardagh was the Fianna Fáil Seanad spokesperson on Social Protection. She was re-elected as a Senator at the 2020 Seanad election.

In February 2021, Catherine Ardagh publicly shared her physical challenges with undergoing five rounds of in vitro fertilization (IVF), which led to the birth of her twin sons. She criticized the high cost of treatment, which she and her husband financed over two and a half years, and advocated for free IVF in public hospitals. In the Seanad, Ardagh called for greater State support for couples facing fertility challenges, advocating for free IVF in public hospitals. She emphasised that many couples cannot afford even a single cycle, often remortgaging homes or delaying major life decisions to cover the costs. She supported changes to the Assisted Human Reproduction Bill 2024 to make this care accessible.

In October 2024, Ardagh stated that her family faced significant challenges securing a school placement for her autistic son. Despite attending an early intervention class at Stratford National School, all plans to transition the class to a junior infants group were denied, leaving her uncertain about his educational future. Ardagh criticized the lack of engagement from the school and highlighted the stress faced by parents of children with disabilities, describing it as deeply isolating. She urged Ireland to adopt a more ambitious approach to special education, emphasising that investment in such services benefits society as a whole.

=== Teachta Dála ===
In July 2024, Ardagh was selected to contest the next general election for Dublin South-Central. At the 2024 general election, Ardagh was elected to the Dáil. She was appointed as Minister of State at the Department of Justice, Home Affairs and Migration on 28 May 2026.

== Political views ==
In 2020 Ardagh advocated for a State-funded crèche system to support working mothers, describing it as a sensible economic and social investment, though it was not included in Fianna Fáil's manifesto.

Ardagh has called herself an opponent of NIMBYism, stating that it must be defeated to address housing shortages. Ardagh believes public services should be prioritised over tax cuts.

== Personal life ==
Ardagh is the daughter of Seán Ardagh, who served as TD for Dublin South-Central from 1997 to 2011. Her mother, Marie, previously served as on South Dublin County Council, representing the Terenure–Rathfarnham LEA. Her brother, Charlie, also served on Dublin City Council, representing the Crumlin–Kimmage area for several years. Ardagh's husband, Darragh McShea, was appointed assistant general secretary of Fianna Fáil in 2016.

Political offices
Preceded by Niall Collins; Colm Brophy	Minister of State at the Department of Justice, Home Affairs and Migration; 2026–present With: Colm Brophy	Incumbent

Dáil	Election	Deputy (Party)	Deputy (Party)	Deputy (Party)	Deputy (Party)	Deputy (Party)
13th	1948	Seán Lemass (FF)	James Larkin Jnr (Lab)	Con Lehane (CnaP)	Maurice E. Dockrell (FG)	John McCann (FF)
14th	1951	Seán Lemass (FF)	James Larkin Jnr (Lab)	Philip Brady (FF)	Maurice E. Dockrell (FG)	John McCann (FF)
15th	1954	Seán Lemass (FF)	James Larkin Jnr (Lab)	Thomas Finlay (FG)	Maurice E. Dockrell (FG)	Celia Lynch (FF)
16th	1957	Seán Lemass (FF)	Jack Murphy (Ind.)	Philip Brady (FF)	Maurice E. Dockrell (FG)	Celia Lynch (FF)
16th	1958 by-election	Seán Lemass (FF)	Patrick Cummins (FF)	Philip Brady (FF)	Maurice E. Dockrell (FG)	Celia Lynch (FF)
17th	1961	Seán Lemass (FF)	Patrick Cummins (FF)	Philip Brady (FF)	Maurice E. Dockrell (FG)	Joseph Barron (CnaP)
18th	1965	Seán Lemass (FF)	Frank Cluskey (Lab)	Philip Brady (FF)	Maurice E. Dockrell (FG)	Thomas J. Fitzpatrick (FF)
19th	1969	Richie Ryan (FG)	Ben Briscoe (FF)	Philip Brady (FF)	John O'Donovan (Lab)	4 seats 1969–1977
20th	1973	Richie Ryan (FG)	Ben Briscoe (FF)	Philip Brady (FF)	John Kelly (FG)	4 seats 1969–1977
21st	1977	Fergus O'Brien (FG)	Frank Cluskey (Lab)	Thomas J. Fitzpatrick (FF)	3 seats 1977–1981	
22nd	1981	Fergus O'Brien (FG)	Ben Briscoe (FF)	Thomas J. Fitzpatrick (FF)	Gay Mitchell (FG)	John O'Connell (Note: O'Connell served as Ceann Comhairle in the 22nd and 23rd Dáil from 1981 to 1983 and was returned automatically at the February 1982 and November 1982 general elections. He joined Fianna Fáil in January 1985.) (Ind.)
23rd	1982 (Feb)	Frank Cluskey (Lab)	Ben Briscoe (FF)	Thomas J. Fitzpatrick (FF)	Gay Mitchell (FG)	John O'Connell (Ind.)
24th	1982 (Nov)	Frank Cluskey (Lab)	Ben Briscoe (FF)	Fergus O'Brien (FG)	Gay Mitchell (FG)	John O'Connell (Ind.)
25th	1987	Frank Cluskey (Lab)	Ben Briscoe (FF)	Fergus O'Brien (FG)	Gay Mitchell (FG)	Mary Mooney (FF)
26th	1989	John O'Connell (FF)	Ben Briscoe (FF)	Fergus O'Brien (FG)	Gay Mitchell (FG)	Eric Byrne (WP)
27th	1992	John O'Connell (FF)	Ben Briscoe (FF)	Pat Upton (Lab)	Gay Mitchell (FG)	4 seats 1992–2002
27th	1994 by-election	Eric Byrne (DL)	Ben Briscoe (FF)	Pat Upton (Lab)	Gay Mitchell (FG)	4 seats 1992–2002
28th	1997	Seán Ardagh (FF)	Ben Briscoe (FF)	Pat Upton (Lab)	Gay Mitchell (FG)	4 seats 1992–2002
28th	1999 by-election	Seán Ardagh (FF)	Ben Briscoe (FF)	Mary Upton (Lab)	Gay Mitchell (FG)	4 seats 1992–2002
29th	2002	Seán Ardagh (FF)	Aengus Ó Snodaigh (SF)	Mary Upton (Lab)	Gay Mitchell (FG)	Michael Mulcahy (FF)
30th	2007	Seán Ardagh (FF)	Aengus Ó Snodaigh (SF)	Mary Upton (Lab)	Catherine Byrne (FG)	Michael Mulcahy (FF)
31st	2011	Eric Byrne (Lab)	Aengus Ó Snodaigh (SF)	Joan Collins (PBP)	Catherine Byrne (FG)	Michael Conaghan (Lab)
32nd	2016	Bríd Smith (AAA–PBP)	Aengus Ó Snodaigh (SF)	Joan Collins (Note: Founded Right to Change in May 2020.) (I4C)	Catherine Byrne (FG)	4 seats from 2016
33rd	2020	Bríd Smith (S–PBP)	Aengus Ó Snodaigh (SF)	Joan Collins (I4C)	Patrick Costello (GP)	4 seats from 2016
34th	2024	Catherine Ardagh (FF)	Aengus Ó Snodaigh (SF)	Máire Devine (SF)	Jen Cummins (SD)	4 seats from 2016
