= Joseph Barron =

Irish politician (died 1968)

- Barron in 1948

Teachta Dála
- In office October 1961 – April 1965
- Constituency: Dublin South-Central

Personal details
- Born: Dublin, Ireland
- Died: 30 July 1968 Dublin, Ireland
- Party: Clann na Poblachta

Joseph Barron (died 30 July 1968) was an Irish Clann na Poblachta politician. A teacher by profession, he first stood unsuccessfully for election at the 1948 general election as a Clann na Poblachta candidate for the Dublin South-Central constituency. He was also an unsuccessful candidate at the 1951, 1954 and 1957 general elections.

He was elected to Dáil Éireann at the 1961 general election as a Clann na Poblachta Teachta Dála (TD) for the Dublin South-Central constituency.

The leader of Clann na Poblachta, Seán MacBride, lost his seat at the 1961 election, and Barron became the leader and sole member of the Clann na Poblachta parliamentary party. He lost his seat at the 1965 general election.

| Dáil | Election | Deputy (Party) | Deputy (Party) | Deputy (Party) | Deputy (Party) | Deputy (Party) |
|---|---|---|---|---|---|---|
| 13th | 1948 | Seán Lemass (FF) | James Larkin Jnr (Lab) | Con Lehane (CnaP) | Maurice E. Dockrell (FG) | John McCann (FF) |
| 14th | 1951 | Seán Lemass (FF) | James Larkin Jnr (Lab) | Philip Brady (FF) | Maurice E. Dockrell (FG) | John McCann (FF) |
| 15th | 1954 | Seán Lemass (FF) | James Larkin Jnr (Lab) | Thomas Finlay (FG) | Maurice E. Dockrell (FG) | Celia Lynch (FF) |
| 16th | 1957 | Seán Lemass (FF) | Jack Murphy (Ind.) | Philip Brady (FF) | Maurice E. Dockrell (FG) | Celia Lynch (FF) |
| 16th | 1958 by-election | Seán Lemass (FF) | Patrick Cummins (FF) | Philip Brady (FF) | Maurice E. Dockrell (FG) | Celia Lynch (FF) |
| 17th | 1961 | Seán Lemass (FF) | Patrick Cummins (FF) | Philip Brady (FF) | Maurice E. Dockrell (FG) | Joseph Barron (CnaP) |
| 18th | 1965 | Seán Lemass (FF) | Frank Cluskey (Lab) | Philip Brady (FF) | Maurice E. Dockrell (FG) | Thomas J. Fitzpatrick (FF) |
| 19th | 1969 | Richie Ryan (FG) | Ben Briscoe (FF) | Philip Brady (FF) | John O'Donovan (Lab) | 4 seats 1969–1977 |
| 20th | 1973 | Richie Ryan (FG) | Ben Briscoe (FF) | Philip Brady (FF) | John Kelly (FG) | 4 seats 1969–1977 |
| 21st | 1977 | Fergus O'Brien (FG) | Frank Cluskey (Lab) | Thomas J. Fitzpatrick (FF) | 3 seats 1977–1981 | |
| 22nd | 1981 | Fergus O'Brien (FG) | Ben Briscoe (FF) | Thomas J. Fitzpatrick (FF) | Gay Mitchell (FG) | John O'Connell (Note: O'Connell served as Ceann Comhairle in the 22nd and 23rd Dáil from 1981 to 1983 and was returned automatically at the February 1982 and November 1982 general elections. He joined Fianna Fáil in January 1985.) (Ind.) |
| 23rd | 1982 (Feb) | Frank Cluskey (Lab) | Ben Briscoe (FF) | Thomas J. Fitzpatrick (FF) | Gay Mitchell (FG) | John O'Connell (Ind.) |
| 24th | 1982 (Nov) | Frank Cluskey (Lab) | Ben Briscoe (FF) | Fergus O'Brien (FG) | Gay Mitchell (FG) | John O'Connell (Ind.) |
| 25th | 1987 | Frank Cluskey (Lab) | Ben Briscoe (FF) | Fergus O'Brien (FG) | Gay Mitchell (FG) | Mary Mooney (FF) |
| 26th | 1989 | John O'Connell (FF) | Ben Briscoe (FF) | Fergus O'Brien (FG) | Gay Mitchell (FG) | Eric Byrne (WP) |
| 27th | 1992 | John O'Connell (FF) | Ben Briscoe (FF) | Pat Upton (Lab) | Gay Mitchell (FG) | 4 seats 1992–2002 |
| 27th | 1994 by-election | Eric Byrne (DL) | Ben Briscoe (FF) | Pat Upton (Lab) | Gay Mitchell (FG) | 4 seats 1992–2002 |
| 28th | 1997 | Seán Ardagh (FF) | Ben Briscoe (FF) | Pat Upton (Lab) | Gay Mitchell (FG) | 4 seats 1992–2002 |
| 28th | 1999 by-election | Seán Ardagh (FF) | Ben Briscoe (FF) | Mary Upton (Lab) | Gay Mitchell (FG) | 4 seats 1992–2002 |
| 29th | 2002 | Seán Ardagh (FF) | Aengus Ó Snodaigh (SF) | Mary Upton (Lab) | Gay Mitchell (FG) | Michael Mulcahy (FF) |
| 30th | 2007 | Seán Ardagh (FF) | Aengus Ó Snodaigh (SF) | Mary Upton (Lab) | Catherine Byrne (FG) | Michael Mulcahy (FF) |
| 31st | 2011 | Eric Byrne (Lab) | Aengus Ó Snodaigh (SF) | Joan Collins (PBP) | Catherine Byrne (FG) | Michael Conaghan (Lab) |
| 32nd | 2016 | Bríd Smith (AAA–PBP) | Aengus Ó Snodaigh (SF) | Joan Collins (Note: Founded Right to Change in May 2020.) (I4C) | Catherine Byrne (FG) | 4 seats from 2016 |
| 33rd | 2020 | Bríd Smith (S–PBP) | Aengus Ó Snodaigh (SF) | Joan Collins (I4C) | Patrick Costello (GP) | 4 seats from 2016 |
| 34th | 2024 | Catherine Ardagh (FF) | Aengus Ó Snodaigh (SF) | Máire Devine (SF) | Jen Cummins (SD) | 4 seats from 2016 |
