= Dublin Rathmines West =

Dáil constituency (1977–1981)

Coordinates: 53°19′19.1″N 6°16′29.9″W

- Former Dáil constituency

Former constituency
- Created: 1977
- Abolished: 1981
- Seats: 3
- Local government area: Dublin City
- Created from: Dublin South-Central
- Replaced by: Dublin South-Central; Dublin South-East

Dublin Rathmines West was a parliamentary constituency represented in Dáil Éireann, the lower house of the Irish parliament or Oireachtas from 1977 to 1981. The constituency elected 3 deputies (Teachtaí Dála, commonly known as TDs) to the Dáil, using proportional representation by means of the single transferable vote (PR-STV).

== History ==
The constituency was used at the 1977 general election, under the Electoral (Amendment) Act 1974, largely with territory transferred from Dublin South-Central, as part of the redistribution of constituencies which attempted to secure the re-election of the outgoing Fine Gael–Labour Party government.

The constituency was abolished under the Electoral (Amendment) Act 1980, which came into effect at the 1981 general election. It was mostly transferred to Dublin South-Central although a smaller part went to Dublin South-East.

Its election was notable as the first time that Mary Robinson (later 8th President of Ireland), stood for the Dáil, though she was unsuccessful.

== Boundaries ==
The constituency covered the Rathmines district of South-East Dublin and adjoining areas. It consisted of the following wards of the county borough of Dublin: Crumlin D, Kimmage A, Kimmage B, Kimmage C, Kimmage D, Kimmage E, Rathfarnham A, Rathmines West A, Rathmines West B, Rathmines West D, Rathmines West E, Rathmines West F, Terenure A, Terenure B, Terenure C.

== TDs ==
Teachtaí Dála (TDs) for Dublin Rathmines West 1977–1981
Key to parties: FF = Fianna Fáil; FG = Fine Gael
Dáil	Election	Deputy (Party)	Deputy (Party)	Deputy (Party)
21st	1977	Gerard Brady (FF)	Ben Briscoe (FF)	Richie Ryan (FG)
22nd	1981	Constituency abolished. See Dublin South-Central and Dublin South-East		

Note: The columns in this table are used only for presentational purposes, and no significance should be attached to the order of columns. For details of the order in which seats were won at each election, see the detailed results of that election.

== 1977 general election ==
*: Outgoing TD

1977 general election: Dublin Rathmines West
Party	Candidate	FPv%	Count							
Party	Candidate	FPv%	1	2	3	4	5	6	7	8
Fianna Fáil	Gerard Brady	22.7	6,064	6,596	6,824					
Fine Gael	Richie Ryan	20.5	5,486	5,499	5,532	5,534	5,924	7,301		
Fianna Fáil	Ben Briscoe	19.2	5,149	5,633	5,805	5,909	5,945	6,070	6,186	6,488
Labour	Mary Robinson	10.7	2,854	2,909	3,173	3,183	3,285	3,544	3,752	6,082
Labour	Michael Collins	8.9	2,377	2,383	2,674	2,682	2,739	2,961	3,294	
Fine Gael	James O'Keeffe	4.9	1,311	1,315	1,351	1,355	2,054			
Fine Gael	Seán Kelly	4.7	1,258	1,265	1,291	1,293				
Sinn Féin The Workers' Party	Eric Byrne	4.3	1,148	1,166						
Fianna Fáil	Nóirín Slattery	4.2	1,126							
Electorate: 41,679 Valid: 26,773 Quota: 6,694 Turnout: 64.1%

== See also ==
- Dáil constituencies
- Politics of the Republic of Ireland
- Historic Dáil constituencies
- Elections in the Republic of Ireland
