= Aengus Ó Snodaigh =

Irish politician (born 1964)

Aengus Ó Snodaigh TD
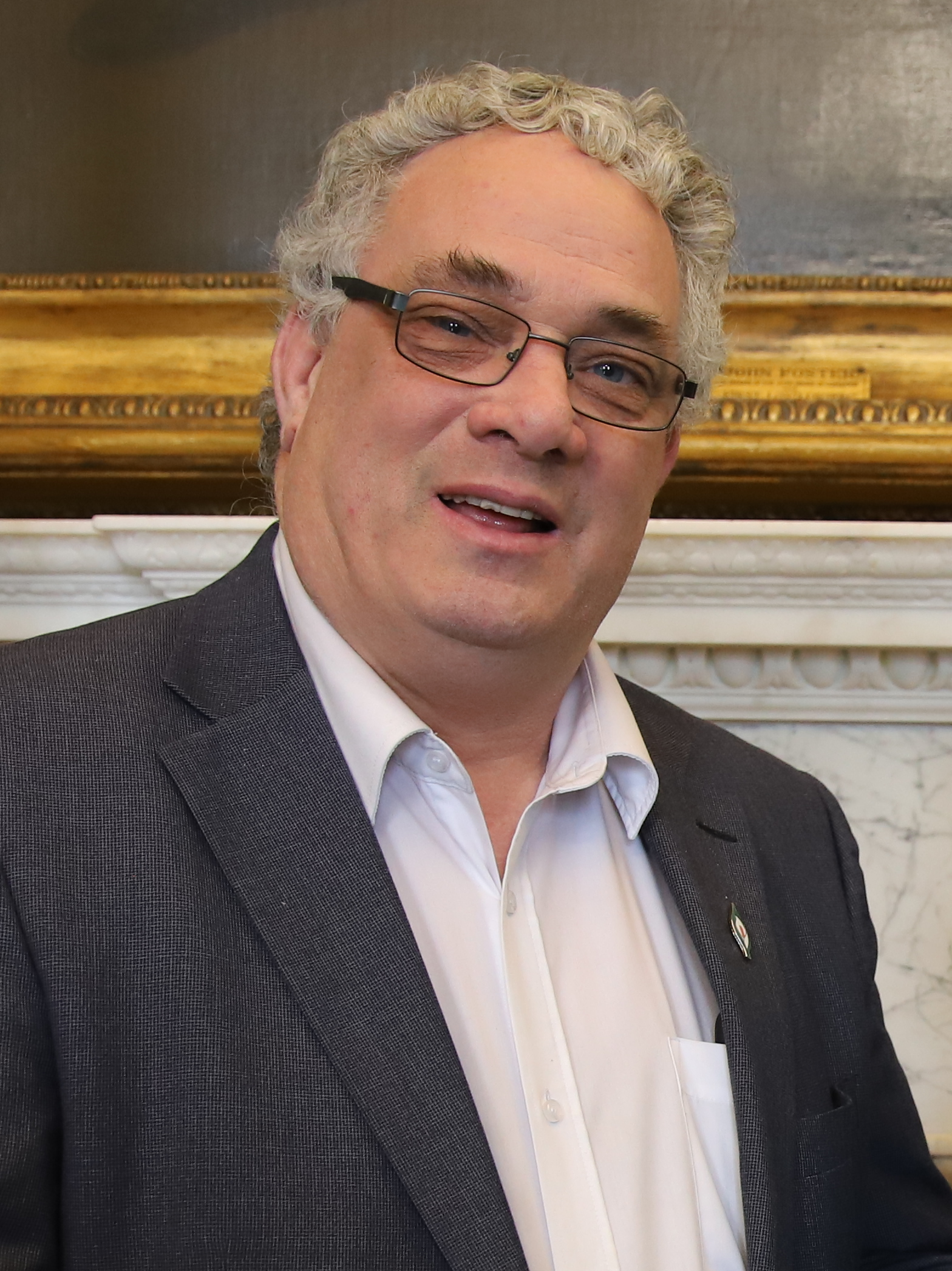
- Ó Snodaigh in 2024

Teachta Dála
- Incumbent
- Assumed office May 2002
- Constituency: Dublin South-Central

Personal details
- Born: 31 July 1964 (age 62) Dublin, Ireland
- Party: Sinn Féin
- Spouse: Aisling Ní Dálaigh (m. 1992)
- Children: 3
- Parents: Pádraig Ó Snodaigh (father); Cliodhna Cussen (mother)
- Education: University College Dublin

Aengus Ó Snodaigh (pronounced [ˈeːŋɡəsˠ oː ˈsˠn̪ˠɔd̪ˠiː]; born 31 July 1964) is an Irish Sinn Féin politician, author and historian who has been a Teachta Dála (TD) for the Dublin South-Central constituency since the 2002 general election.

== Early and personal life ==
A Dubliner and Irish language speaker, he attended school at Scoil Lorcáin and Coláiste Eoin, before studying at University College Dublin (UCD). Ó Snodaigh joined Sinn Féin while at university, where he was active in student politics, in 1983. He completed a Bachelor of Arts in History and Geography, and a Higher Diploma in Education. Having secured his teaching qualifications, he went on to teach at secondary level and as a literacy teacher in Dublin's inner city.

He is also the editor of Fealsúnacht, Feall agus Fuil which is a collection of historical essays concentrating on the 1798 Rebellion and several pamphlets on aspects of Irish republican history. He is a member of the board of the Ireland Institute, aimed at promoting discussion on Irish republicanism, culture and heritage which restored the Pearse brothers' birthplace and original family home at 27 Pearse Street, Dublin, and joint editor of the institute's journal, The Republic. Ó Snodaigh is the brother of the three Ó Snodaigh brothers in the band Kíla, and is the son of the writer and publisher Pádraig Ó Snodaigh and the sculptor Cliodhna Cussen from Newcastlewest, County Limerick. He is married to Aisling Ní Dhálaigh; they live in Bluebell with their three children. He also worked as a journalist, book reviewer and proofreader for An Phoblacht newspaper. In one incident a book-bomb was sent to the office by Ulster loyalist paramilitaries and he carried the device outside the building, where it exploded a short time later, injuring two soldiers.

== Political career ==
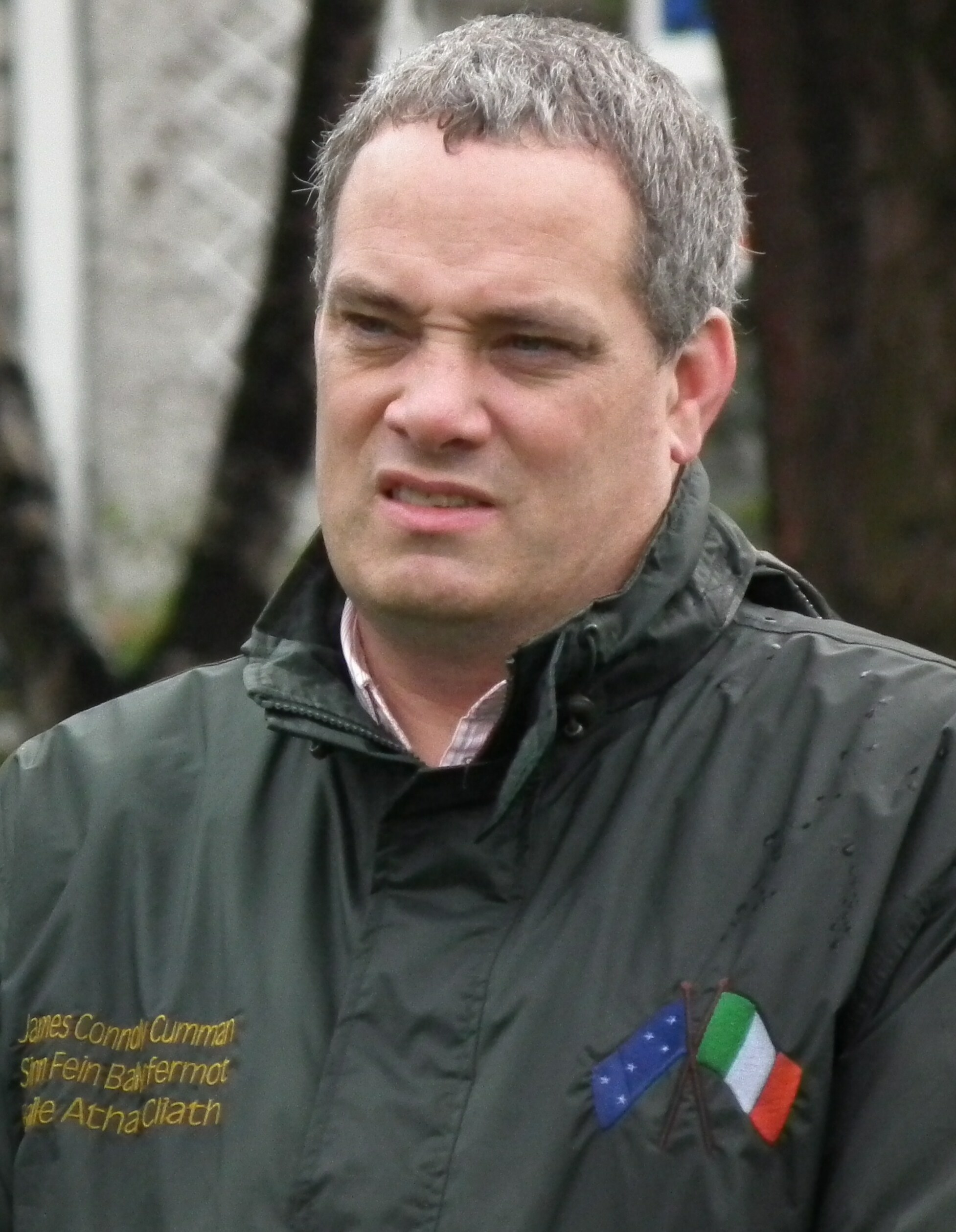
Ó Snodaigh in 2009

He was first elected to Dáil Éireann at the 2002 general election, having earlier contested the Dublin South-East constituency at the 1987 general election, and a by-election in the Dublin South-Central constituency in 1999. Seven of Ó Snodaigh's election workers were jailed for IRA membership in 2004. This included two men arrested in connection with an alleged espionage ring at Leinster House, who worked in Ó Snodaigh's office. Ó Snodaigh criticised the non-jury Special Criminal Court that they were tried in.

He is the party Spokesperson on Irish, the Gaeltacht, Arts and Culture. He was previously the Sinn Féin party whip in the Dáil, the Sinn Féin representative on the National Forum on Europe and the party's spokesperson on the Treaty of Nice. He was a member of the Dáil Committee on Procedures and Privileges and the Committee on European Affairs in the 29th Dáil. He was re-elected at the 2007 general election. He has been a member of the Sinn Féin national executive, the Ard Chomhairle, for many years, has been on the Dublin executive of the party since 1985, and was part of the party's negotiations team during the Northern Ireland peace process.

=== Electoral results ===
Elections to the Dáil
Party	Election		FPv	FPv%	Result
Sinn Féin	Dublin South-East	1987	811	2.1	Eliminated on count 6/15
Sinn Féin	Dublin South-Central	1999	1,686	8.4	Eliminated on count 6/8
Sinn Féin	Dublin South-Central	2002	5,591	12.7	Elected on count 11/11
Sinn Féin	Dublin South-Central	2007	4,825	10.2	Elected on count 10/10
Sinn Féin	Dublin South-Central	2011	6,804	13.4	Elected on count 13/13
Sinn Féin	Dublin South-Central	2016	6,639	15.5	Elected on count 7/11
Sinn Féin	Dublin South-Central	2020	17,015	39.3	Elected on count 1/6
Sinn Féin	Dublin South-Central	2024	4,497	12.0	Elected on count 15/15

== Political views ==
=== Palestine ===
Ó Snodaigh is a well-known supporter of the Palestinian cause, and has in the past been highly critical of the actions of Israel.

During the 2009 Gaza–Israel conflict, Ó Snodaigh said that Alan Shatter, a Fine Gael TD, and the Israeli ambassador to Ireland had exposed the Oireachtas committee on Foreign Affairs to "propaganda, twisted logic and half truths". He also said that Joseph Goebbels, the Nazi propaganda minister, would have been proud of it. The Israeli ambassador to Ireland, Zion Evrony, labelled Ó Snodaigh's comments as "outrageous" and asked for an apology, which Ó Snodaigh refused. Shatter, the only Jewish member of the Dáil, said he was appalled by Ó Snodaigh's mindset that he would liken a Jewish politician to a Nazi minister. Fine Gael leader Enda Kenny demanded a retraction and described Ó Snodaigh's attack on Shatter as "despicable and outrageous". European Affairs Minister Dick Roche, a Fianna Fáil TD, said Ó Snodaigh's statement was "sickening and calculated to offend" and "the fact that Ó Snodaigh made his remarks in the period immediately before the National Holocaust Memorial Day makes his actions doubly reprehensible."

On 30 May 2010, he was one of three Irish politicians who were prevented from leaving Cyprus by authorities to join an international flotilla carrying aid to the blockaded Gaza Strip. In March 2011, Ó Snodaigh set off on another flotilla to Gaza. One of his shipmates was former TD and then-member of Fianna Fáil Chris Andrews, who later joined Sinn Féin.

=== Expenses controversy ===
It was reported in February 2012 that Ó Snodaigh's office had used €50,000 worth of ink cartridges from the Oireachtas between 2007 and 2008.

== Published works ==
- The Republic: Culture in the Republic (with Finbar Cullen) Ireland Institute, 2005 ISBN 9781904820017
- The Rotunda: Birthplace of the Irish Volunteers, Republican Publications, 2013 ISBN 9781782801832

Dáil	Election	Deputy (Party)	Deputy (Party)	Deputy (Party)	Deputy (Party)	Deputy (Party)
13th	1948	Seán Lemass (FF)	James Larkin Jnr (Lab)	Con Lehane (CnaP)	Maurice E. Dockrell (FG)	John McCann (FF)
14th	1951	Seán Lemass (FF)	James Larkin Jnr (Lab)	Philip Brady (FF)	Maurice E. Dockrell (FG)	John McCann (FF)
15th	1954	Seán Lemass (FF)	James Larkin Jnr (Lab)	Thomas Finlay (FG)	Maurice E. Dockrell (FG)	Celia Lynch (FF)
16th	1957	Seán Lemass (FF)	Jack Murphy (Ind.)	Philip Brady (FF)	Maurice E. Dockrell (FG)	Celia Lynch (FF)
16th	1958 by-election	Seán Lemass (FF)	Patrick Cummins (FF)	Philip Brady (FF)	Maurice E. Dockrell (FG)	Celia Lynch (FF)
17th	1961	Seán Lemass (FF)	Patrick Cummins (FF)	Philip Brady (FF)	Maurice E. Dockrell (FG)	Joseph Barron (CnaP)
18th	1965	Seán Lemass (FF)	Frank Cluskey (Lab)	Philip Brady (FF)	Maurice E. Dockrell (FG)	Thomas J. Fitzpatrick (FF)
19th	1969	Richie Ryan (FG)	Ben Briscoe (FF)	Philip Brady (FF)	John O'Donovan (Lab)	4 seats 1969–1977
20th	1973	Richie Ryan (FG)	Ben Briscoe (FF)	Philip Brady (FF)	John Kelly (FG)	4 seats 1969–1977
21st	1977	Fergus O'Brien (FG)	Frank Cluskey (Lab)	Thomas J. Fitzpatrick (FF)	3 seats 1977–1981	
22nd	1981	Fergus O'Brien (FG)	Ben Briscoe (FF)	Thomas J. Fitzpatrick (FF)	Gay Mitchell (FG)	John O'Connell (Note: O'Connell served as Ceann Comhairle in the 22nd and 23rd Dáil from 1981 to 1983 and was returned automatically at the February 1982 and November 1982 general elections. He joined Fianna Fáil in January 1985.) (Ind.)
23rd	1982 (Feb)	Frank Cluskey (Lab)	Ben Briscoe (FF)	Thomas J. Fitzpatrick (FF)	Gay Mitchell (FG)	John O'Connell (Ind.)
24th	1982 (Nov)	Frank Cluskey (Lab)	Ben Briscoe (FF)	Fergus O'Brien (FG)	Gay Mitchell (FG)	John O'Connell (Ind.)
25th	1987	Frank Cluskey (Lab)	Ben Briscoe (FF)	Fergus O'Brien (FG)	Gay Mitchell (FG)	Mary Mooney (FF)
26th	1989	John O'Connell (FF)	Ben Briscoe (FF)	Fergus O'Brien (FG)	Gay Mitchell (FG)	Eric Byrne (WP)
27th	1992	John O'Connell (FF)	Ben Briscoe (FF)	Pat Upton (Lab)	Gay Mitchell (FG)	4 seats 1992–2002
27th	1994 by-election	Eric Byrne (DL)	Ben Briscoe (FF)	Pat Upton (Lab)	Gay Mitchell (FG)	4 seats 1992–2002
28th	1997	Seán Ardagh (FF)	Ben Briscoe (FF)	Pat Upton (Lab)	Gay Mitchell (FG)	4 seats 1992–2002
28th	1999 by-election	Seán Ardagh (FF)	Ben Briscoe (FF)	Mary Upton (Lab)	Gay Mitchell (FG)	4 seats 1992–2002
29th	2002	Seán Ardagh (FF)	Aengus Ó Snodaigh (SF)	Mary Upton (Lab)	Gay Mitchell (FG)	Michael Mulcahy (FF)
30th	2007	Seán Ardagh (FF)	Aengus Ó Snodaigh (SF)	Mary Upton (Lab)	Catherine Byrne (FG)	Michael Mulcahy (FF)
31st	2011	Eric Byrne (Lab)	Aengus Ó Snodaigh (SF)	Joan Collins (PBP)	Catherine Byrne (FG)	Michael Conaghan (Lab)
32nd	2016	Bríd Smith (AAA–PBP)	Aengus Ó Snodaigh (SF)	Joan Collins (Note: Founded Right to Change in May 2020.) (I4C)	Catherine Byrne (FG)	4 seats from 2016
33rd	2020	Bríd Smith (S–PBP)	Aengus Ó Snodaigh (SF)	Joan Collins (I4C)	Patrick Costello (GP)	4 seats from 2016
34th	2024	Catherine Ardagh (FF)	Aengus Ó Snodaigh (SF)	Máire Devine (SF)	Jen Cummins (SD)	4 seats from 2016
