= 1999 Dublin Corporation election =

Part of the 1999 Irish local elections

- 10 June 1999

All 52 seats to Dublin City Council
	First party	Second party	Third party
Party	Fianna Fáil	Labour	Fine Gael
Seats won	20	14	9
Seat change	0	▲4	▲3
	Fourth party	Fifth party	Sixth party
Party	Sinn Féin	Green	Independent
Seats won	4	2	3
Seat change	▲3	▼2	▼2
	Seventh party	Eighth party
Party	Progressive Democrats	Workers' Party
Seats won	0	0
Seat change	▼1	▼5
- Map showing the area of Dublin City Council
Council control before election
Fianna Fáil
Workers Party
Council control after election
Labour Party
Fine Gael
Green Party

An election to Dublin City Council took place on 10 June 1999 as part of that year's Irish local elections. 52 councillors were elected from thirteen local electoral areas on the system of proportional representation by means of the single transferable vote (PR-STV) for a five-year term of office.

== Results by party ==
Party	Seats	±	First Pref. votes	FPv%	±%
Fianna Fáil	20	0	42,928	34.67	
Labour	14	▲4	21,886	17.68	
Fine Gael	9	▲3	22,089	17.84	
Sinn Féin	4	▲3	9,717	7.85	
Green	2	▼2	9,515	7.68	
Progressive Democrats	0	▼1	3,039	2.45	
Workers' Party	0	▼5	2,316	1.87	
Socialist Workers	0	0	523	0.42	
Natural Law	0	0	224	0.18	
Independent	3	▼2	11,586	9.36	
Totals	52	0	123,823	100.00	—

== Results by local electoral area ==
=== Artane ===
Artane - 4 seats
Party	Candidate	FPv%	Count						
Party	Candidate	FPv%	1	2	3	4	5	6	7
Fianna Fáil	Seán Haughey TD*	24.20	2,134						
Sinn Féin	Larry O'Toole	16.85	1,486	1,510	1,533	1,558	1,608	1,657	1,706
Fine Gael	Richard Bruton TD	16.69	1,472	1,518	1,527	1,596	1,644	1,726	2,000
Labour	Anthony Creevey*	13.37	1,179	1,195	1,209	1,238	1,307	1,369	1,805
Labour	Paddy Bourke*	9.51	839	854	863	880	942	974	
Fianna Fáil	Brian Taylor	6.56	579	676	677	709	719	1,100	1,198
Fianna Fáil	Ita Green*	5.18	457	614	616	644	672		
Green	Sieneke Hakvoort	3.42	302	307	328	378			
Independent	Austin McCoy	1.96	173	177	183				
Independent	Brian Sheehan	1.15	101	104	113				
Socialist Workers	Ritchie Browne	1.11	98	100					
Electorate: 27,407 Valid: 8,820 (32.18%) Spoilt: 125 Quota: 1,765 Turnout: 8,945 (32.64%)

=== Ballyfermot ===
Ballyfermot - 3 seats
Party	Candidate	FPv%	Count				
Party	Candidate	FPv%	1	2	3	4	5
Labour	Michael Conaghan*	25.05	1,369				
Independent	Vincent Jackson*	23.92	1,307	1,400			
Fianna Fáil	Marian McGennis TD	17.19	939	952	969	1,246	1,366
Fine Gael	Tom Kavanagh	11.42	624	644	679	725	920
Workers' Party	Linda Kavanagh*	8.47	463	482	565	588	
Fianna Fáil	John Martin	6.84	374	382	404		
Green	Selina Bonnie	3.73	204	218			
Independent	Helen Doyle	3.37	184				
Electorate: 19,539 Valid: 5,464 (27.96%) Spoilt: 117 Quota: 1,367 Turnout: 5,581 (28.56%)

=== Ballymun-Whitehall ===
Ballymun-Whitehall - 3 seats
Party	Candidate	FPv%	Count					
Party	Candidate	FPv%	1	2	3	4	5	6
Fianna Fáil	Noel Ahern TD*	33.30	2,093					
Fianna Fáil	Deirdre Heney	16.20	1,018	1,417	1,443	1,503	1,577	
Fine Gael	Michael Nugent	14.56	915	951	959	1,007	1,084	1,172
Labour	Eamonn O'Brien*	10.96	689	713	739	908	1,031	1,460
Workers' Party	Seán Ó Cionnaith*	9.72	611	629	663	703	800	
Green	Eugene O'Brien	6.33	398	411	469	514		
Labour	Una Ryan	5.62	353	368	388			
Independent	T.J. Fay	2.21	139	153				
Socialist Workers	Kevin Wingfield	1.10	69	71				
Electorate: 19,425 Valid: 6,285 (32.36%) Spoilt: 123 Quota: 1,572 Turnout: 6,408 (32.99%)

=== Cabra-Glasnevin ===
Cabra-Glasnevin - 5 seats
Party	Candidate	FPv%	Count						
Party	Candidate	FPv%	1	2	3	4	5	6	7
Fianna Fáil	Maurice Ahern	17.59	2,421						
Sinn Féin	Nicky Kehoe	17.29	2,380						
Fianna Fáil	Dermot Fitzpatrick*	12.76	1,757	1,825	1,842	1,936	2,090	2,244	2,308
Labour	Brendan Carr	12.72	1,751	1,758	1,772	1,790	1,950	2,608	
Fianna Fáil	John Stephens	10.27	1,413	1,432	1,441	1,544	1,652	1,812	1,857
Green	Thomas Simpson	9.54	1,313	1,319	1,339	1,383	1,545		
Fine Gael	Chris Giblin	9.12	1,256	1,262	1,263	1,292	1,767	1,993	2,197
Fine Gael	John Kearney*	5.56	766	769	785	819			
Progressive Democrats	Desmond Gibney	2.66	366	368	370	378			
Fianna Fáil	Ray Nash	2.48	342	357	363				
Electorate: 33,842 Valid: 13,765 (40.67%) Spoilt: 227 Quota: 2,295 Turnout: 13,992 (41.35%)

=== Clontarf ===
Clontarf - 5 seats
Party	Candidate	FPv%	Count							
Party	Candidate	FPv%	1	2	3	4	5	6	7	8
Fianna Fáil	Ivor Callely TD*	29.99	4,559							
Independent	Finian McGrath	12.24	1,861	1,958	2,013	2,065	2,110	2,207	2,549	
Independent	Dennis McIntyre	8.83	1,342	1,431	1,432	1,455	1,512	1,559	1,670	1,926
Fine Gael	Gerry Breen	8.74	1,329	1,421	1,437	1,451	2,027	2,071	2,188	2,569
Labour	Derek McDowell TD*	7.93	1,205	1,313	1,558	1,601	1,662	1,723	1,997	2,279
Progressive Democrats	Ronan Garvey	6.97	1,060	1,157	1,186	1,217	1,263	1,320	1,408	
Green	Bronwen Maher	6.43	978	1,044	1,105	1,133	1,172	1,227		
Fianna Fáil	John Stafford*	5.70	867	1,383	1,399	1,657	1,705	2,271	2,362	2,576
Fine Gael	Tom Halligan	5.62	855	921	931	940				
Labour	Padraig de Burca	2.97	451	487						
Fianna Fáil	Stephen Egan	2.42	368	828	846	1,079	1,106			
Fianna Fáil	Paddy Hayden	2.14	326	724	737					
Electorate: 37,394 Valid: 15,201 (40.65%) Spoilt: 179 Quota: 2,534 Turnout: 15,380 (41.13%)

=== Crumlin-Kimmage ===
Crumlin-Kimmage - 5 seats
Party	Candidate	FPv%	Count								
Party	Candidate	FPv%	1	2	3	4	5	6	7	8	9
Fine Gael	Gay Mitchell TD	24.97	3,402								
Labour	Eric Byrne*	12.95	1,764	1,909	1,975	2,076	2,291				
Fianna Fáil	Michael Mulcahy*	12.72	1,733	1,829	1,842	1,885	1,932	2,265	2,266	2,325	
Fianna Fáil	Seán Ardagh TD	12.05	1,642	1,725	1,733	1,809	1,851	2,024	2,026	2,086	2,293
Sinn Féin	Brian Kenna	7.00	953	981	1,039	1,055	1,075	1,092	1,093	1,147	
Fine Gael	Ruairi McGinley*	6.75	919	1,494	1,511	1,616	1,670	1,693	1,695	1,823	1,914
Green	John Goodwillie	6.36	867	912	976	1,041	1,074	1,091	1,093	1,259	1,651
Fianna Fáil	Derek Mooney	3.95	538	585	590	626	635				
Labour	Audrey Goggins	3.81	519	543	566	607	693	710	722		
Labour	Liam Herrity	3.57	487	522	540	549					
Progressive Democrats	Mary Ainscough	3.57	486	522	527						
Workers' Party	Shay Kelly	2.30	314	331							
Electorate: 40,588 Valid: 13,624 (33.57%) Spoilt: 266 Quota: 2,271 Turnout: 13,890 (34.22%)

=== Donaghmede ===
Donaghmede - 5 seats
Party	Candidate	FPv%	Count						
Party	Candidate	FPv%	1	2	3	4	5	6	7
Fianna Fáil	Martin Brady TD*	21.20	2,723						
Fianna Fáil	Senator Liam Fitzgerald*	17.87	2,295						
Labour	Seán Kenny*	15.27	1,961	2,026	2,052	2,096	2,143		
Labour	Tommy Broughan TD*	12.43	1,596	1,688	1,706	1,734	1,772	1,898	2,365
Fine Gael	Niamh Cosgrave	10.05	1,291	1,331	1,342	1,478	1,523	1,610	1,850
Green	Donna Cooney*	7.50	963	994	1,000	1,006	1,036	1,216	
Fianna Fáil	John Clare	6.12	786	1,026	1,084	1,092	1,374	1,457	1,597
Independent	Aidan Kennedy	4.43	569	581	584	593	610		
Fianna Fáil	Eddie Guyett	3.25	417	514	544	550			
Fine Gael	Patrick Cummins	1.90	244	249	251				
Electorate: 37,794 Valid: 12,845 (33.99%) Spoilt: 179 Quota: 2,141 Turnout: 13,024 (34.46%)

=== Finglas ===
Finglas - 4 seats
Party	Candidate	FPv%	Count								
Party	Candidate	FPv%	1	2	3	4	5	6	7	8	9
Fianna Fáil	Pat Carey TD*	25.86	2,771								
Sinn Féin	Dessie Ellis	21.26	2,278								
Labour	Róisín Shortall TD*	14.66	1,571	1,671	1,694	1,730	1,817	1,948	2,017	2,492	
Fine Gael	Brendan Brady*	10.98	1,177	1,238	1,250	1,269	1,296	1,333	1,388	1,639	1,826
Independent	Bill Tormey	9.90	1,061	1,113	1,132	1,160	1,196	1,286	1,321		
Fianna Fáil	Tony Taaffe*	8.18	877	1,093	1,116	1,134	1,159	1,195	1,459	1,785	1,894
Fianna Fáil	Dalgan Kirwan	2.64	283	423	430	441	459	476			
Green	Alison Larkin	2.59	278	300	315	352	408				
Workers' Party	John Dunne	2.41	258	277	297	315					
Natural Law	Billy Keegan	1.50	161	178	193						
Electorate: 28,140 Valid: 10,715 (38.08%) Spoilt: 185 Quota: 2,144 Turnout: 10,900 (38.73%)

=== North Inner City ===
North Inner City - 5 seats
Party	Candidate	FPv%	Count										
Party	Candidate	FPv%	1	2	3	4	5	6	7	8	9	10	11
Independent	Tony Gregory TD*	36.27	3,394										
Labour	Senator Joe Costello*	12.39	1,159	1,696									
Sinn Féin	Christy Burke*	11.18	1,112	1,462	1,495	1,502	1,525	1,548	1,598				
Fianna Fáil	Royston Brady	10.04	939	1,088	1,100	1,103	1,113	1,120	1,128	1,183	1,245	1,249	1,383
Fianna Fáil	Senator Tony Kett*	8.50	795	930	937	944	951	955	962	984	1,034	1,035	1,129
Fianna Fáil	Tom Stafford*	6.31	590	794	808	812	819	821	836	875	936	937	1,030
Green	Sheila Fogarty	4.62	432	604	627	640	651	697	726	787	928	937	
Fine Gael	Dave Kearney	4.45	416	510	528	533	538	543	552	579			
Independent	Ernie Beggs	2.06	193	256	261	273	300	307	333				
Workers' Party	Paul Hansard	1.09	102	144	151	154	156	187					
Socialist Workers	Joe Carolan	1.06	99	126	135	138	148						
Independent	Martin Byrne	0.78	73	104	109	124							
Independent	Tom Prendeville	0.57	53	83	86								
Electorate: 31,134 Valid: 9,357 (30.05%) Spoilt: 198 Quota: 1,560 Turnout: 9,555 (30.69%)

=== Pembroke ===
Pembroke - 3 seats
Party	Candidate	FPv%	Count				
Party	Candidate	FPv%	1	2	3	4	5
Fine Gael	Senator Joe Doyle*	23.42	1,724	1,772	1,873		
Labour	Dermot Lacey*	21.99	1,632	1,713	1,767	1,811	2,071
Fianna Fáil	Chris Andrews	16.64	1,225	1,261	1,320	1,618	1,736
Green	Claire Wheeler*	12.63	930	1,036	1,135	1,202	1,379
Fine Gael	Paddy McCartan	7.86	579	602	673	717	
Fianna Fáil	Liz Donnelly	6.15	453	476	520		
Progressive Democrats	Jason O'Mahony	6.00	442	470			
Independent	Catherine Cavendish	3.56	262				
Natural Law	John Burns	0.86	63				
Independent	Ian Murphy	0.71	52				
Electorate: 20,535 Valid: 7,362 (35.85%) Spoilt: 95 Quota: 1,841 Turnout: 7,457 (36.31%)

=== Rathmines ===
Rathmines - 4 seats
Party	Candidate	FPv%	Count						
Party	Candidate	FPv%	1	2	3	4	5	6	7
Green	Eamon Ryan*	17.24	1,434	1,453	1,465	1,556	1,583	1,765	
Fianna Fáil	Michael Donnelly*	16.89	1,405	1,410	1,418	1,431	1,867		
Fine Gael	Frances Fitzgerald	16.78	1,396	1,399	1,405	1,408	1,442	1,644	1,727
Labour	Mary Freehill*	16.23	1,350	1,356	1,362	1,411	1,430	1,521	1,575
Fine Gael	Terry Cosgrave	13.99	1,164	1,164	1,177	1,183	1,209	1,335	1,396
Progressive Democrats	Alan Robinson*	8.23	685	687	689	695	723		
Fianna Fáil	Loughlin Deegan	7.07	588	589	596	602			
Socialist Workers	Grace Lally	2.14	178	183	189				
Independent	Gary Byrnes	0.77	64	73					
Independent	Mir Silkbeard Kulhavy	0.62	55						
Electorate: 25,743 Valid: 8,319 (32.32%) Spoilt: 117 Quota: 1,664 Turnout: 8,436 (32.77%)

=== South-East Inner City ===
South-East Inner City - 3 seats
Party	Candidate	FPv%	Count					
Party	Candidate	FPv%	1	2	3	4	5	6
Fianna Fáil	Eoin Ryan Jnr TD*	16.65	968	975	1,011	1,467		
Labour	Kevin Humphreys	16.49	959	972	1,003	1,029	1,185	1,518
Green	Ciarán Cuffe*	14.43	839	854	884	910	1,052	1,358
Sinn Féin	Daithí Doolan	13.38	778	778	815	831	1,006	1,065
Fine Gael	Mark Henry	14.20	826	828	842	895	945	
Fianna Fáil	Garry Keegan	10.34	601	603	605			
Workers' Party	Tom Crilly	9.77	568	588	634	639		
Independent	Gabrielle Weafer-Arnold	3.39	197	206				
Socialist Workers	Shay Ryan	1.36	79					
Electorate: 18,557 Valid: 5,815 (31.34%) Spoilt: 115 Quota: 1,454 Turnout: 5,930 (31.96%)

=== South-West Inner City ===
South-West Inner City - 3 seats
Party	Candidate	FPv%	Count				
Party	Candidate	FPv%	1	2	3	4	5
Labour	John Gallagher*	16.83	1,052	1,137	1,426	1,466	1,605
Fine Gael	Catherine Byrne	15.53	971	996	1,059	1,160	1,635
Fianna Fáil	Mary Mooney*	15.02	939	1,010	1,055	1,493	1,644
Fine Gael	Karl Rock	12.21	763	798	859	910	
Sinn Féin	Ken Fitzgerald	11.68	730	834	913	973	1,022
Fianna Fáil	Tom Brunkard	11.41	713	732	757		
Green	Kristina McElroy	9.23	577	666			
Independent	Martina Kenna	6.80	425				
Independent	Denis Murphy	1.30	81				
Electorate: 20,542 Valid: 6,251 (30.43%) Spoilt: 143 Quota: 1,563 Turnout: 6,394 (31.13%)
