= 1999 Dublin South-Central by-election =

By-election to the 28th Dáil

- 27 October 1999
- Turnout: 20,116 (28.8%)
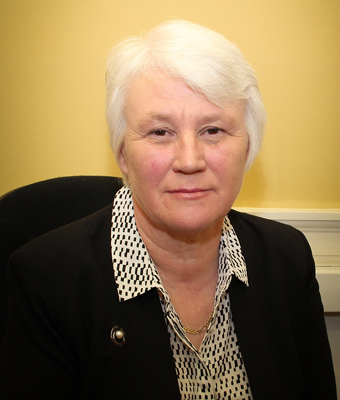
	Upton	Mulcahy
Nominee	Mary Upton	Michael Mulcahy	Catherine Byrne
Party	Labour	Fianna Fáil	Fine Gael
First preferences	5,637	6,050	4,037
Percentage	28.0%	30.1%	20.1%
Final count	10,274	7,901	–
TD before election
Pat Upton
Labour
TD after election
Mary Upton
Labour

A Dáil by-election was held in the constituency of Dublin South-Central in Ireland on Wednesday, 27 October 1999, to fill a vacancy in the 28th Dáil. It followed the death of Labour Teachta Dála (TD) Pat Upton on 22 February 1999.

The writ of election to fill the vacancy was agreed by the Dáil on 5 October 1999.

The by-election was won by the Labour candidate Mary Upton, sister of the deceased TD, Pat Upton.

The turnout at 28.0% was the lowest in by-election history at that time.

The other candidates were Dublin City Councillor Michael Mulcahy for Fianna Fáil, Dublin City Councillor Catherine Byrne for Fine Gael, Aengus Ó Snodaigh for Sinn Féin, John Goodwillie for the Green Party, Shay Kelly for the Workers' Party, Manus MacMeanmain for Christian Solidarity, Eammon Murphy as an independent and John Burns for Natural Law.

Mulcahy, Byrne and Ó Snodaigh would all go on to represent the constituency as TDs in the future.

== Result ==
1999 Dublin South-Central by-election
Party	Candidate	FPv%	Count							
Party	Candidate	FPv%	1	2	3	4	5	6	7	8
Fianna Fáil	Michael Mulcahy	30.1	6,050	6,059	6,108	6,157	6,330	6,497	7,005	7,901
Labour	Mary Upton	28.0	5,637	5,648	5,683	5,831	5,913	6,545	7,148	10,274
Fine Gael	Catherine Byrne	20.1	4,037	4,064	4,093	4,154	4,240	4,559	4,778	
Sinn Féin	Aengus Ó Snodaigh	8.4	1,686	1,689	1,708	1,800	1,849	2,051		
Green	John Goodwillie	6.3	1,263	1,297	1,330	1,477	1,588			
Workers' Party	Shay Kelly	2.8	555	561	566					
Christian Solidarity	Manus MacMeanmain	2.0	399	404	601	616				
Independent	Eammon Murphy	1.9	383	387						
Natural Law	John Burns	0.5	106							
Electorate: 69,771 Valid: 20,116 Quota: 10,059 Turnout: 28.8%
