= Cyprian Brady =

Irish former politician (born 1962)

Teachta Dála
- In office May 2007 – February 2011
- Constituency: Dublin Central

Senator
- In office 12 September 2002 – 24 May 2007
- Constituency: Nominated by the Taoiseach

Personal details
- Born: 26 June 1962 (age 64) Dublin, Ireland
- Party: Fianna Fáil

Cyprian Brady (born 26 June 1962) is an Irish former Fianna Fáil politician. He was a Teachta Dála (TD) for the Dublin Central constituency from 2007 to 2011. Brady is a former civil servant who for 20 years ran the constituency office of the former Taoiseach Bertie Ahern.

== Political career ==
In 2002, Brady was nominated by the Taoiseach, Bertie Ahern, as a member of the 22nd Seanad.

=== 2007 general election ===
In late 2005, Brady and his brother Royston, a former Lord Mayor of Dublin and unsuccessful candidate for the European Parliament, were both reported to be in contention for a Fianna Fáil nomination in the Dublin Central constituency. Although Dublin Central was the constituency of the then Taoiseach Bertie Ahern and was considered a strong Fianna Fáil constituency there was stiff competition from other parties. In 2002 the second Fianna Fáil TD Dermot Fitzpatrick had been elected in 2002 with a narrow margin of just 79 votes over the Sinn Féin candidate Nicky Kehoe.

The rivalry between the brothers led to a public call from a third brother, Fulton Brady, to "put an end to it". Royston was not one of the four contenders nominated for at the selection conference in March 2006, when Cyprian Brady and Councillor Mary Fitzpatrick were selected as Ahern's two running-mates. Fitzpatrick was the daughter of the outgoing TD Dermot Fitzpatrick.

At the 2007 general election, held under Ireland's single transferable vote system, Brady polled just 939 first preference votes (2.7%) in the first count. However he was elected on the fourth count, due in large part to a pre-arranged electoral strategy seeing large transfers from his running mate, the Taoiseach Bertie Ahern, and became only the second ever TD (after Brian O'Higgins) to be elected with less than 1,000 first-preference votes.

His election became the subject of a public interest (in large part because his running mate was the sitting Taoiseach), covered in national newspapers and on the RTÉ Radio 1 news programme Drivetime and on the weekly Documentary on One which had been covering the campaigns of the three female candidates in the constituency.

Mary Fitzpatrick, daughter of the outgoing Fianna Fáil TD and the third Fianna Fáil candidate in the 4-seat constituency, had received 1,725 first-preference votes, but whereas 2,403 of Ahern's surplus votes were transferred to Brady, only 1,362 went to Fitzpatrick. On the night before polling day, 24 May 2007, Fitzpatrick distributed leaflets to households asking people to vote for her as their first preference. In the early hours of the following morning, a letter had been hand-delivered from Ahern's office to 30,000 voters in the constituency, urging them give their first preference to the Taoiseach and their second to Brady. Since Ahern was expected to be elected with a large surplus, and the overall Fianna Fáil vote was likely to be large enough to elect two candidates, the destination of the Taoiseach's transfers would determine whether Brady or Fitzpatrick won the second Fianna Fáil seat in Dublin Central. After Ahern's transfers secured Brady's election, Fitzpatrick complained that "I didn't think they'd go out to completely undermine me and shaft me." Ahern's election agent Chris Wall blamed Fitzpatrick, saying "She was asked not to do this sort of thing. Having then done it, she therefore effectively set in train a motion she wasn't going to be able to stop." Brady said "An election is an election and not everybody can win", adding "Mary is a colleague of mine and she is a very good councillor. It's not really fair for Mary to be blaming anybody".

=== 2011 general election ===
In January 2011, he was selected as a Fianna Fáil candidate in Dublin Central for the 2011 general election along with Mary Fitzpatrick. Former Taoiseach Bertie Ahern said his loyalties this time would be with the sitting TD (Brady), and there was no hope of Fianna Fáil winning two seats in the constituency. He lost his seat having received 1,637 votes (4.7%).

Dáil	Election	Deputy (Party)	Deputy (Party)	Deputy (Party)	Deputy (Party)
19th	1969	Frank Cluskey (Lab)	Vivion de Valera (FF)	Thomas J. Fitzpatrick (FF)	Maurice E. Dockrell (FG)
20th	1973	Frank Cluskey (Lab)	Vivion de Valera (FF)	Thomas J. Fitzpatrick (FF)	Maurice E. Dockrell (FG)
21st	1977	Constituency abolished			

Dáil	Election	Deputy (Party)	Deputy (Party)	Deputy (Party)	Deputy (Party)	Deputy (Party)
22nd	1981	Bertie Ahern (FF)	Michael Keating (FG)	Alice Glenn (FG)	Michael O'Leary (Lab)	George Colley (FF)
23rd	1982 (Feb)	Bertie Ahern (FF)	Michael Keating (FG)	Tony Gregory (Ind.)	Michael O'Leary (Lab)	George Colley (FF)
24th	1982 (Nov)	Bertie Ahern (FF)	Michael Keating (FG)	Tony Gregory (Ind.)	Alice Glenn (FG)	George Colley (FF)
24th	1983 by-election	Bertie Ahern (FF)	Michael Keating (FG)	Tony Gregory (Ind.)	Alice Glenn (FG)	Tom Leonard (FF)
25th	1987	Bertie Ahern (FF)	Michael Keating (PDs)	Tony Gregory (Ind.)	Dermot Fitzpatrick (FF)	John Stafford (FF)
26th	1989	Bertie Ahern (FF)	Pat Lee (FG)	Tony Gregory (Ind.)	Dermot Fitzpatrick (FF)	John Stafford (FF)
27th	1992	Bertie Ahern (FF)	Jim Mitchell (FG)	Tony Gregory (Ind.)	Joe Costello (Lab)	4 seats 1992–2016
28th	1997	Bertie Ahern (FF)	Jim Mitchell (FG)	Tony Gregory (Ind.)	Marian McGennis (FF)	4 seats 1992–2016
29th	2002	Bertie Ahern (FF)	Dermot Fitzpatrick (FF)	Tony Gregory (Ind.)	Joe Costello (Lab)	4 seats 1992–2016
30th	2007	Bertie Ahern (FF)	Cyprian Brady (FF)	Tony Gregory (Ind.)	Joe Costello (Lab)	4 seats 1992–2016
30th	2009 by-election	Bertie Ahern (FF)	Cyprian Brady (FF)	Maureen O'Sullivan (Ind.)	Joe Costello (Lab)	4 seats 1992–2016
31st	2011	Mary Lou McDonald (SF)	Paschal Donohoe (FG)	Maureen O'Sullivan (Ind.)	Joe Costello (Lab)	4 seats 1992–2016
32nd	2016	Mary Lou McDonald (SF)	Paschal Donohoe (FG)	Maureen O'Sullivan (Ind.)	3 seats 2016–2020	
33rd	2020	Mary Lou McDonald (SF)	Paschal Donohoe (FG)	Gary Gannon (SD)	Neasa Hourigan (GP)	4 seats from 2020
34th	2024	Mary Lou McDonald (SF)	Paschal Donohoe (FG)	Gary Gannon (SD)	Marie Sherlock (Lab)	4 seats from 2020
34th	2026 by-election	Mary Lou McDonald (SF)	Daniel Ennis (SD)	Gary Gannon (SD)	Marie Sherlock (Lab)	4 seats from 2020
