= Mary Fitzpatrick =

Irish politician (born 1969)

Senator Mary Fitzpatrick
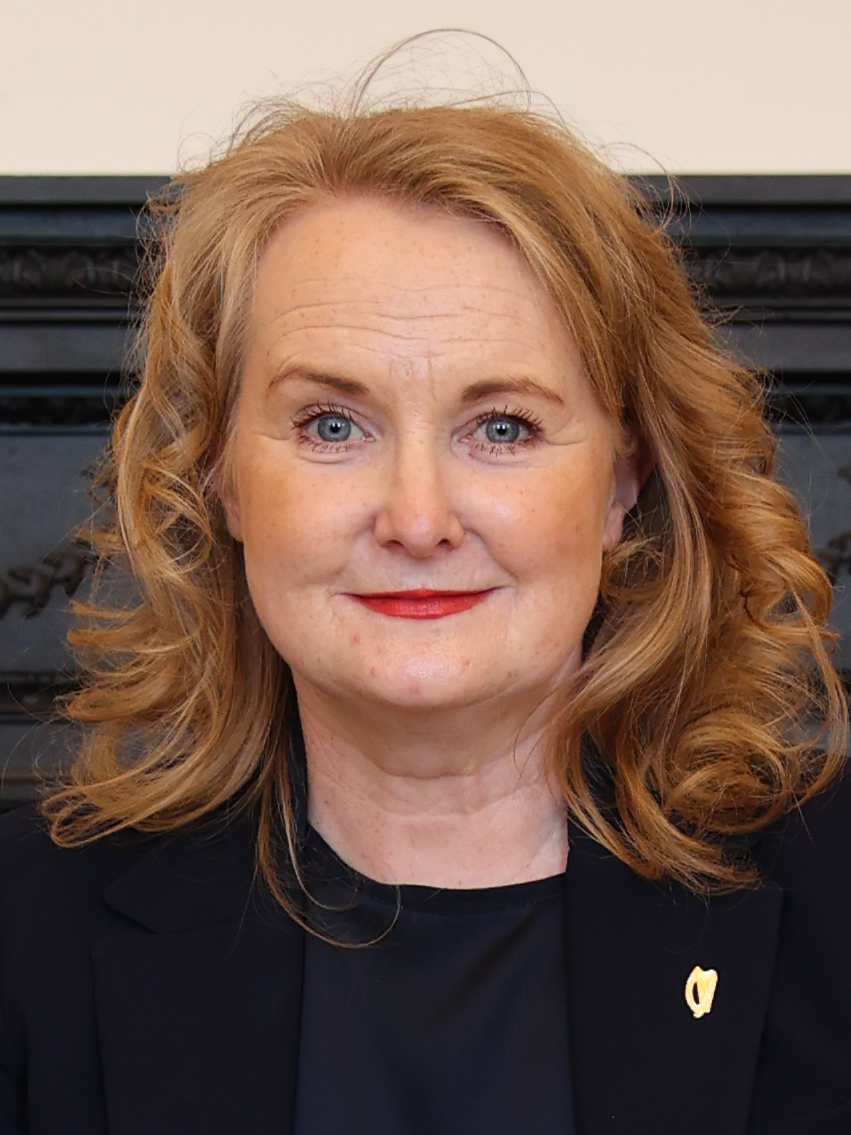
- Fitzpatrick in 2025

Senator
- Incumbent
- Assumed office 30 January 2025
- Constituency: Industrial and Commercial Panel
- In office 29 June 2020 – 30 January 2025
- Constituency: Nominated by the Taoiseach

Personal details
- Born: 20 February 1969 (age 57) Dublin, Ireland
- Party: Fianna Fáil
- Spouse: Sean Cody (m. 1999)
- Children: 3
- Parent: Dermot Fitzpatrick (father)
- Education: University College Dublin
- Website: maryfitzpatrick.ie

Mary Fitzpatrick (born 20 February 1969) is an Irish Fianna Fáil politician who has served as a senator since June 2020. She was elected for the Industrial and Commercial Panel in 2025, having previously been nominated by the Taoiseach in 2020.

== Early life ==
Fitzpatrick is from the Navan Road in Dublin and was educated at Our Lady Help of Christians and St. Dominic's College, Cabra before graduating from University College Dublin with a BA in German and Italian.

== Career ==
Fitzpatrick emigrated in the 1980s, living and working abroad with roles in the hospitality, manufacturing, education and construction sectors. From the early 1990s, she held International Sales and Marketing roles.

== Political career ==
Fitzpatrick was co-opted to Dublin City Council in 2003 to replace her father, Dermot Fitzpatrick, who stood down after the dual mandate prohibited sitting members of the Oireachtas from holding local authority seats. She was re-elected at the 2004 Dublin City Council election, polling over 10% of the vote.

=== 2007 general election ===
At the 2007 general election, her father retired. Mary Fitzpatrick was one of three candidates selected for Fianna Fáil in Dublin Central, along with Taoiseach Bertie Ahern and Cyprian Brady. Held under Ireland's single transferable vote system, Brady polled just 939 first preference votes (2.7%) in the first count, compared to Fitzpatrick's 1,725. However he was elected on the fourth count, due in large part to transfers from his Ahern, and became only the second ever TD (after Brian O'Higgins) to be elected with less than 1,000 first-preference votes.

The election became the subject of a public controversy, covered in national newspapers and on the RTÉ Radio 1 news programme Drivetime and on the weekly Documentary on One which had been covering the campaigns of the three female candidates in the constituency.

Fitzpatrick, was the daughter of the outgoing Fianna Fáil TD and the third Fianna Fáil candidate in the 4-seat constituency, received 1,725 first-preference votes and 1,362 of Ahern's transfers (whereas Brady received 2,403). On the night before polling day, 24 May 2007, Fitzpatrick distributed leaflets to households asking people to vote for her as their first preference. In the early hours of the following morning, a letter had been hand-delivered from Ahern's office to 30,000 voters in the constituency, urging them to give their first preference to the Taoiseach and their second to Brady. Since Ahern was expected to be elected with a large surplus, and the overall Fianna Fáil vote was likely to be large enough to elect two candidates, the destination of the Taoiseach's transfers would determine whether Brady or Fitzpatrick won the second Fianna Fáil seat in Dublin Central. After Ahern's transfers secured Brady's election, Fitzpatrick complained that "I didn't think they'd go out to completely undermine me and shaft me." Ahern's election agent Chris Wall blamed Fitzpatrick, saying "She was asked not to do this sort of thing. Having then done it, she therefore effectively set in train a motion she wasn't going to be able to stop." Brady said "An election is an election and not everybody can win", adding "Mary is a colleague of mine and she is a very good councillor. It's not really fair for Mary to be blaming anybody".

=== 2009 local elections ===
Fitzpatrick was the only Fianna Fáil candidate to be elected on the first count in Dublin in the 2009 local elections. The massive difference between Fitzpatrick's result and that of Maurice Ahern, brother of the former Taoiseach who lost his council seat, was viewed as a reaction to perceived unfairness in Fitzpatrick's treatment by the "Ahern machine" or the "Drumcondra mafia".

=== 2011 general election ===
In January 2011, she was selected as a Fianna Fáil candidate in Dublin Central for the 2011 general election. Former Taoiseach Bertie Ahern, who was not running again, said his loyalties this time would be with sitting TD Cyprian Brady and there was no hope of Fianna Fáil winning two seats in the constituency.

During the campaign, former Labour Party leader Pat Rabbitte, reacting to her appointment as Fianna Fáil spokesperson on Housing and Urban Development, said "You might as well wander down Grafton Street and see if you can meet a couple of good-looking women and say, 'Would you ever mind coming up for the photograph'." Fitzpatrick replied: "I'm happy to take the compliment of being a good-looking woman any day, particularly from the Opposition. But I do take issue with his dismissive and patronising attitude to the contribution I've made to political life. It is a real shame that when women are given important jobs on their own merits, they have to deal with sexist comments from Pat Rabbitte."

During the campaign the rows between her and Cyprian Brady were widely reported in the media. Suffering from the massive backlash against Fianna Fáil in Dublin she polled 10% of the vote, losing the final seat to Mary Lou McDonald of Sinn Féin.

=== 2011 Seanad election ===
Fitzpatrick was a candidate in the 2011 election to the 24th Seanad on the Administrative Panel but was not elected. As a consequence of the Seanad "inside/outside" election rules, Fitzparick was the highest polling candidate not be elected.

=== 2014 European Parliament election ===
She was selected as the Fianna Fáil candidate for the Dublin constituency at the 2014 European Parliament election. She illegally erected posters too early, causing some controversy when she was accused of flouting regulations. She failed to get elected.

=== 2016 and 2020 general elections ===
At the 2016 general election, she stood again in Dublin Central. She received 10.6% of the first preference votes but was not elected. At the 2019 local elections, she stood in the Cabra-Glasnevin local electoral area. She received 19.4% of the first preference votes and topped the poll on the first count. At the 2020 general election, she was eliminated in the Dublin Central constituency, having received 10.3% of the first preference votes.

In June 2020, she was nominated by the Taoiseach Micheál Martin to the Seanad.

=== 2024 general election ===
At the 2024 general election, she stood again in Dublin Central. She received 7.2% of the first preference votes but was not elected. She was re-elected to the Seanad in January 2025 on the Industrial and Commercial Panel. She is the Fianna Fáil Seanad spokesperson on Dublin, Dublin City Taskforce, Local Government and Heritage.

In February 2026, she ruled herself out of contesting the 2026 Dublin Central by-election.

== Personal life ==
Fitzpatrick lives in Glasnevin, Dublin with her husband Seán Cody, and their three children. She speaks German, Italian and French.
