= Peter Sands =

Peter Sands may refer to:

- Peter Sands (banker) (born 1962), CEO of Standard Chartered Bank
- Peter Sands (politician) (1924–2015), Irish Fianna Fáil politician
- Peter Sands, a fictional character in the TV series Private Secretary
