= 22nd Seanad =

Members of the Seanad from 2002 to 2007

| ← | 21st Seanad | 23rd Seanad | → |

Overview
- Legislative body: Seanad Éireann
- Jurisdiction: Ireland
- Meeting place: Leinster House
- Term: 12 September 2002 – 4 July 2007
- Government: 26th government of Ireland
- Members: 60
- Cathaoirleach: Rory Kiely (FF)
- Leas-Chathaoirleach: Paddy Burke (FG)
- Leader of the Seanad: Mary O'Rourke (FF)

The 22nd Seanad was in office from 2002 to 2007. An election to Seanad Éireann, the senate of the Oireachtas (Irish parliament), followed the 2002 general election to the 29th Dáil. The senators served until the close of poll for the 23rd Seanad, which was 23 July 2007 for panel members and 24 July 2007 for university members.

== Cathaoirleach ==
Rory Kiely (FF) was elected as Cathaoirleach. This followed a vote of Fianna Fáil senators, in which Kiely was one of four candidates for nomination to the position.

On 13 September 2002, Paddy Burke (FG) was proposed as Leas-Chathaoirleach by Jim Higgins (FG) and seconded by Michael Finucane (FG). He was elected without a division.

== Composition of the 22nd Seanad ==
There are a total of 60 seats in the Seanad. 43 Senators are elected by the vocational panels, 6 elected by universities and 11 are nominated by the Taoiseach.

The following table shows the composition by party when the 22nd Seanad first met on 12 September 2002.

| Origin Party | Vocational panels | | | | | NUI | DU | Nominated | Total |
| Origin Party | Admin | Agri | Cult & Educ | Ind & Comm | Labour | NUI | DU | Nominated | Total |
|---|---|---|---|---|---|---|---|---|---|
| Fianna Fáil | 4 | 6 | 3 | 5 | 6 | 0 | 0 | 6 | 30 |
| Fine Gael | 2 | 4 | 2 | 3 | 4 | 0 | 0 | 0 | 15 |
| Labour Party | 1 | 1 | 0 | 1 | 1 | 1 | 0 | 0 | 5 |
| Progressive Democrats | 0 | 0 | 0 | 0 | 0 | 0 | 0 | 4 | 4 |
| Independent | 0 | 0 | 0 | 0 | 0 | 2 | 3 | 1 | 6 |
| Total | 7 | 11 | 5 | 9 | 11 | 3 | 3 | 11 | 60 |

=== Effect of changes ===
| Party | 2002^{1} | May 2007^{2} | July 2007^{3} |
|---|---|---|---|
| Fianna Fáil | 30 | 27 | 24 |
| Fine Gael | 15 | 15 | 9 |
| Labour | 5 | 5 | 4 |
| Progressive Democrats | 4 | 5 | 5 |
| Independent | 6 | 8 | 8 |
| Vacant | 0 | 0 | 10 |
| Total | 60 | | |

Notes

1. The 2002 column indicates the state of parties when 22nd Seanad first met in 2002
2. The May 2007 column indicates the state of parties on the dissolution of the 29th Dáil
3. The July 2007 column indicates the state of parties when the Seanad reassembled after the 2007 Dáil election, when 14 senators were elected to the 30th Dáil, including 4 senators who had been nominated by the Taoiseach, who were replaced by 4 new nominees.

== List of senators ==
- Note: The entries for Senators who were elected or appointed to fill vacancies are shown in italics

| Name | Panel | Party | Notes |
|---|---|---|---|
| Timmy Dooley | Administrative Panel | Fianna Fáil | Elected to 30th Dáil at general election on 24 May 2007 |
| Frank Feighan | Administrative Panel | Fine Gael | Elected to 30th Dáil at general election on 24 May 2007 |
| Camillus Glynn | Administrative Panel | Fianna Fáil | |
| Tony Kett | Administrative Panel | Fianna Fáil | |
| Joe McHugh | Administrative Panel | Fine Gael | Elected to 30th Dáil at general election on 24 May 2007 |
| Joanna Tuffy | Administrative Panel | Labour | Elected to 30th Dáil at general election on 24 May 2007 |
| Diarmuid Wilson | Administrative Panel | Fianna Fáil | |
| Paul Bradford | Agricultural Panel | Fine Gael | |
| Paddy Burke | Agricultural Panel | Fine Gael | |
| Ulick Burke | Agricultural Panel | Fine Gael | Elected to 30th Dáil at general election on 24 May 2007 |
| Peter Callanan | Agricultural Panel | Fianna Fáil | |
| Rory Kiely | Agricultural Panel | Fianna Fáil | Cathaoirleach |
| Martin Mansergh | Agricultural Panel | Fianna Fáil | Elected to 30th Dáil at general election on 24 May 2007 |
| Francis O'Brien | Agricultural Panel | Fianna Fáil | |
| Kathleen O'Meara | Agricultural Panel | Labour | |
| John Paul Phelan | Agricultural Panel | Fine Gael | |
| Eamon Scanlon | Agricultural Panel | Fianna Fáil | Elected to 30th Dáil at general election on 24 May 2007 |
| Jim Walsh | Agricultural Panel | Fianna Fáil | |
| Noel Coonan | Cultural and Educational Panel | Fine Gael | Elected to 30th Dáil at general election on 24 May 2007 |
| Brian Hayes | Cultural and Educational Panel | Fine Gael | Elected to 30th Dáil at general election on 24 May 2007 |
| Paschal Mooney | Cultural and Educational Panel | Fianna Fáil | |
| Labhrás Ó Murchú | Cultural and Educational Panel | Fianna Fáil | |
| Ann Ormonde | Cultural and Educational Panel | Fianna Fáil | |
| James Bannon | Industrial and Commercial Panel | Fine Gael | Elected to 30th Dáil at general election on 24 May 2007 |
| Eddie Bohan | Industrial and Commercial Panel | Fianna Fáil | |
| Paul Coghlan | Industrial and Commercial Panel | Fine Gael | |
| Margaret Cox | Industrial and Commercial Panel | Fianna Fáil | Party whip removed on 4 April 2007; thereafter sat as an independent |
| Marc MacSharry | Industrial and Commercial Panel | Fianna Fáil | |
| Derek McDowell | Industrial and Commercial Panel | Labour | |
| Kieran Phelan | Industrial and Commercial Panel | Fianna Fáil | |
| Sheila Terry | Industrial and Commercial Panel | Fine Gael | |
| Mary White | Industrial and Commercial Panel | Fianna Fáil | |
| Fergal Browne | Labour Panel | Fine Gael | |
| Maurice Cummins | Labour Panel | Fine Gael | |
| Brendan Daly | Labour Panel | Fianna Fáil | |
| Geraldine Feeney | Labour Panel | Fianna Fáil | |
| Michael Finucane | Labour Panel | Fine Gael | |
| Liam Fitzgerald | Labour Panel | Fianna Fáil | Left Fianna Fáil on 28 March 2007; thereafter sat as an independent |
| John Hanafin | Labour Panel | Fianna Fáil | |
| Jim Higgins | Labour Panel | Fine Gael | |
| Terry Leyden | Labour Panel | Fianna Fáil | |
| Don Lydon | Labour Panel | Fianna Fáil | |
| Michael McCarthy | Labour Panel | Labour | |
| Joe O'Toole | National University of Ireland | Independent | |
| Feargal Quinn | National University of Ireland | Independent | |
| Brendan Ryan | National University of Ireland | Labour | |
| Mary Henry | Dublin University | Independent | |
| David Norris | Dublin University | Independent | |
| Shane Ross | Dublin University | Independent | |
| Cyprian Brady | Nominated by the Taoiseach | Fianna Fáil | Elected to 30th Dáil at general election on 24 May 2007 |
| Michael Brennan | Nominated by the Taoiseach | Fianna Fáil | Joined the Progressive Democrats on 29 April 2004 |
| John Dardis | Nominated by the Taoiseach | Progressive Democrats | |
| Maurice Hayes | Nominated by the Taoiseach | Independent | |
| Brendan Kenneally | Nominated by the Taoiseach | Fianna Fáil | Elected to 30th Dáil at general election on 24 May 2007 |
| Michael Kitt | Nominated by the Taoiseach | Fianna Fáil | Elected to 30th Dáil at general election on 24 May 2007 |
| John Minihan | Nominated by the Taoiseach | Progressive Democrats | |
| Tom Morrissey | Nominated by the Taoiseach | Progressive Democrats | |
| Pat Moylan | Nominated by the Taoiseach | Fianna Fáil | |
| Mary O'Rourke | Nominated by the Taoiseach | Fianna Fáil | Leader of the Seanad until her election to 30th Dáil on 24 May 2007 |
| Kate Walsh | Nominated by the Taoiseach | Progressive Democrats | Died on 24 April 2007 |
| Colm O'Gorman | Nominated by the Taoiseach | Progressive Democrats | Nominated on 3 May 2007 to replace Kate Walsh |
| Donie Cassidy | Nominated by the Taoiseach | Fianna Fáil | Nominated on 23 June 2007 to replace Mary O'Rourke, who was elected to the 30th Dáil at the general election on 24 May 2007. |
| Seán Dorgan | Nominated by the Taoiseach | Fianna Fáil | Nominated on 23 June 2007 to replace Michael Kitt, who was elected to the 30th Dáil at the general election on 24 May 2007. |
| Peter Sands | Nominated by the Taoiseach | Fianna Fáil | Nominated on 23 June 2007 to replace Brendan Kenneally, who was elected to the 30th Dáil at the general election on 24 May 2007. |
| Chris Wall | Nominated by the Taoiseach | Fianna Fáil | Nominated on 23 June 2007 to replace Cyprian Brady, who was elected to the 30th Dáil at the general election on 24 May 2007. |

== Changes ==
| Date | Panel | Loss | Gain | Note |
|---|---|---|---|---|
| 29 April 2004 | Nominated by the Taoiseach | Fianna Fáil | Progressive Democrats | Michael Brennan joined the Progressive Democrats |
| 28 March 2007 | Labour Panel | Fianna Fáil | Independent | Liam Fitzgerald resigned from Fianna Fáil |
| 4 April 2007 | Industrial and Commercial Panel | Fianna Fáil | Independent | Margaret Cox resigned from Fianna Fáil |
| 24 April 2007 | Nominated by the Taoiseach | Progressive Democrats | | Death of Kate Walsh |
| 3 May 2007 | Nominated by the Taoiseach | | Progressive Democrats | Colm O'Gorman nominated to replace Kate Walsh |
| 24 May 2007 | Administrative Panel | Fianna Fáil | | Timmy Dooley elected to the 30th Dáil |
| 24 May 2007 | Administrative Panel | Fine Gael | | Frank Feighan elected to the 30th Dáil |
| 24 May 2007 | Administrative Panel | Fine Gael | | Joe McHugh elected to the 30th Dáil |
| 24 May 2007 | Administrative Panel | Labour | | Joanna Tuffy elected to the 30th Dáil |
| 24 May 2007 | Agricultural Panel | Fine Gael | | Ulick Burke elected to the 30th Dáil |
| 24 May 2007 | Agricultural Panel | Fianna Fáil | | Martin Mansergh elected to the 30th Dáil |
| 24 May 2007 | Agricultural Panel | Fianna Fáil | | Eamon Scanlon elected to the 30th Dáil |
| 24 May 2007 | Cultural and Educational Panel | Fine Gael | | Noel Coonan elected to the 30th Dáil |
| 24 May 2007 | Cultural and Educational Panel | Fine Gael | | Brian Hayes elected to the 30th Dáil |
| 24 May 2007 | Industrial and Commercial Panel | Fine Gael | | James Bannon elected to the 30th Dáil |
| 24 May 2007 | Nominated by the Taoiseach | Fianna Fáil | | Mary O'Rourke elected to the 30th Dáil |
| 24 May 2007 | Nominated by the Taoiseach | Fianna Fáil | | Cyprian Brady elected to the 30th Dáil |
| 24 May 2007 | Nominated by the Taoiseach | Fianna Fáil | | Michael Kitt elected to the 30th Dáil |
| 24 May 2007 | Nominated by the Taoiseach | Fianna Fáil | | Brendan Kenneally elected to the 30th Dáil |
| 23 June 2007 | Nominated by the Taoiseach | | Fianna Fáil | Donie Cassidy nominated to fill vacancy |
| 23 June 2007 | Nominated by the Taoiseach | | Fianna Fáil | Chris Wall nominated to fill vacancy |
| 23 June 2007 | Nominated by the Taoiseach | | Fianna Fáil | Seán Dorgan nominated to fill vacancy |
| 23 June 2007 | Nominated by the Taoiseach | | Fianna Fáil | Peter Sands nominated to fill vacancy |
