= Eibhlin Byrne =

Irish former politician

Dublin City Councillor
- In office 2003–2009
- Constituency: Clontarf

Lord Mayor of Dublin
- In office 30 June 2008 – 30 June 2009
- Preceded by: Paddy Bourke
- Succeeded by: Emer Costello

Personal details
- Party: Fianna Fáil
- Spouse: Ken Byrne
- Children: 3
- Education: University College Dublin

Eibhlin Byrne is a former Fianna Fáil politician who served on Dublin City Council from 2003 to 2009, including as Lord Mayor of Dublin from 2008 to 2009.

Byrne has held a number of senior positions including (current) Acting Director of the Daughters of Charity Child and Family Service, Head of Communication and Advocacy at Depaul Trust (Homeless Service) (2003–2006), and Chair of the National Council on Ageing and Older People, and as chairperson or board member of many other organizations. In 2023, she was appointed as National Lead on Civic Engagement at the Department of Children, Equality, Disability, Integration and Youth.

Byrne began her career as a secondary school teacher. She was a member of the Dublin City Council for the Clontarf area from 2003 to 2009 when she was co-opted to replace Sandra Geraghty. She was re-elected in June 2004 for a five-year term. She was elected as Lord Mayor in 2008 by Fianna Fáil councillors with the support of councillors from the Labour Party, Sinn Féin and several Independents. Byrne was previously a member of the City Council's Housing Strategic Policy Group, the Dublin Regional Authority, and the Dublin Bay Task Force. She was also a member of Commissions on Crime and on Ageing in the City.

On 15 April 2009, Byrne was nominated as a Fianna Fáil candidate (along with Eoin Ryan) for the Dublin constituency at the 2009 European Parliament election which was held on 5 June 2009 but she was not elected. Byrne did not stand for re-election to Dublin City Council. She resigned from Fianna Fáil in 2011.

In 2009, Byrne drew criticism when she suggested it was unpatriotic for the Republic's citizens to go shopping in Northern Ireland. Her comments were denounced as partitionist by Sinn Féin's Martin McGuinness.

Civic offices
Preceded by Paddy Bourke	Lord Mayor of Dublin; 2008–2009	Succeeded by Emer Costello
