= Seán Dorgan =

Irish politician (born 1968)

Senator
- In office 23 June 2007 – 13 September 2007
- Constituency: Nominated by the Taoiseach

Personal details
- Born: 13 March 1968 (age 58) Cork, Ireland
- Party: Fianna Fáil
- Spouse: Laura Dorgan (m. 1997)
- Children: 2
- Education: University College Dublin

Seán Michael Dorgan (born 13 March 1968) is an Irish Fianna Fáil politician who has served as general secretary of Fianna Fáil since June 2007.

He was also briefly a member of the 22nd Seanad, to which he was nominated by the Taoiseach, Bertie Ahern, on 23 June 2007, to fill one of the vacancies left by the election of four senators to Dáil Éireann at the 2007 general election.
