= Mary Moran (politician) =

Irish former politician (born 1960)

Senator
- In office 25 May 2011 – 8 June 2016
- Constituency: Nominated by the Taoiseach

Personal details
- Born: 28 June 1960 (age 66) Drogheda, County Louth, Ireland
- Party: Labour Party
- Relatives: Emer Costello (sister); Joe Costello (brother-in-Law)
- Education: University College Dublin

Mary Moran (née Malone; born 28 June 1960) is an Irish former Labour Party politician who served as a Senator from 2011 to 2016, after being nominated by the Taoiseach.

Moran is from Dundalk, County Louth. She was educated at St. Vincent's Secondary School, Dundalk and University College Dublin.

She unsuccessfully contested the Louth constituency at the 2011 general election. In April 2011, she was a Labour Party candidate for the 2011 Seanad Éireann election on the Administrative Panel but was not elected. In May 2011, she was nominated by the Taoiseach Enda Kenny to the 24th Seanad.

She is a former secondary school teacher. Her sister is former MEP Emer Costello.

She was the Labour Party Seanad spokesperson on Education, Disability, Equality and Mental Health.
