= Dermot Lacey =

Irish politician (born 1960)

Cllr Dermot Lacey
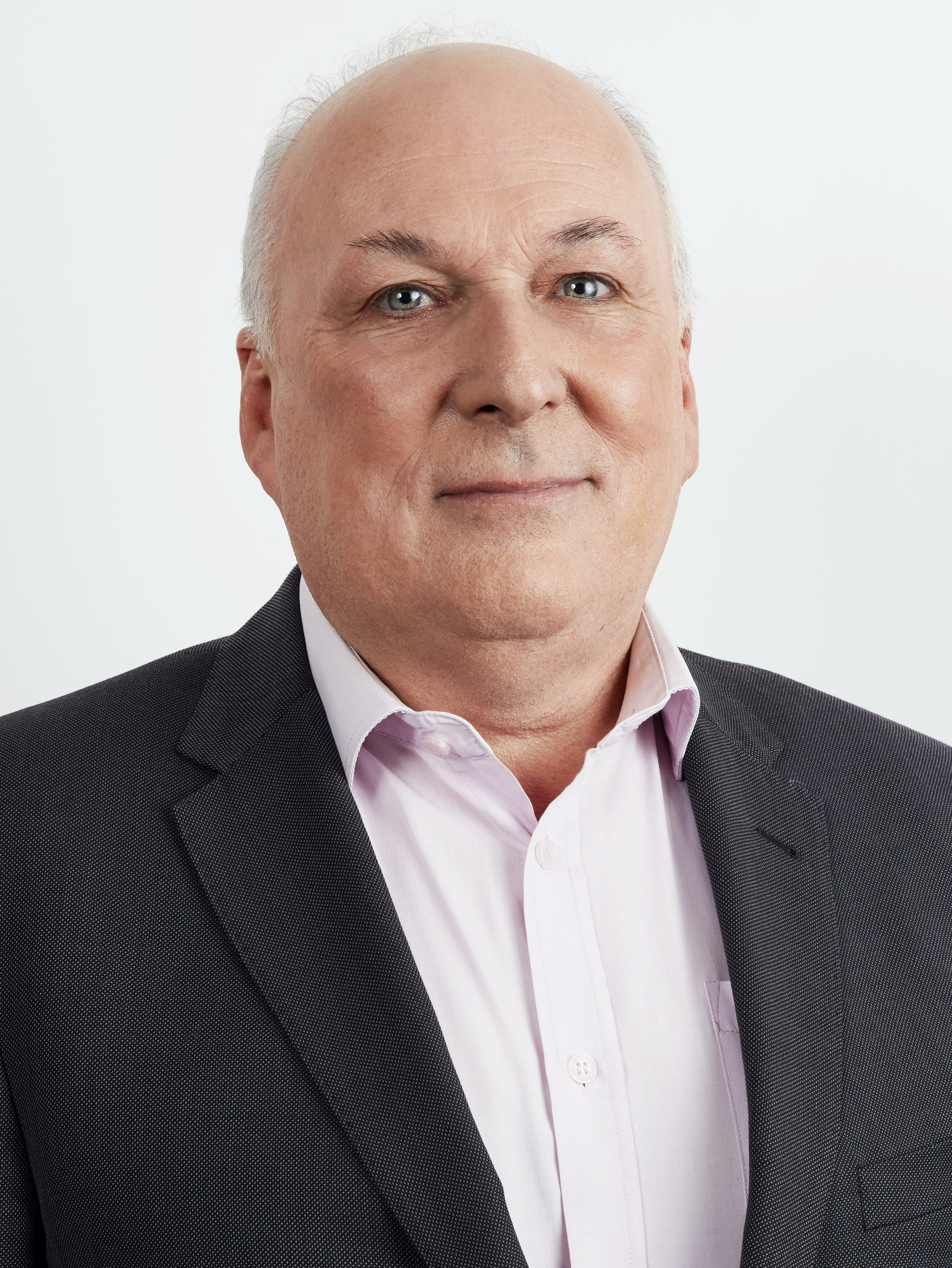
- Lacey in 2019

Dublin City Councillor
- Incumbent
- Assumed office March 1993
- Constituency: Pembroke

Lord Mayor of Dublin
- In office June 2002 – June 2003
- Preceded by: Anthony Creevey
- Succeeded by: Royston Brady

Personal details
- Born: 11 February 1960 (age 66) Dublin, Ireland
- Party: Labour Party
- Spouse: Jill Lacey (m. 1992)

Dermot Lacey (born 11 February 1960) is an Irish Labour Party politician. He is a member of Dublin City Council in Dublin, Ireland.

== Political career ==
Lacey has been a member of Dublin City Council since 1993 - first representing the South East Inner City area and, since the 1999 local elections, the Pembroke area and the Rathmines Pembroke area. In 2014 he was elected for the Pembroke South Dock area. He has thus represented at one stage or another the entire Dublin South East Constituency and most of Dublin Bay South. He topped the poll in the 2004 local elections. He first joined the Labour Party in 1977 and has served as a Branch Officer and Constituency Officer for much of that time.

He was a member of the National Youth Committee of Labour Youth and employed as the National Youth Development Officer for a period of ten years. He was Dublin South-East Director of Elections for various referendums and for Ruairi Quinn's Dáil campaign in the 2002 general election.

On the City Council, Lacey has been: Chairperson of the South East Area Committee, the Enterprise and Employment Committee and the Strategic Policy Committees on Arts, Culture Leisure and Youth, the Finance Committee, the Housing Committee and is presently Chairperson of the Protocol Committee. He also served as Cathaoirleach (chairman) of the Dublin Regional Authority, the Southern and Eastern Regional Assembly and the new Eastern and Midlands Regional Assembly. He is the only person to have held all three Regional posts.

From July 2002 to July 2003, he served as Lord Mayor of Dublin. In the most controversial period of his officeholding, he cast the deciding vote at City Council to pass the 2003 budget, which included increases to domestic waste charges. This came after several meetings had failed to pass any budget, and the Minister for the Environment & Local Government had threatened to disband the City Council. After the vote, Lacey was expelled from the Labour Party Group on Dublin City Council, and spent the remainder of his term until the 2004 Local Elections as an Independent Councillor. However, he remained a member of the Labour Party, and, when his term as Lord Mayor expired, returned to his previous job as a member of Labour Party staff.

He contested the 2004 Local Elections as a Labour Party candidate in the Pembroke area, topping the poll on the first count, and rejoined the Labour Party Group on the City Council at its first meeting following that election. He was re-elected along with two other Labour Councillors for the Pembroke Rathmines area in 2009. He was re-elected for the Pembroke South Dock area in 2014 and for the Pembroke area in 2019. At the 2024 local elections he was again elected to represent the Pembroke area.

In 2011 he published "A Fair City - One Dublin Many Dubliners" which outlined a governance model for Dublin.

In April 2012 he was elected Leader of the Labour Group on Dublin City Council and in September he was elected Cathaoirleach of the Southern and Eastern Regional Assembly. He was one of Dublin's highest paid public representatives in 2012/2013. In 2014 he went on the record to criticise pay rises for certain rural councillors, saying urban councillors like him deserved expense increases also. In December 2015, following an RTÉ Primetime Investigates television programme, he said that many of the expense forms which councillors must complete are too complicated and should be simplified and streamlined.

== Background and other interests ==
Lacey has been for many years an active youth worker particularly within the Scout Movement. He was Vice president of the National Youth Council of Ireland for four years. He is a member of the City of Dublin Youth Service Board and has been twice appointed to the Board of FÁS representing "Youth Interests". He was elected Lord Mayor of Dublin for the period July 2002 to July 2003, and since its inception, has been a member of the Dublin City Development Board. At local level, Lacey is Chairperson of "Community Services - Sandymount, Irishtown, Ringsend". He was founder of the popular News 4 community newspaper. He is on the Board of the Donnybrook Community Playgroup and is a member of Clan na Gael Fontenoys GAA Club. He is a member of the Board of the Royal Hospital Donnybrook Voluntary Housing Association and Chairperson of the Donnybrook Community Employment Scheme Board.

He was a member of the Governing Authority of UCD 2015–2020.

He contributes regularly to the "Villagers" section of Village magazine. He is also a contributor on the internet discussion board Politics.ie. He lives with his wife Jill, who works in the child protection unit of Scouting Ireland, and two children in Donnybrook, Dublin.

== Scouting career ==
He was a member of the National Executive Board of Scouting Ireland (CSI) and was a key figure in the formation of Scouting Ireland. He was the Chairperson of 3rd/40th/41st Dublin, Donnybrook Scout Group, whose Venture Scouts were the winners of the Youth for Development Prize 2005 for their work in Peru. In 2006 he retired as chairperson and is now the President of the Group, a non-executive position. He has often been a critic of the development of Scouting Ireland since its inception on January 1, 2004, stating that it has moved away from the goals of the creation of a single Scouting Movement in Ireland. He received the Order of the Silver Wolfhound under Scouting Ireland, thus making him an Honorary Member of the Order of CúChulainn.

In October 2018 he was elected to the newly constructed Board of Scouting Ireland. In March 2019, following ongoing public discussion about concerns raised about Scouting Ireland's child protection practices, Lacey tweeted criticism of Tusla, saying it was arrogant and “allowed to get away with (it) by a lazy media and gullible politicians”. It followed public statements by the chair of Scouting Ireland that it was not in conflict with Tusla. He subsequently said that his criticism was not of Tusla's engagement with the board he sat on(and his wife's employer), but instead based on his experience in the fostering area. He said no public body "deserved less respect". This was reported in national newspapers.

In 2017 to mark the 90th Anniversary of the Donnybrook (formerly CBSI) Scout Group he published a Book, "All the Red Ties", a history of the Group.

Civic offices
Preceded by Anthony Creevey	Lord Mayor of Dublin; 2002–2003	Succeeded by Royston Brady
