= Partitionism =

View of Ireland as having two distinct parts

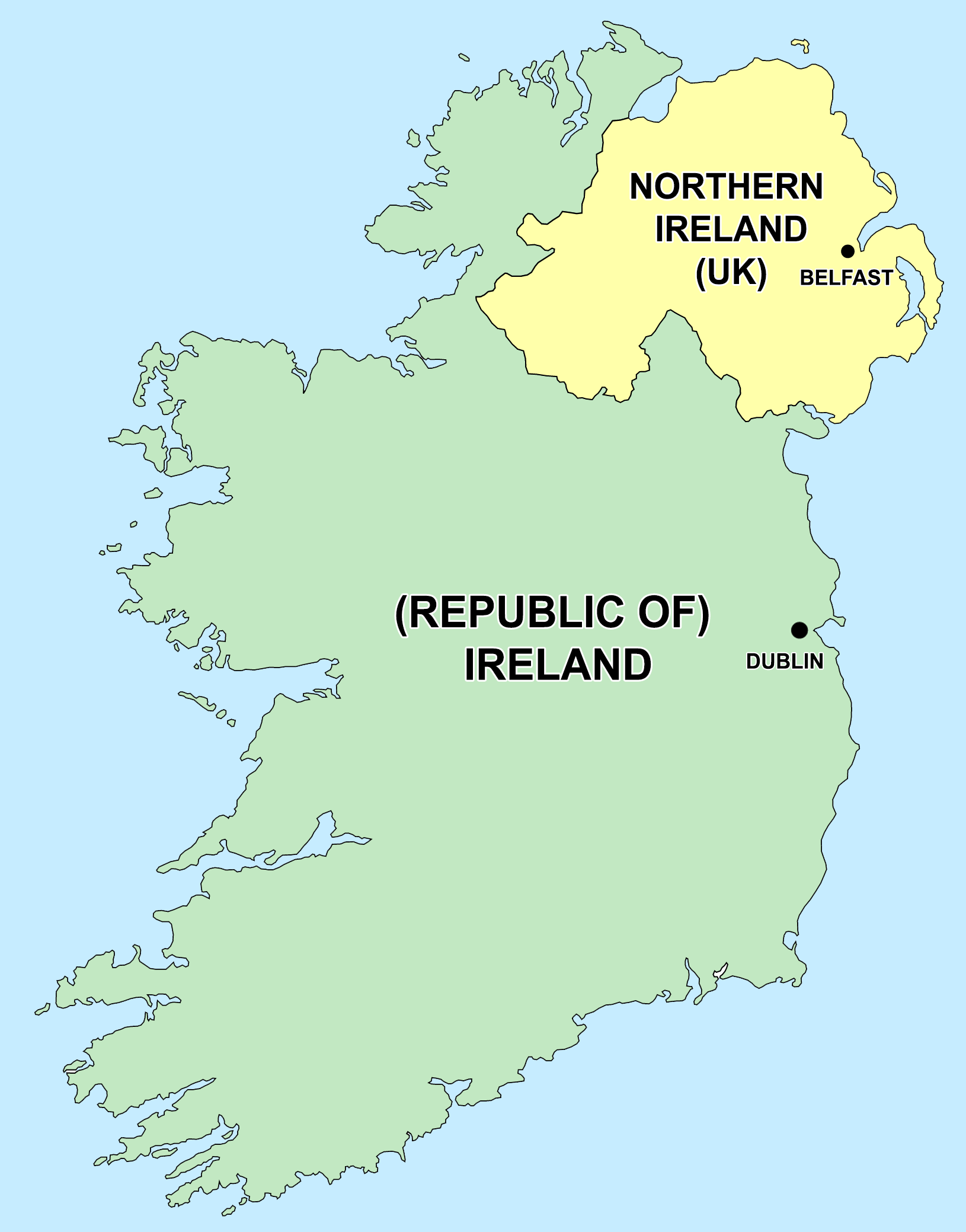
Ireland and its two jurisdictions

In Ireland, partitionism (Irish: críochdheighiltíocht) is a view on Irish politics, culture, geography, or history that treats Northern Ireland and the Republic of Ireland as distinct. Partitionists may emphasise the perceived differences between the two jurisdictions and the people who live within them.

Partitionism has mostly been used to describe those in the Republic of Ireland who view Northern Ireland and the people who live there as separate and different. It is usually used among Irish nationalists and republicans "as a criticism of those in the south who pay lip-service to the ideal of Irish unity but who are smugly comfortable with a 26 county republic".

== Attitudes to partition ==
The Derry Journal has described partitionism as "a criticism of those in the south who pay lip-service to the ideal of Irish unity but who are smugly comfortable with the 26 county Republic". Likewise, in his book Luck and the Irish, R. F. Foster used the term partitionism to refer to what Bernard O'Donoghue described as "the tacit acceptance in the South of a border that worked to its economic advantage".

In 2009, the Sinn Féin MLA Martin McGuinness used the term in denouncing Lord Mayor of Dublin Eibhlin Byrne, who had suggested it was "unpatriotic" for people from the Republic of Ireland to go shopping for cheaper prices in Northern Ireland. Commenting on McGuinness's remarks, Peter Robinson said: "For republicans, partitionism, I think, is defined as the practice of advocating the removal of the border but behaving in a manner which reinforces it".

=== Ireland and Irishness ===
When the island was partitioned in 1921, thousands of Irish Catholics and nationalists were left "stranded" in the "Protestant, Pro-British state" of Northern Ireland. The two leading anti partitionist politicians in Northern Ireland at that time (and after) were Cahir Healy and Joseph Devlin. Some nationalists have described partitionism as the belief that "Ireland" and "Irishness" are confined to the Republic of Ireland. For example, during a debate in the Dáil on 9 March 1999, Austin Currie denounced those in the Republic of Ireland who questioned the Irishness of "northern" Catholics:

I am sorry to say it was not only in the North that our Irish identity was questioned. Some in this State questioned our Irishness and there are some who still do. Partitionism over the years of separation became a fact of life; sometimes in the most unexpected quarters, as I found through personal experience including an occasion in this House.

Likewise, Austin Currie, writing in The Irish Times in 1997, described a "partitionist mentality" in the Republic of Ireland and stated that "those elements in this State who query the Irishness of Northern nationalists, who speak of their difference in almost racist terms, should seriously consider counselling".

During the 1997 presidential election campaign, Fine Gael printed and circulated leaflets that stated: "The presidency is about the nation behind the state. About all the individual people who make up Irish society. It is the only public office elected by the direct vote of all the people of Ireland". The 23 October 1997 edition of An Phoblacht (the official newspaper of Sinn Féin) criticised those statements as "a perfect example of partitionist thinking" and argued that "the clear import of this statement is that people in the Six Counties are not Irish, that Ireland stops at the border and that Irish society is confined to the 26 Counties".

Speaking in the Dáil on 13 April 2000, Sinn Féin's Caoimhghín Ó Caoláin said:

In the republican political tradition, to which I belong, the State is often referred to as the 26 County State. This is a conscious response to the partitionist view, prevalent for so long and still sadly widespread, that Ireland stops at the Border. The Constitution says that the name of the State is Ireland, and Éire in the Irish language. Quite against the intentions of the framers of the Constitution, this has led to an identification of Ireland with only 26 of our 32 counties in the minds of many people.

== Businesses ==
Some businesses have been accused of being "partitionist". For example, McDonald's in 2015 sold its Irish-themed McMór in the Republic of Ireland only, which garnered criticism from MLA Barry McElduff.

In 2018, the Gaelic Athletic Association were accused of partitionism in the sale of television rights. Match highlights available on Sky Sports in the Republic were not available on that channel in the North. The issued reared its head again during a Tyrone (a Northern Ireland county) win over Kerry in the semi-finals of the 2021 All-Ireland Senior Football Championship when, during extra time, RTÉ suddenly blocked viewers north of the border watching on Sky and the RTÉ Player from watching the climax of a close match in anticipation of airing an UEFA European Qualifier Preview that was scheduled to be aired. The Sinn Féin MLA for West Tyrone Declan McAleer said that "it was disappointing and not the first time this has been highlighted at RTÉ" and that he was "aware of grandparents and family members of some of the players who had their coverage cut off and it’s very disappointing."

The weather forecasting agency Met Éireann were accused of partitionism in 2019 for greying out the North on weather maps.

== See also ==
- Two nations theory (Ireland)
- People of Northern Ireland
- Irish People
- Ulster loyalism
- Ulster nationalism
- Unionism in Ireland
- West Brit
- Partition (politics)
- Detachment (territory)
- Brexit and the Irish border
- Repartition of Ireland
