= Emer Costello =

Irish former politician (born 1962)

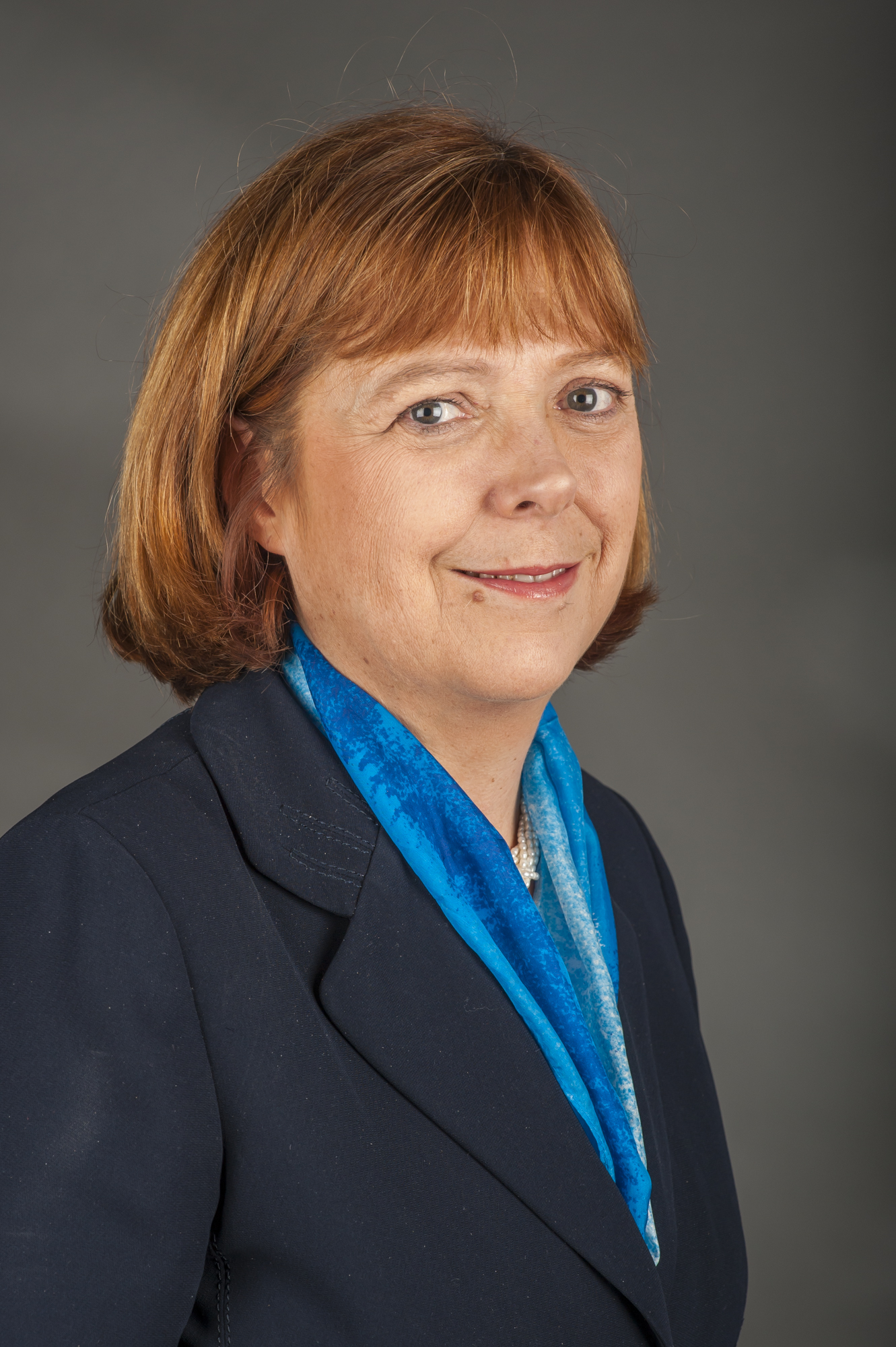
- Costello in 2014

Member of the European Parliament
- In office 30 February 2012 – 24 May 2014
- Constituency: Dublin

Lord Mayor of Dublin
- In office 15 June 2009 – 26 June 2010
- Preceded by: Eibhlin Byrne
- Succeeded by: Gerry Breen

Dublin City Councillor
- In office 14 July 2003 – 22 February 2012
- Constituency: North Inner City

Personal details
- Born: Emer Anne Malone; 3 September 1962 (age 63) Drogheda, County Louth, Ireland
- Party: Labour Party
- Spouse: Joe Costello (m. 1994)
- Children: 2
- Relatives: Mary Moran (sister)
- Education: University College Dublin
- Website: Official website

Emer Anne Costello (née Malone; born 3 September 1962) is an Irish former Labour Party politician who served as a Member of the European Parliament (MEP) for the Dublin constituency from 2012 to 2014, Lord Mayor of Dublin from 2009 to 2010 and a Dublin City Councillor for the North Inner City area from 2003 to 2012.

She is from County Louth, and has a B.A. and a H.Dip. in Education from University College Dublin.

She was first co-opted onto Dublin City Council as a member for the North Inner City area in 2003 to replace her husband, Joe Costello, who resigned following the end of the dual mandate. She was elected in 2004 and re-elected in June 2009. She was elected Lord Mayor of Dublin by a unanimous vote of the city council at its annual meeting on 15 June 2009, with the support of Fine Gael and the Green Party. Costello has observed international elections in Cambodia, South Africa and Bosnia and Herzegovina.

Her sister is former Senator Mary Moran.

Costello replaced Proinsias De Rossa in the European Parliament when he resigned as an MEP in February 2012. She lost her seat at the 2014 European Parliament election.

Civic offices
| Preceded by Eibhlin Byrne | Lord Mayor of Dublin; 2009–2010 | Succeeded by Gerry Breen |
