= Pat Upton (politician) =

Irish politician (1944–1999)

Teachta Dála
- In office November 1992 – 22 February 1999
- Constituency: Dublin South-Central

Senator
- In office 1 November 1989 – 25 November 1992
- Constituency: Agricultural Panel

Personal details
- Born: 1 September 1944 Kilrush, County Clare, Ireland
- Died: 22 February 1999 (aged 54) Dublin, Ireland
- Party: Labour Party
- Spouse: Anne Upton
- Children: 4
- Relatives: Mary Upton (sister)
- Education: University College Galway; University College Dublin

Pat Upton (1 September 1944 – 22 February 1999) was an Irish Labour Party politician and vet.

== Early life ==
He was born in Kilrush, County Clare and educated at St Flannan's College in Ennis, at University College Galway, and at University College Dublin (UCD) where he received a doctorate in veterinary medicine. He then worked as a lecturer.

== Political career ==
Upton was first elected to public office as a Labour Party member of Dublin County Council for Terenure at the 1991 local elections, where he served until the Council's abolition in 1994, and then as a member of South Dublin County Council until 1999.

He had unsuccessfully contested the Dublin South-Central constituency at the 1989 general election. However, he was then elected to the 19th Seanad on the Agricultural Panel, and became the Labour Party's leader in Seanad Éireann.

At the 1992 general election, he stood again in Dublin South-Central, and in Labour's "Spring Tide" surge at that election, Upton topped the poll with nearly 12,000 first-preference votes, a remarkable 1.48 quotas. He was re-elected at the 1997 general election with a considerably reduced vote.

In the 28th Dáil he was appointed as Labour's spokesperson on Justice, Equality and Law Reform. A leading critic of Labour's 1999 merger with the Democratic Left, he nonetheless became the party's spokesman on communications and sport after the merger.

He was a member of the Parliamentary Assembly of the Council of Europe from 1994 to 1995.

== Death ==
He died suddenly of a heart attack on 22 February 1999 at the UCD veterinary school, where he was still an occasional lecturer. He was married to Anne; and they had four children. Politicians of all parties paid glowing tributes to him an outspoken but "erudite and incisive" contributions to politics and to Irish culture.

The by-election for his Dáil seat in Dublin South-Central was held on 27 October 1999, and won for the Labour Party by his sister Mary Upton.

== Honours ==
Following his death, the University College Dublin branch of the Labour party was named in his honour due to his involvement with the college. It has since been renamed to honour the Spanish Civil War veteran Charlie Donnelly.

Dáil	Election	Deputy (Party)	Deputy (Party)	Deputy (Party)	Deputy (Party)	Deputy (Party)
13th	1948	Seán Lemass (FF)	James Larkin Jnr (Lab)	Con Lehane (CnaP)	Maurice E. Dockrell (FG)	John McCann (FF)
14th	1951	Seán Lemass (FF)	James Larkin Jnr (Lab)	Philip Brady (FF)	Maurice E. Dockrell (FG)	John McCann (FF)
15th	1954	Seán Lemass (FF)	James Larkin Jnr (Lab)	Thomas Finlay (FG)	Maurice E. Dockrell (FG)	Celia Lynch (FF)
16th	1957	Seán Lemass (FF)	Jack Murphy (Ind.)	Philip Brady (FF)	Maurice E. Dockrell (FG)	Celia Lynch (FF)
16th	1958 by-election	Seán Lemass (FF)	Patrick Cummins (FF)	Philip Brady (FF)	Maurice E. Dockrell (FG)	Celia Lynch (FF)
17th	1961	Seán Lemass (FF)	Patrick Cummins (FF)	Philip Brady (FF)	Maurice E. Dockrell (FG)	Joseph Barron (CnaP)
18th	1965	Seán Lemass (FF)	Frank Cluskey (Lab)	Philip Brady (FF)	Maurice E. Dockrell (FG)	Thomas J. Fitzpatrick (FF)
19th	1969	Richie Ryan (FG)	Ben Briscoe (FF)	Philip Brady (FF)	John O'Donovan (Lab)	4 seats 1969–1977
20th	1973	Richie Ryan (FG)	Ben Briscoe (FF)	Philip Brady (FF)	John Kelly (FG)	4 seats 1969–1977
21st	1977	Fergus O'Brien (FG)	Frank Cluskey (Lab)	Thomas J. Fitzpatrick (FF)	3 seats 1977–1981	
22nd	1981	Fergus O'Brien (FG)	Ben Briscoe (FF)	Thomas J. Fitzpatrick (FF)	Gay Mitchell (FG)	John O'Connell (Note: O'Connell served as Ceann Comhairle in the 22nd and 23rd Dáil from 1981 to 1983 and was returned automatically at the February 1982 and November 1982 general elections. He joined Fianna Fáil in January 1985.) (Ind.)
23rd	1982 (Feb)	Frank Cluskey (Lab)	Ben Briscoe (FF)	Thomas J. Fitzpatrick (FF)	Gay Mitchell (FG)	John O'Connell (Ind.)
24th	1982 (Nov)	Frank Cluskey (Lab)	Ben Briscoe (FF)	Fergus O'Brien (FG)	Gay Mitchell (FG)	John O'Connell (Ind.)
25th	1987	Frank Cluskey (Lab)	Ben Briscoe (FF)	Fergus O'Brien (FG)	Gay Mitchell (FG)	Mary Mooney (FF)
26th	1989	John O'Connell (FF)	Ben Briscoe (FF)	Fergus O'Brien (FG)	Gay Mitchell (FG)	Eric Byrne (WP)
27th	1992	John O'Connell (FF)	Ben Briscoe (FF)	Pat Upton (Lab)	Gay Mitchell (FG)	4 seats 1992–2002
27th	1994 by-election	Eric Byrne (DL)	Ben Briscoe (FF)	Pat Upton (Lab)	Gay Mitchell (FG)	4 seats 1992–2002
28th	1997	Seán Ardagh (FF)	Ben Briscoe (FF)	Pat Upton (Lab)	Gay Mitchell (FG)	4 seats 1992–2002
28th	1999 by-election	Seán Ardagh (FF)	Ben Briscoe (FF)	Mary Upton (Lab)	Gay Mitchell (FG)	4 seats 1992–2002
29th	2002	Seán Ardagh (FF)	Aengus Ó Snodaigh (SF)	Mary Upton (Lab)	Gay Mitchell (FG)	Michael Mulcahy (FF)
30th	2007	Seán Ardagh (FF)	Aengus Ó Snodaigh (SF)	Mary Upton (Lab)	Catherine Byrne (FG)	Michael Mulcahy (FF)
31st	2011	Eric Byrne (Lab)	Aengus Ó Snodaigh (SF)	Joan Collins (PBP)	Catherine Byrne (FG)	Michael Conaghan (Lab)
32nd	2016	Bríd Smith (AAA–PBP)	Aengus Ó Snodaigh (SF)	Joan Collins (Note: Founded Right to Change in May 2020.) (I4C)	Catherine Byrne (FG)	4 seats from 2016
33rd	2020	Bríd Smith (S–PBP)	Aengus Ó Snodaigh (SF)	Joan Collins (I4C)	Patrick Costello (GP)	4 seats from 2016
34th	2024	Catherine Ardagh (FF)	Aengus Ó Snodaigh (SF)	Máire Devine (SF)	Jen Cummins (SD)	4 seats from 2016
