= Royston Brady =

Irish businessman and former politician (born 1972)

Lord Mayor of Dublin
- In office 2003–2004
- Preceded by: Dermot Lacey
- Succeeded by: Michael Conaghan

Personal details
- Born: 24 August 1972 (age 54) Dublin, Ireland
- Citizenship: Irish; American
- Relatives: Cyprian Brady (brother)

Royston Mathew Brady (born 24 August 1972) is an Irish businessman and former politician, who was Lord Mayor of Dublin between 2003 and 2004. Once considered a protégé of Bertie Ahern, Brady fell foul of the Fianna Fáil party in the mid-2000s and drifted out of Irish politics. He left Ireland during the post-2008 Irish economic downturn and emigrated to Florida in the United States.

== Background and early life ==
Brady was born in Holles Street Hospital and brought up in Artane, he was one of the nine children of Richard Brady from Dublin's inner city and Doreen Lynch from Clanbrassil Street; his father was a taxi driver, showband singer and furniture dealer.

He attended the Billie Barry stage school and appeared as an extra in the film Excalibur in 1981. He was also an under-age footballer with St Vincent's GAA Club.

He attended St. Joseph's Secondary C.B.S. in Fairview and later studied at Athlone RTC, Louvain in Belgium and Boston College USA.

Brady became a member of Ógra Fianna Fáil at age 11.

== Business life ==
Having trained as a hotelier in the US and Ireland, Brady became general manager of the Royal Marine Hotel in Dún Laoghaire in June 1997. From 2000 to 2003 he worked as a consultant for training agency CERT. In 2005 he set up Alpha Recruitment, a recruitment and consultancy company specialising in the hotel and tourism sectors, which was sold for an undisclosed sum to Stepone Recruitment in 2008.

Brady left his job as general manager at Roganstown Hotel Country Club in Swords, County Dublin after highlighting alleged "illegal" bar licensing practices. Brady project managed the opening of Parnell's GAA Club, in Coolock.

Brady served on a number of boards including Dublin Port, Dublin Tourism and the Dublin Enterprise Board.

== Political career ==
Brady was elected at the 1999 Dublin City Council election as a Fianna Fáil candidate. Aged 26, he was the youngest member of the council at the time. In 2000 he served as deputy Lord Mayor of Dublin and in 2003 was elected Lord Mayor of Dublin.

On taking office, he declared that he would be a people's mayor, insisting that Dubliners deserved better than a token figurehead. He said he was making the issue of street crime in Dublin one of his top priorities and while in office he was publicly critical of the efforts of Michael McDowell, the Minister for Justice, Equality and Law Reform, against crime and at one point referred to him as a bully giving the two fingers to Dublin.

Brady worked to tackle homelessness in Dublin receiving an international honour for his efforts. He also hosted a homeless couple's wedding in the Mansion House to raise awareness of the plight of Dublin's homeless.

A Dublin football supporter, during his time Brady conferred the freedom of the city on footballer Kevin Heffernan.

Brady was a candidate at the 2004 European Parliament election in the Dublin constituency. During the campaign, he was falsely accused of lying about an incident involving his father's taxi being involved in the 1974 Dublin and Monaghan bombings. Brady was accused by the media of using the incident to obtain the sympathy of the voters. Brady's version of events was later proven correct by the Irish news media following archival research.

== Honours ==
While Lord Mayor, Brady was awarded a knighthood by the Sacred Military Constantinian Order of Saint George in recognition of Dublin City Council's work "in assisting homeless people". The award was bestowed by Cardinal Mario Pompedda at a ceremony in Áras an Uachtaráin in May 2004.

== Family and personal life ==
Brady married Michelle McConalogue from Carndonagh, County Donegal in December 2003. In 2012 Brady and his family emigrated to the United States with their children. Brady and his family became US Citizens in December 2021. Since moving to the United States, Brady has become a supporter of Republican Ron DeSantis.

His father won an All Ireland minor medal with Dublin in 1954, and his brother, Cyprian was a TD for Dublin Central from 2007 to 2011.

Civic offices
| Preceded by Dermot Lacey | Lord Mayor of Dublin; 2003–2004 | Succeeded by Michael Conaghan |
