= Joe Costello (politician) =

Irish former politician (born 1945)

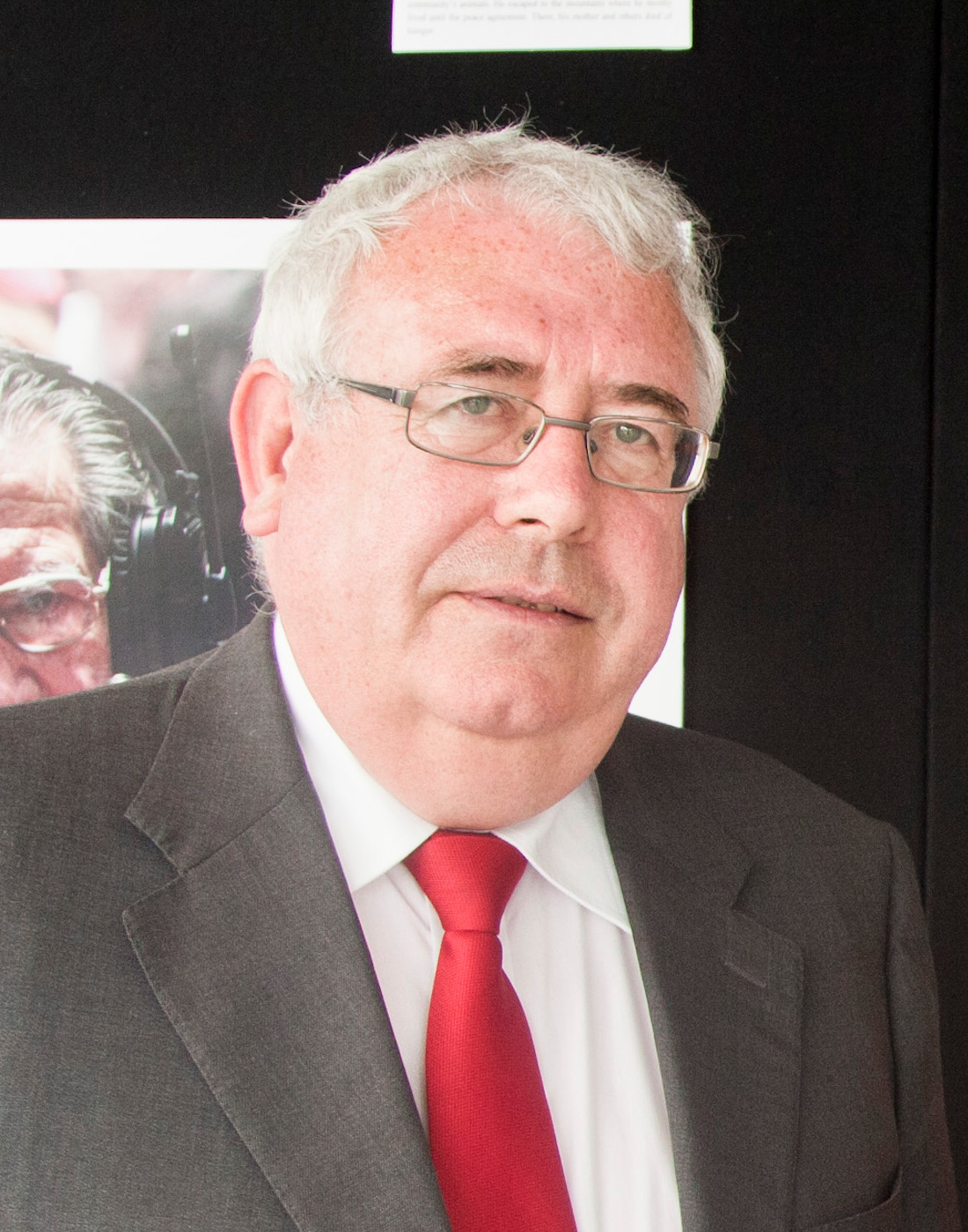

Minister of State
- 2011–2014: Foreign Affairs and Trade

Teachta Dála
- In office May 2002 – February 2016
- In office November 1992 – June 1997
- Constituency: Dublin Central

Senator
- In office 17 September 1997 – 17 May 2002
- In office 1 November 1989 – 25 November 1992
- Constituency: Administrative Panel

Personal details
- Born: 13 July 1945 (age 81) Geevagh, County Sligo, Ireland
- Party: Labour Party
- Spouse: Emer Costello (m. 1994)
- Children: 2
- Relatives: Mary Moran (sister-in-law)
- Education: St Patrick's College, Maynooth; University College Dublin

Joseph Costello (born 13 July 1945) is an Irish former Labour Party politician who was a member of Dublin City Council from 2019 to 2023. He served as a Minister of State from 2011 to 2014. He was a Teachta Dála (TD) for the Dublin Central constituency from 1992 to 1997 and 2000 to 2016.

He also served as a member of the Dublin City Council from 1999 to 2002. He was a Senator for the Administrative Panel from 1989 to 1992 and from 1997 to 2002. In July 2023, he announced his retirement from politics.

== Early life ==
Costello was born in Geevagh, County Sligo and was educated at Summerhill College, Sligo, St Patrick's College, Maynooth and University College Dublin. He worked as a secondary school teacher before becoming a full-time public representative.

== Political career ==
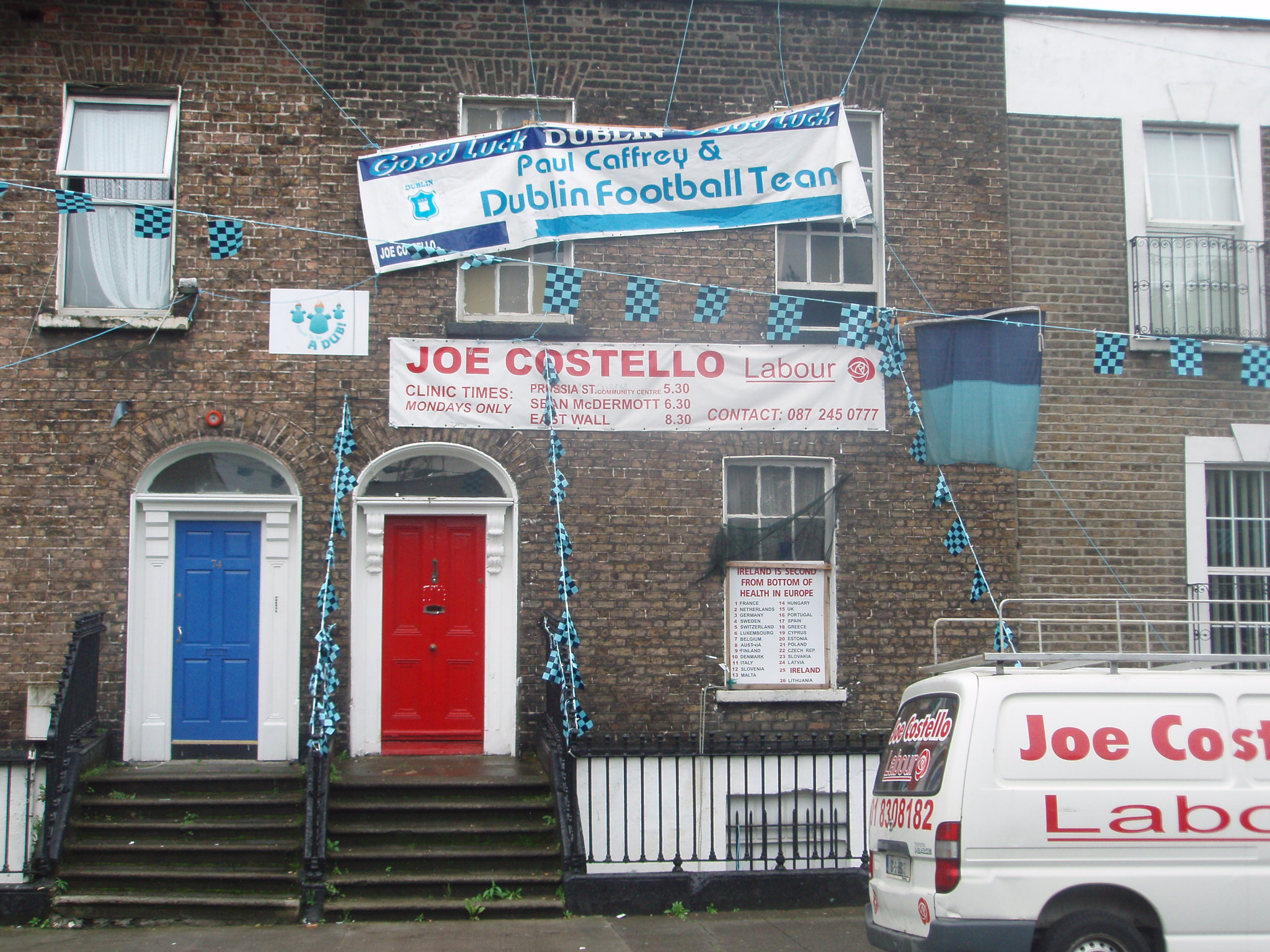
Costello's office in 2007

In 1985, along with Tony Gregory and Christy Burke, Costello was arrested for protesting alongside market traders against casual trading legislation that had been introduced; he spent a week in prison.

He joined the Labour Party in 1985, and first stood for the party in the 1987 general election; contesting the Dublin Central constituency, he received 3.2% of the vote (1,305 votes) and was the final candidate eliminated in the constituency. In 1989 he was elected to the 19th Seanad as a Senator for the Administrative Panel. He remained there until the 1992 general election when he was elected to Dáil Éireann. Costello lost his seat at the 1997 general election but was subsequently elected to the Seanad again. Costello was re-elected to the Dáil at the 2002 and 2007 general elections.

He was a member of Dublin City Council from 1999 until the end of the dual mandate led to him passing the seat to his wife Emer Costello. He was re-elected to the council in 2019.

He was director of elections for the Labour party candidate Michael D. Higgins in his presidential campaign of 2011. Higgins would win 56% of the vote in the final count and be elected president.

On 20 December 2011, he was appointed by the Fine Gael–Labour government as Minister of State at the Department of Foreign Affairs and Trade with responsibility for Trade and Development, a position he served in until 15 July 2014. He was dropped as a Minister of State in a reshuffle in July 2014. He was then appointed to the Dáil Public Accounts Committee.

At a Sinn Féin organised boxing charity fundraiser on 15 February 2014, Costello and his wife took a photo with gangland criminal Gerry Hutch. On 14 February 2016, 16 days before the 2016 general election (in which Costello was a candidate), the Irish Daily Mail published an article titled "Hypocrisy", calling Costello a hypocrite for condemning gang violence after the death of Edward Hutch (Gerry Hutch's brother) but being seen in a photograph with gang leaders. Costello responded: "...there were dozens of photographs taken. People were constantly coming in behind us into the photographs. I had no idea who was in that particular photo except myself, my wife and the lady in the front". Joan Burton, the then Tánaiste defended him and said "politicians do not know everyone they take photos with". Costello then sued the Irish Daily Mail for defamation. In May 2019, the case was settled and the Irish Daily Mail read out an apology to Costello and his wife in court.

In October 2015 on the "Saturday with Claire Byrne" RTÉ radio show, Costello mistakenly referred to Nicky Kehoe (a one-time Provisional IRA member and the Sinn Féin director of elections) as the "IRA's former chief of staff in Dublin" but made sure not to name him. The producer of the radio show pressed the "talk back button" which is a button that alerts the presenter (Claire Byrne) to intervene. Byrne did not intervene and Sinn Féin member, Eoin Ó Broin began defending Kehoe, accidentally naming him. Costello then backed down on his claim about Kehoe's high-profile involvement in the IRA. Kehoe responded to the incident by suing RTÉ for defamation. In February 2018, the court proceedings began. The jury found RTÉ was 35% at fault and Costello was 65%. Kehoe was awarded €3,500. In 2020, Costello sued the state and RTÉ because he wasn't invited to the court proceedings effectively denying him the right to defend himself, breaching the European Convention on Human Rights.

He lost his seat at the 2016 general election. He was an unsuccessful candidate for the Dublin Central constituency at the 2020 general election.

He was deputy Lord Mayor of Dublin from 2021 to 2022. In July 2023, he announced his retirement from politics, Deborah Byrne was selected by the Labour party to replace him.

== Retirement ==
In August 2023, after he had announced his retirement, he was invited by some locals to go to a meeting in Aughrim Street, Dublin about Ukrainian refugees being given help in the local sports hall. Around 300 people, some wearing masks marched up Prussia Street, blocking traffic. Costello continued talking despite the crowd being "intimidatory", until 20 of the masked group rushed him and one of them grabbed the microphone out of his hand, prompting the rest of the masked group to begin verbally abusing him. The gardaí at the event did not intervene and Costello had to leave. The following day another meeting was held but only 20 people showed up. Costello told The Irish Times that he worried about the right wing and anti-immigrant sentiment being allowed to build in certain communities.

== Personal life ==
His wife Emer Costello is a former MEP for Dublin.

| Dáil | Election | Deputy (Party) | Deputy (Party) | Deputy (Party) | Deputy (Party) |
|---|---|---|---|---|---|
| 19th | 1969 | Frank Cluskey (Lab) | Vivion de Valera (FF) | Thomas J. Fitzpatrick (FF) | Maurice E. Dockrell (FG) |
| 20th | 1973 | Frank Cluskey (Lab) | Vivion de Valera (FF) | Thomas J. Fitzpatrick (FF) | Maurice E. Dockrell (FG) |
| 21st | 1977 | Constituency abolished | | | |

| Dáil | Election | Deputy (Party) | Deputy (Party) | Deputy (Party) | Deputy (Party) | Deputy (Party) |
|---|---|---|---|---|---|---|
| 22nd | 1981 | Bertie Ahern (FF) | Michael Keating (FG) | Alice Glenn (FG) | Michael O'Leary (Lab) | George Colley (FF) |
| 23rd | 1982 (Feb) | Bertie Ahern (FF) | Michael Keating (FG) | Tony Gregory (Ind.) | Michael O'Leary (Lab) | George Colley (FF) |
| 24th | 1982 (Nov) | Bertie Ahern (FF) | Michael Keating (FG) | Tony Gregory (Ind.) | Alice Glenn (FG) | George Colley (FF) |
| 24th | 1983 by-election | Bertie Ahern (FF) | Michael Keating (FG) | Tony Gregory (Ind.) | Alice Glenn (FG) | Tom Leonard (FF) |
| 25th | 1987 | Bertie Ahern (FF) | Michael Keating (PDs) | Tony Gregory (Ind.) | Dermot Fitzpatrick (FF) | John Stafford (FF) |
| 26th | 1989 | Bertie Ahern (FF) | Pat Lee (FG) | Tony Gregory (Ind.) | Dermot Fitzpatrick (FF) | John Stafford (FF) |
| 27th | 1992 | Bertie Ahern (FF) | Jim Mitchell (FG) | Tony Gregory (Ind.) | Joe Costello (Lab) | 4 seats 1992–2016 |
| 28th | 1997 | Bertie Ahern (FF) | Jim Mitchell (FG) | Tony Gregory (Ind.) | Marian McGennis (FF) | 4 seats 1992–2016 |
| 29th | 2002 | Bertie Ahern (FF) | Dermot Fitzpatrick (FF) | Tony Gregory (Ind.) | Joe Costello (Lab) | 4 seats 1992–2016 |
| 30th | 2007 | Bertie Ahern (FF) | Cyprian Brady (FF) | Tony Gregory (Ind.) | Joe Costello (Lab) | 4 seats 1992–2016 |
| 30th | 2009 by-election | Bertie Ahern (FF) | Cyprian Brady (FF) | Maureen O'Sullivan (Ind.) | Joe Costello (Lab) | 4 seats 1992–2016 |
| 31st | 2011 | Mary Lou McDonald (SF) | Paschal Donohoe (FG) | Maureen O'Sullivan (Ind.) | Joe Costello (Lab) | 4 seats 1992–2016 |
| 32nd | 2016 | Mary Lou McDonald (SF) | Paschal Donohoe (FG) | Maureen O'Sullivan (Ind.) | 3 seats 2016–2020 | |
| 33rd | 2020 | Mary Lou McDonald (SF) | Paschal Donohoe (FG) | Gary Gannon (SD) | Neasa Hourigan (GP) | 4 seats from 2020 |
| 34th | 2024 | Mary Lou McDonald (SF) | Paschal Donohoe (FG) | Gary Gannon (SD) | Marie Sherlock (Lab) | 4 seats from 2020 |
| 34th | 2026 by-election | Mary Lou McDonald (SF) | Daniel Ennis (SD) | Gary Gannon (SD) | Marie Sherlock (Lab) | 4 seats from 2020 |
