= Paddy Bourke (politician) =

Irish politician

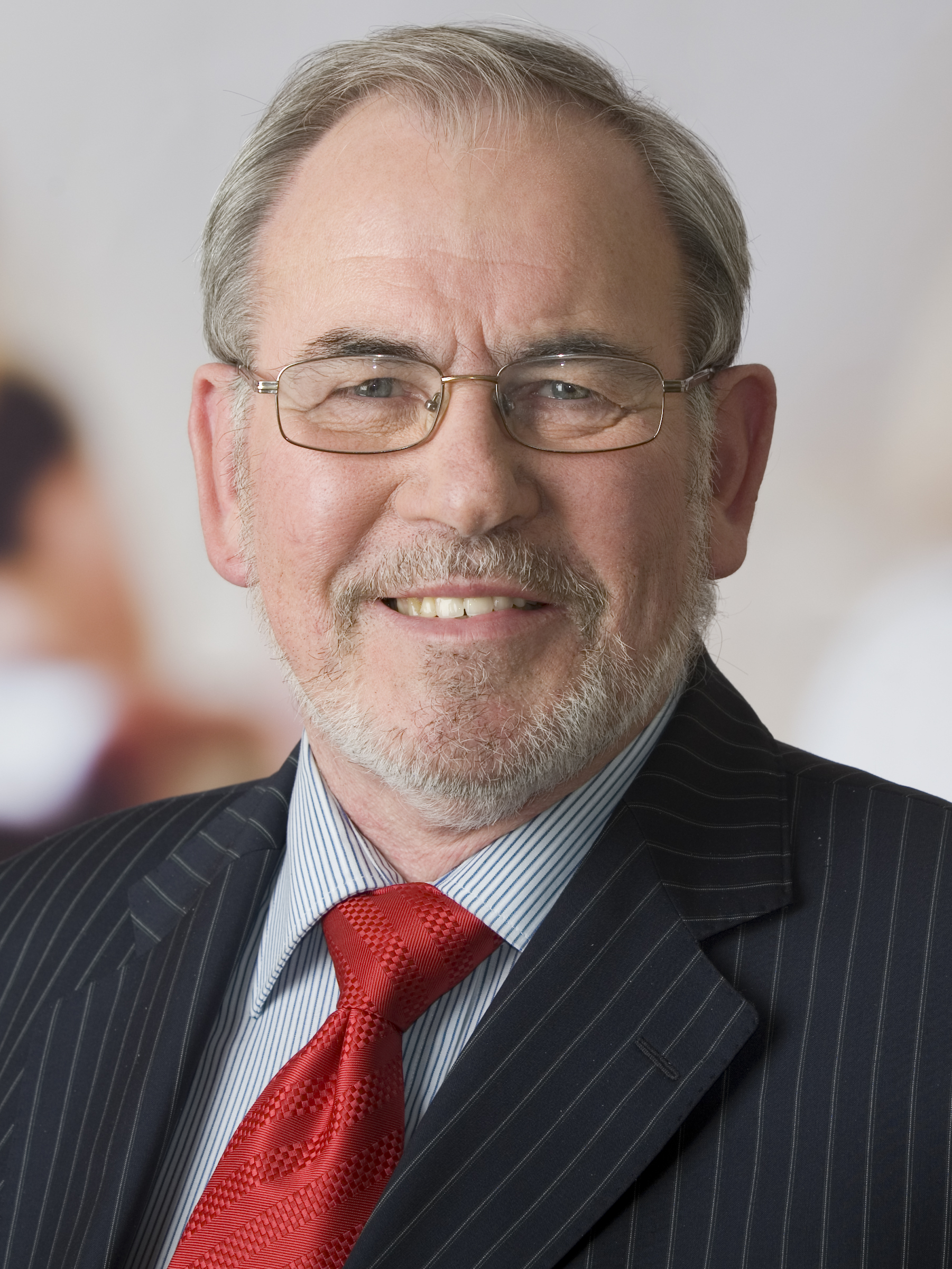
- Bourke in 2008

Dublin City Councillor
- In office 2014–2019
- Constituency: Beaumont-Donaghmede
- In office 2009–2014
- Constituency: Artane-Whitehall
- In office 2004–2009
- In office 1991–1999
- Constituency: Artane

Lord Mayor of Dublin
- In office June 2007 – June 2008
- Preceded by: Vincent Jackson
- Succeeded by: Eibhlin Byrne

Personal details
- Born: Dublin, Ireland
- Party: Independent
- Other political affiliations: Labour Party (until 2013)

Patrick Bourke is an Irish Independent politician.

He was elected as a Labour Party councillor for the Artane area in 1991. He was an unsuccessful candidate for the Seanad in 1997. He lost his seat at the 1999 local elections but was re-elected at the 2004 local elections.

He served as Lord Mayor of Dublin from 2007 to 2008. He resigned from the Labour Party in 2013 because of concerns about the government budget. He was re-elected as an independent councillor for the Beaumont-Donaghmede area in 2014.

Bourke has been reappointed to the Commissioners of Irish Lights having been first appointed in 2007, and again in 2009–2014. He is chairperson of the City of Dublin Education Training Board and a member of the governing body of DIT. He also serves as a member of the Midland and Eastern Regional Assembly and is a reserved member of the Education and Training Boards Ireland., chairing the Board of Colaiste Dhulaigh College of Further Education and Marino College.

Bourke lost his seat on Dublin City council in the 2019 council election.

Civic offices
Preceded by Vincent Jackson	Lord Mayor of Dublin; 2007–2008	Succeeded by Eibhlin Byrne
