= Politics.ie =

Irish political forum

- Website type: discussion boards
- Available in: English, Irish
- Founded: 2003
- Dissolved: 2025

Politics.ie was an Irish internet discussion forum from 2003 until 2025. It was founded by David Cochrane. The site was owned by Pie Media Ltd. David Cochrane resigned as director in August 2012. Pie Media Limited dissolved with the company closing on Wednesday the 22nd of April 2015.

== Legal action ==
Michael Daly took legal action against David Cochrane in a case involving libel. An injunction was granted, and David Cochrane acknowledged the inaccuracy of the content posted on Politics.ie without admitting liability.

== Technical issues and closure ==
The site went offline for a period in July/August 2018.

Intermittent technical problems continued throughout Q4 2018 and into 2019. In mid February 2019 A serious anomaly occurred resulting in the websites link to the forum software breaking so the server returned the file listing of the web root directory. This resulted in the hosting provider suspending the Account.

The domain expired on 15 July 2025 with the site remaining online for some time before disappearing. The last copy archived by the Wayback Machine was on 9 August 2025.

The domain was purchased by Edoms, a Bulgarian domain registrar on 2 October 2025.
