= Peter Sands (politician) =

Irish politician and trade unionist (1924–2015)

Senator
- In office 23 June 2007 – 13 September 2007
- Constituency: Nominated by the Taoiseach

Personal details
- Born: 1 May 1924 County Louth, Ireland
- Died: 17 October 2015 (aged 91) County Louth, Ireland
- Party: Fianna Fáil
- Spouse: Una Sands
- Children: 7

Peter Sands (1 May 1924 – 17 October 2015) was an Irish Fianna Fáil politician who briefly served as a member of the 22nd Seanad. He was nominated by the Taoiseach Bertie Ahern, on 23 June 2007, to fill a vacancy left by the election of Brendan Kenneally to the Dáil at the 2007 general election. He was not nominated to the 23rd Seanad.

Sands was a lifelong trade unionist and former president of the Local Government and Public Services Union. He was a director of elections for Fianna Fáil in County Louth.

Sands died on 17 October 2015.
