= Anthony Creevey =

Irish former politician

Lord Mayor of Dublin
- In office 10 June 2002 – 1 July 2002
- Preceded by: Michael Mulcahy
- Succeeded by: Dermot Lacey

Dublin City Council
- In office June 1999 – June 2004
- Constituency: Artane

Personal details
- Party: Fianna Fáil
- Other political affiliations: Labour Party (1999–2000); Democratic Left (1997–1999)

Anthony Creevey is an Irish former politician. He was a member of Dublin City Council from 1999 to 2004, and briefly served as Lord Mayor of Dublin from June to July 2002.

Creevey began his political career in Democratic Left. At the 1997 general election, he stood in the Dublin North-East constituency but he was not elected receiving 3.7% of the first preference votes. In 1999 he was elected to Dublin City Council for the Labour Party which Democratic Left had merged with in the same year. He represented the Artane area.

In 2000 Creevey joined Fianna Fáil. During his time on the city council, he was briefly Lord Mayor of Dublin from 10 June to 1 July 2002. His predecessor as Lord Mayor Michael Mulcahy was elected to Dáil Éireann at the 2002 general election, and had to resign as a councillor due to the dual mandate.

Creevey did not run for Dublin City Council in 2004, instead he ran for a seat on Naas Town Council, which he served on from 2004 to 2009.

Civic offices
Preceded by Michael Mulcahy	Lord Mayor of Dublin; Jun.–Jul. 2002	Succeeded by Dermot Lacey
