= Vincent Jackson (politician) =

Irish politician (born 1966)

Cllr Vincent Jackson
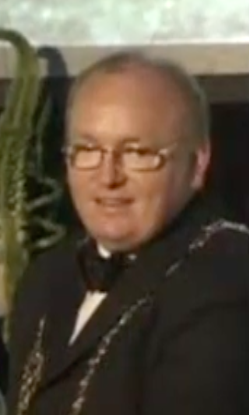
- Jackson in 2007

Dublin City Councillor
- Incumbent
- Assumed office 24 May 1991
- Constituency: Ballyfermot

Lord Mayor of Dublin
- In office 5 June 2006 – 7 June 2007
- Preceded by: Catherine Byrne
- Succeeded by: Paddy Bourke

Personal details
- Born: Vincent Noel Jackson; 1 June 1966 (age 60) Dublin, Ireland
- Party: Independent
- Spouse: Veronica Jackson (m. 2005)
- Children: 1
- Education: Dublin Institute of Technology

Vincent B. Jackson (born Vincent Noel Jackson, 1 March 1966) is an Irish independent politician who has served as a Dublin City Councillor since May 1991. He previously served as Lord Mayor of Dublin from June 2006 to June 2007.

One of 10 children, he was originally a carpenter by profession and became involved with a variety of community and youth projects in Ballyfermot in Dublin. Prior to standing in the 1991 local elections, he changed his middle name to B, which stood for Ballyfermot. He was successful in this election and was elected to Dublin City Council representing the Ballyfermot local electoral area. He was re-elected at the 1999, 2004 and 2009 elections. He unsuccessfully stood for Dáil Éireann at the 1992, 1997 and 2002 general elections.

He was elected Lord Mayor of Dublin in 2006, with the backing of Fianna Fáil, Sinn Féin and a number of independent councillors.

In 2023, Jackson spoke about his family home being targeted by anti-immigrant protesters.

Civic offices
Preceded by Catherine Byrne	Lord Mayor of Dublin; 2006–2007	Succeeded by Paddy Bourke
