= Chris Wall =

Irish politician (1942–2021)

Senator
- In office 23 June 2007 – 13 September 2007
- Constituency: Nominated by the Taoiseach

Personal details
- Born: 23 December 1942 Dublin, Ireland
- Died: 28 December 2021 (aged 79) Dublin, Ireland
- Party: Fianna Fáil
- Spouse: Myra Wall
- Children: 4
- Known for: Middle distance runner; Politician; Sports administrator

Christopher Joseph Wall (23 December 1942 – 28 December 2021) was an associate of former Taoiseach Bertie Ahern. He served as Ahern's election agent at the 2007 general election, and after the election he was nominated by the Taoiseach to serve as a Senator for the final weeks of the 22nd Seanad. He filled one of the vacancies caused by the election of four of the nominated Senators to Dáil Éireann.

A former Irish athlete, Wall served as the International Secretary for BLE (the forerunner to Athletics Ireland) from 1984 to 2000.

He died on 28 December 2021.
