= Michael Mulcahy (politician) =

Irish former politician (born 1960)

Teachta Dála
- In office May 2002 – February 2011
- Constituency: Dublin South-Central

Senator
- In office 17 February 1993 – 17 September 1997
- Constituency: Nominated by the Taoiseach

Lord Mayor of Dublin
- In office June 2001 – May 2002
- Preceded by: Maurice Ahern
- Succeeded by: Anthony Creevey

Personal details
- Born: 23 June 1960 (age 66) Dublin, Ireland
- Party: Fianna Fáil
- Parent: John Mulcahy (father)
- Education: Trinity College Dublin

Michael Mulcahy (born 23 June 1960) is an Irish former Fianna Fáil politician. He was a Teachta Dála (TD) for the Dublin South-Central constituency from 2002 to 2011.

A barrister and graduate of Trinity College Dublin, Mulcahy entered politics as a member of Dublin Corporation, where he served from 1985 to 2003. He was Lord Mayor of Dublin from 2001 to 2002. He is a son of John Mulcahy, the proprietor of The Phoenix magazine and founder of the Sunday Tribune newspaper, and Nuala Mulcahy.

He was elected to Dáil Éireann on his fifth attempt at the 2002 general election and was re-elected at the 2007 general election.

He had previously served as a Senator in the 20th Seanad, to which he was nominated by the Taoiseach, Albert Reynolds.

He lost his seat at the 2011 general election.

Civic offices
Preceded by Maurice Ahern	Lord Mayor of Dublin; 2001–2002	Succeeded by Anthony Creevey

Dáil	Election	Deputy (Party)	Deputy (Party)	Deputy (Party)	Deputy (Party)	Deputy (Party)
13th	1948	Seán Lemass (FF)	James Larkin Jnr (Lab)	Con Lehane (CnaP)	Maurice E. Dockrell (FG)	John McCann (FF)
14th	1951	Seán Lemass (FF)	James Larkin Jnr (Lab)	Philip Brady (FF)	Maurice E. Dockrell (FG)	John McCann (FF)
15th	1954	Seán Lemass (FF)	James Larkin Jnr (Lab)	Thomas Finlay (FG)	Maurice E. Dockrell (FG)	Celia Lynch (FF)
16th	1957	Seán Lemass (FF)	Jack Murphy (Ind.)	Philip Brady (FF)	Maurice E. Dockrell (FG)	Celia Lynch (FF)
16th	1958 by-election	Seán Lemass (FF)	Patrick Cummins (FF)	Philip Brady (FF)	Maurice E. Dockrell (FG)	Celia Lynch (FF)
17th	1961	Seán Lemass (FF)	Patrick Cummins (FF)	Philip Brady (FF)	Maurice E. Dockrell (FG)	Joseph Barron (CnaP)
18th	1965	Seán Lemass (FF)	Frank Cluskey (Lab)	Philip Brady (FF)	Maurice E. Dockrell (FG)	Thomas J. Fitzpatrick (FF)
19th	1969	Richie Ryan (FG)	Ben Briscoe (FF)	Philip Brady (FF)	John O'Donovan (Lab)	4 seats 1969–1977
20th	1973	Richie Ryan (FG)	Ben Briscoe (FF)	Philip Brady (FF)	John Kelly (FG)	4 seats 1969–1977
21st	1977	Fergus O'Brien (FG)	Frank Cluskey (Lab)	Thomas J. Fitzpatrick (FF)	3 seats 1977–1981	
22nd	1981	Fergus O'Brien (FG)	Ben Briscoe (FF)	Thomas J. Fitzpatrick (FF)	Gay Mitchell (FG)	John O'Connell (Note: O'Connell served as Ceann Comhairle in the 22nd and 23rd Dáil from 1981 to 1983 and was returned automatically at the February 1982 and November 1982 general elections. He joined Fianna Fáil in January 1985.) (Ind.)
23rd	1982 (Feb)	Frank Cluskey (Lab)	Ben Briscoe (FF)	Thomas J. Fitzpatrick (FF)	Gay Mitchell (FG)	John O'Connell (Ind.)
24th	1982 (Nov)	Frank Cluskey (Lab)	Ben Briscoe (FF)	Fergus O'Brien (FG)	Gay Mitchell (FG)	John O'Connell (Ind.)
25th	1987	Frank Cluskey (Lab)	Ben Briscoe (FF)	Fergus O'Brien (FG)	Gay Mitchell (FG)	Mary Mooney (FF)
26th	1989	John O'Connell (FF)	Ben Briscoe (FF)	Fergus O'Brien (FG)	Gay Mitchell (FG)	Eric Byrne (WP)
27th	1992	John O'Connell (FF)	Ben Briscoe (FF)	Pat Upton (Lab)	Gay Mitchell (FG)	4 seats 1992–2002
27th	1994 by-election	Eric Byrne (DL)	Ben Briscoe (FF)	Pat Upton (Lab)	Gay Mitchell (FG)	4 seats 1992–2002
28th	1997	Seán Ardagh (FF)	Ben Briscoe (FF)	Pat Upton (Lab)	Gay Mitchell (FG)	4 seats 1992–2002
28th	1999 by-election	Seán Ardagh (FF)	Ben Briscoe (FF)	Mary Upton (Lab)	Gay Mitchell (FG)	4 seats 1992–2002
29th	2002	Seán Ardagh (FF)	Aengus Ó Snodaigh (SF)	Mary Upton (Lab)	Gay Mitchell (FG)	Michael Mulcahy (FF)
30th	2007	Seán Ardagh (FF)	Aengus Ó Snodaigh (SF)	Mary Upton (Lab)	Catherine Byrne (FG)	Michael Mulcahy (FF)
31st	2011	Eric Byrne (Lab)	Aengus Ó Snodaigh (SF)	Joan Collins (PBP)	Catherine Byrne (FG)	Michael Conaghan (Lab)
32nd	2016	Bríd Smith (AAA–PBP)	Aengus Ó Snodaigh (SF)	Joan Collins (Note: Founded Right to Change in May 2020.) (I4C)	Catherine Byrne (FG)	4 seats from 2016
33rd	2020	Bríd Smith (S–PBP)	Aengus Ó Snodaigh (SF)	Joan Collins (I4C)	Patrick Costello (GP)	4 seats from 2016
34th	2024	Catherine Ardagh (FF)	Aengus Ó Snodaigh (SF)	Máire Devine (SF)	Jen Cummins (SD)	4 seats from 2016
