= Dermot Fitzpatrick =

Irish politician (1940–2022)

Teachta Dála
- In office May 2002 – May 2007
- In office February 1987 – November 1992
- Constituency: Dublin Central

Senator
- In office 17 September 1997 – 17 May 2002
- Constituency: Nominated by the Taoiseach

Personal details
- Born: 12 April 1940 Dublin, Ireland
- Died: 23 March 2022 (aged 81) Dublin, Ireland
- Party: Fianna Fáil
- Spouse: Mary Fitzpatrick
- Children: 4, including Mary
- Education: University College Dublin

Dermot Fitzpatrick (12 April 1940 – 23 March 2022) was an Irish Fianna Fáil politician who served as a Teachta Dála (TD) for the Dublin Central constituency from 1987 to 1992 and from 2002 to 2007. He was a Senator from 1997 to 2002, after being nominated by the Taoiseach.

He was a native of Dublin, and was educated at Coláiste Mhuire, an Irish language secondary school in the city, and at University College Dublin, from which he graduated with a degree in medicine. Prior to his entry into politics, he worked as a family doctor.

He retired at the 2007 general election. His daughter Mary Fitzpatrick was a Fianna Fáil candidate in Dublin Central for the 2007, 2011, 2016, 2020, and 2024 general elections, but was not elected.

| Dáil | Election | Deputy (Party) | Deputy (Party) | Deputy (Party) | Deputy (Party) |
|---|---|---|---|---|---|
| 19th | 1969 | Frank Cluskey (Lab) | Vivion de Valera (FF) | Thomas J. Fitzpatrick (FF) | Maurice E. Dockrell (FG) |
| 20th | 1973 | Frank Cluskey (Lab) | Vivion de Valera (FF) | Thomas J. Fitzpatrick (FF) | Maurice E. Dockrell (FG) |
| 21st | 1977 | Constituency abolished | | | |

| Dáil | Election | Deputy (Party) | Deputy (Party) | Deputy (Party) | Deputy (Party) | Deputy (Party) |
|---|---|---|---|---|---|---|
| 22nd | 1981 | Bertie Ahern (FF) | Michael Keating (FG) | Alice Glenn (FG) | Michael O'Leary (Lab) | George Colley (FF) |
| 23rd | 1982 (Feb) | Bertie Ahern (FF) | Michael Keating (FG) | Tony Gregory (Ind.) | Michael O'Leary (Lab) | George Colley (FF) |
| 24th | 1982 (Nov) | Bertie Ahern (FF) | Michael Keating (FG) | Tony Gregory (Ind.) | Alice Glenn (FG) | George Colley (FF) |
| 24th | 1983 by-election | Bertie Ahern (FF) | Michael Keating (FG) | Tony Gregory (Ind.) | Alice Glenn (FG) | Tom Leonard (FF) |
| 25th | 1987 | Bertie Ahern (FF) | Michael Keating (PDs) | Tony Gregory (Ind.) | Dermot Fitzpatrick (FF) | John Stafford (FF) |
| 26th | 1989 | Bertie Ahern (FF) | Pat Lee (FG) | Tony Gregory (Ind.) | Dermot Fitzpatrick (FF) | John Stafford (FF) |
| 27th | 1992 | Bertie Ahern (FF) | Jim Mitchell (FG) | Tony Gregory (Ind.) | Joe Costello (Lab) | 4 seats 1992–2016 |
| 28th | 1997 | Bertie Ahern (FF) | Jim Mitchell (FG) | Tony Gregory (Ind.) | Marian McGennis (FF) | 4 seats 1992–2016 |
| 29th | 2002 | Bertie Ahern (FF) | Dermot Fitzpatrick (FF) | Tony Gregory (Ind.) | Joe Costello (Lab) | 4 seats 1992–2016 |
| 30th | 2007 | Bertie Ahern (FF) | Cyprian Brady (FF) | Tony Gregory (Ind.) | Joe Costello (Lab) | 4 seats 1992–2016 |
| 30th | 2009 by-election | Bertie Ahern (FF) | Cyprian Brady (FF) | Maureen O'Sullivan (Ind.) | Joe Costello (Lab) | 4 seats 1992–2016 |
| 31st | 2011 | Mary Lou McDonald (SF) | Paschal Donohoe (FG) | Maureen O'Sullivan (Ind.) | Joe Costello (Lab) | 4 seats 1992–2016 |
| 32nd | 2016 | Mary Lou McDonald (SF) | Paschal Donohoe (FG) | Maureen O'Sullivan (Ind.) | 3 seats 2016–2020 | |
| 33rd | 2020 | Mary Lou McDonald (SF) | Paschal Donohoe (FG) | Gary Gannon (SD) | Neasa Hourigan (GP) | 4 seats from 2020 |
| 34th | 2024 | Mary Lou McDonald (SF) | Paschal Donohoe (FG) | Gary Gannon (SD) | Marie Sherlock (Lab) | 4 seats from 2020 |
| 34th | 2026 by-election | Mary Lou McDonald (SF) | Daniel Ennis (SD) | Gary Gannon (SD) | Marie Sherlock (Lab) | 4 seats from 2020 |
