= Catherine Byrne (Irish politician) =

Irish former politician (born 1956)

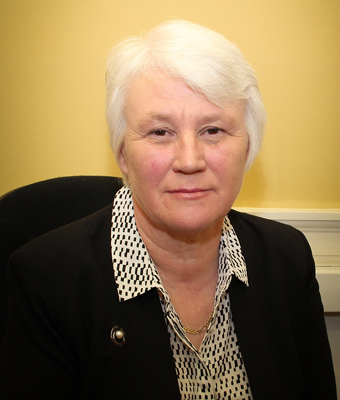
- Byrne in 2016

Minister of State
- 2016–2020: Health
- 2016–2017: Housing, Planning, Community and Local Government

Lord Mayor of Dublin
- In office 5 June 2005 – 6 June 2006
- Preceded by: Michael Conaghan
- Succeeded by: Vincent Jackson

Teachta Dála
- In office May 2007 – February 2020
- Constituency: Dublin South-Central

Personal details
- Born: 26 February 1956 (age 70) Bluebell, Dublin, Ireland
- Party: Fine Gael
- Spouse: Joseph Byrne (m. 1987)
- Children: 5
- Education: Dublin Institute of Technology

Catherine Byrne (born 26 February 1956) is an Irish former Fine Gael politician who served as a Minister of State from 2016 to 2020 and Lord Mayor of Dublin from 2005 to 2006. She served as a Teachta Dála (TD) for the Dublin South-Central constituency from 2007 to 2020.

== Political career ==
Byrne stood unsuccessfully as a candidate at the 2002 general election, she was elected on her next attempt at the 2007 general election. She was a member of Dublin City Council for the South West Inner City local electoral area. She served for a term as Lord Mayor of Dublin in 2005.

She was party deputy spokesperson on Community, Rural and Gaeltacht Affairs, with special responsibility for National Drugs Strategy from 2007 to 2010. From July 2010 to March 2011, she was spokesperson on Older Citizens.

She was the vice-chair of the Fine Gael parliamentary party from 2014 to 2016.

On 19 May 2016, Byrne was appointed by the Fine Gael–Independent government on the nomination of Taoiseach Enda Kenny as Minister of State at the Department of Health and at the Department of Housing, Planning, Community and Local Government with special responsibility for Communities and the National Drugs Strategy.

On 20 June 2017, she was appointed by the government formed by Leo Varadkar as Minister of State at the Department of Health with special responsibility for National Drugs Strategy and Health Promotion.

She lost her seat at the general election in February 2020. She continued to serve as a Minister of State until the formation of a new government on 27 June 2020.

== Personal life ==
Byrne was leader of St Michael's Folk/Gospel Group for 15 years and has completed a two-year Lay Ministry Course in All Hallows College, and also holds a Diploma in Catering. In 2006, she was granted a coat of arms, by the Chief Herald of Ireland.

Civic offices
Preceded by Michael Conaghan	Lord Mayor of Dublin; 2005–2006	Succeeded by Vincent Jackson

Dáil	Election	Deputy (Party)	Deputy (Party)	Deputy (Party)	Deputy (Party)	Deputy (Party)
13th	1948	Seán Lemass (FF)	James Larkin Jnr (Lab)	Con Lehane (CnaP)	Maurice E. Dockrell (FG)	John McCann (FF)
14th	1951	Seán Lemass (FF)	James Larkin Jnr (Lab)	Philip Brady (FF)	Maurice E. Dockrell (FG)	John McCann (FF)
15th	1954	Seán Lemass (FF)	James Larkin Jnr (Lab)	Thomas Finlay (FG)	Maurice E. Dockrell (FG)	Celia Lynch (FF)
16th	1957	Seán Lemass (FF)	Jack Murphy (Ind.)	Philip Brady (FF)	Maurice E. Dockrell (FG)	Celia Lynch (FF)
16th	1958 by-election	Seán Lemass (FF)	Patrick Cummins (FF)	Philip Brady (FF)	Maurice E. Dockrell (FG)	Celia Lynch (FF)
17th	1961	Seán Lemass (FF)	Patrick Cummins (FF)	Philip Brady (FF)	Maurice E. Dockrell (FG)	Joseph Barron (CnaP)
18th	1965	Seán Lemass (FF)	Frank Cluskey (Lab)	Philip Brady (FF)	Maurice E. Dockrell (FG)	Thomas J. Fitzpatrick (FF)
19th	1969	Richie Ryan (FG)	Ben Briscoe (FF)	Philip Brady (FF)	John O'Donovan (Lab)	4 seats 1969–1977
20th	1973	Richie Ryan (FG)	Ben Briscoe (FF)	Philip Brady (FF)	John Kelly (FG)	4 seats 1969–1977
21st	1977	Fergus O'Brien (FG)	Frank Cluskey (Lab)	Thomas J. Fitzpatrick (FF)	3 seats 1977–1981	
22nd	1981	Fergus O'Brien (FG)	Ben Briscoe (FF)	Thomas J. Fitzpatrick (FF)	Gay Mitchell (FG)	John O'Connell (Note: O'Connell served as Ceann Comhairle in the 22nd and 23rd Dáil from 1981 to 1983 and was returned automatically at the February 1982 and November 1982 general elections. He joined Fianna Fáil in January 1985.) (Ind.)
23rd	1982 (Feb)	Frank Cluskey (Lab)	Ben Briscoe (FF)	Thomas J. Fitzpatrick (FF)	Gay Mitchell (FG)	John O'Connell (Ind.)
24th	1982 (Nov)	Frank Cluskey (Lab)	Ben Briscoe (FF)	Fergus O'Brien (FG)	Gay Mitchell (FG)	John O'Connell (Ind.)
25th	1987	Frank Cluskey (Lab)	Ben Briscoe (FF)	Fergus O'Brien (FG)	Gay Mitchell (FG)	Mary Mooney (FF)
26th	1989	John O'Connell (FF)	Ben Briscoe (FF)	Fergus O'Brien (FG)	Gay Mitchell (FG)	Eric Byrne (WP)
27th	1992	John O'Connell (FF)	Ben Briscoe (FF)	Pat Upton (Lab)	Gay Mitchell (FG)	4 seats 1992–2002
27th	1994 by-election	Eric Byrne (DL)	Ben Briscoe (FF)	Pat Upton (Lab)	Gay Mitchell (FG)	4 seats 1992–2002
28th	1997	Seán Ardagh (FF)	Ben Briscoe (FF)	Pat Upton (Lab)	Gay Mitchell (FG)	4 seats 1992–2002
28th	1999 by-election	Seán Ardagh (FF)	Ben Briscoe (FF)	Mary Upton (Lab)	Gay Mitchell (FG)	4 seats 1992–2002
29th	2002	Seán Ardagh (FF)	Aengus Ó Snodaigh (SF)	Mary Upton (Lab)	Gay Mitchell (FG)	Michael Mulcahy (FF)
30th	2007	Seán Ardagh (FF)	Aengus Ó Snodaigh (SF)	Mary Upton (Lab)	Catherine Byrne (FG)	Michael Mulcahy (FF)
31st	2011	Eric Byrne (Lab)	Aengus Ó Snodaigh (SF)	Joan Collins (PBP)	Catherine Byrne (FG)	Michael Conaghan (Lab)
32nd	2016	Bríd Smith (AAA–PBP)	Aengus Ó Snodaigh (SF)	Joan Collins (Note: Founded Right to Change in May 2020.) (I4C)	Catherine Byrne (FG)	4 seats from 2016
33rd	2020	Bríd Smith (S–PBP)	Aengus Ó Snodaigh (SF)	Joan Collins (I4C)	Patrick Costello (GP)	4 seats from 2016
34th	2024	Catherine Ardagh (FF)	Aengus Ó Snodaigh (SF)	Máire Devine (SF)	Jen Cummins (SD)	4 seats from 2016
