= Gary Gannon =

Irish politician (born 1987)

Gary Gannon TD
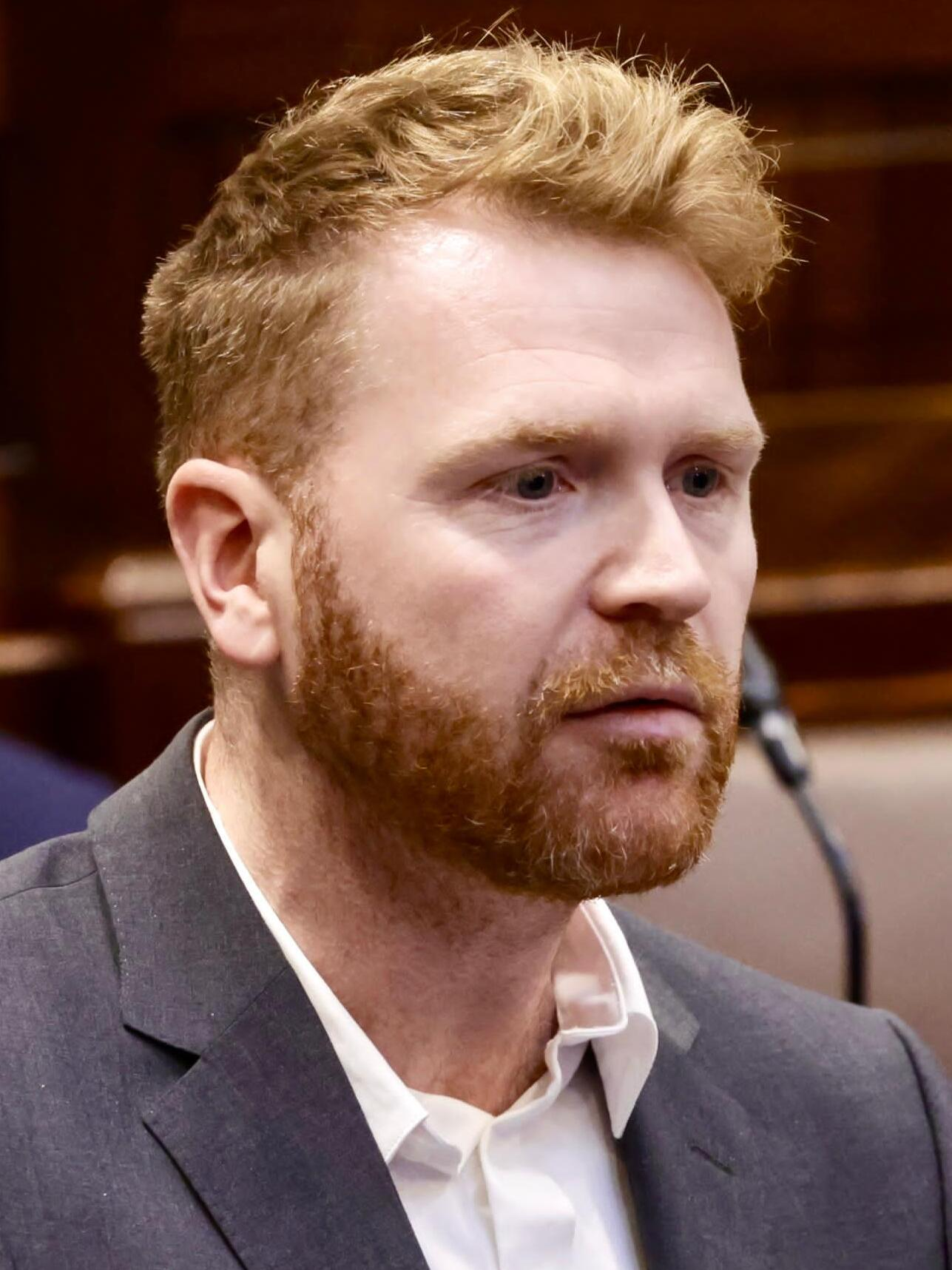
- Gannon in 2025

Teachta Dála
- Incumbent
- Assumed office February 2020
- Constituency: Dublin Central

Personal details
- Born: 18 February 1987 (age 39) Dublin, Ireland
- Party: Social Democrats
- Education: Trinity College Dublin

Gary Gannon (born 18 February 1987) is an Irish Social Democrats politician who has served as a Teachta Dála (TD) for the Dublin Central constituency since the 2020 general election and the Social Democrats Spokesperson for Justice, Migration and Home Affairs since the 2024 General Election.

He served as a Dublin City Councillor for the North Inner City constituency from 2014 to 2020.

== Background ==
Gannon was born in Dublin's North Inner City, raised in Portland Place and now lives in Glasnevin. The son of a street trader, he left school to train as a plumber. He later studied history and politics at Trinity College Dublin.

In a 2026 interview, Gannon said he was born in the Mountain View Court flats in Summerhill and lived there until around the age of seven, when his family moved to nearby Sean O'Casey Avenue. His mother worked as a street trader on Henry Street, while his father took part in the Concerned Parents Against Drugs movement, at times sleeping in makeshift huts erected to confront drug dealers operating in the area. Gannon has described the north inner city of his childhood as "a hard old place" that was nonetheless "full of lovely community". He has said his mother was expelled from school at the age of 12 and did not learn to read or write until her thirties, an experience he has cited as reflective of the effects of educational disadvantage in the area.

== Political career ==
=== Councillor ===
Gannon was involved with Tony Gregory's political group and canvassed for Maureen O'Sullivan at the 2011 general election, before deciding to run against them in 2014 amidst a row over candidate selection. His early mentor in community politics was Fergus McCabe, whom Gannon has described as his "hero". He was elected to Dublin City Council in 2014 for the North Inner City local electoral area as an independent candidate.

In September 2015, he joined the newly formed Social Democrats, having also held discussions with Sinn Féin and People Before Profit before deciding the Social Democrats had the politics closest to his own. Gannon was one of five general election candidates put forward by the Social Democrats to contest the 2016 general election. He ran in the Dublin Central constituency, losing out narrowly on a seat to Maureen O'Sullivan.

In May 2019, Gannon contested the 2019 European Parliament elections in the Dublin constituency. He was not elected. On the same day he was elected to Dublin City Council for the Cabra-Glasnevin local electoral area.

=== As a TD ===
==== 2020 to 2024 ====
Gannon again stood as the Social Democrats candidate in the Dublin Central constituency at the 2020 general election and won a seat on the 9th count.

As a TD Gannon has spoken on issues relating to access to education, and on how the lack of access to education can play into poverty and gang violence. He has also spoken about the Magdalene laundries and the need to preserve the historical significance of the sites.

In May 2021 Gannon called upon Foreign Affairs Minister Simon Coveney to expel the Israeli Ambassador to Ireland following the outbreak of the 2021 Israel–Palestine crisis.

In August 2021, following the Katherine Zappone controversy, Gannon wrote to the chair of the Oireachtas Foreign Affairs Committee Charles Flanagan to demand that the committee investigate Zappone's appointment as a special envoy to the UN.

In November 2021 Gannon introduced a Bill to the Dáil which sought to "ensure that every single student and school that receives State funding will receive the same fact-based health, relationship and sex education regardless of their school's ethos", rather than sex education being dictated by religious values. Minister for Education Norma Foley did not oppose the Bill but called for a nine-month delay on its introduction in order to give time to schools to update their curriculums.

In June 2022, Gannon was ordered to repay over €1,000 in expenses after recording the lowest attendance of any TD in the Dáil in 2021. TDs must attend a minimum of 120 days to avail of the Oireachtas travel and accommodation allowance, with Gannon having attended 109 days.

In November 2022, following protests against the housing of international protection applicants in a former ESB building in East Wall, Gannon said fringe elements of the far right were "whipping up hysteria" in the area, and that anger over the housing and cost-of-living crisis was being misplaced. He said the north inner-city community had not been properly informed about the change of use of the building, and that the State's failure to communicate with residents had allowed "more nefarious movements" to fill the gap.

Following the announcement in February 2023 that Social Democrats co-leaders Catherine Murphy and Róisín Shortall would step down, Gannon ruled himself out of the resulting leadership contest, saying his skills were best placed in "building the organisation" rather than in front-line leadership. He described eventual party leader Holly Cairns as a "generational politician".

Following the November 2023 Dublin stabbing attack and riot which occurred in his constituency, Gannon called for both Minister for Justice Helen McEntee and Garda Commissioner Drew Harris to resign from their offices as Gannon felt their positions were "untenable". Gannon described those involved in the riot as "absolute thugs" who had been "operating in the city centre of Dublin over the last two years" without consequence, and said the events should not be described as protest. While praising the gardaí who worked during the riot as "absolute heroes", he criticised the delay in deploying additional gardaí to the city centre as a "failure of operational intelligence".

==== 2024 to present ====
At the 2024 general election, Gannon was re-elected to the Dáil. He was subsequently appointed the Cathaoirleach of the Joint Committee on Drugs Use.

In May 2025, following renewed anti-immigration protests in Dublin 8 over a building on Basin Lane earmarked for use as international protection accommodation, Gannon wrote that fear, rather than hatred, was driving protests in working-class communities that felt neglected by the State. He said such communities had long been "waiting" for housing, school places and regeneration while seeing investment directed into hotels and commercial development nearby, and warned that unaddressed fear left communities vulnerable to being exploited by the far right.

In July 2025, Gannon initiated judicial review proceedings in the High Court against the Central Bank of Ireland, seeking an order compelling it to use its powers under European Union regulations to prohibit the marketing, distribution and sale of bonds issued by the state of Israel. In a draft affidavit, Gannon said investors in and sellers of Israeli bonds risked being "complicit in genocide". The Central Bank, through its solicitors, disputed that Gannon had the legal standing to bring the proceedings and said there was "no valid legal basis" for the action.

In October 2025, as Social Democrats justice spokesperson, Gannon criticised the planned amalgamation of two Garda Armed Support Unit teams based in Mullingar, County Westmeath, attributing the move to a shortage of gardaí. He called on Garda Commissioner Justin Kelly and Minister for Justice Jim O'Callaghan to address the shortage, describing the reduction in capacity as "short sighted" and warning it left both gardaí and the communities they served vulnerable.

In February 2026, Gannon apologised and paid damages to former minister for justice Alan Shatter after Gannon made a post falsely claiming Shatter had met Jeffrey Epstein.

Amid a week of fuel protests in April 2026 prompted by the cost-of-living crisis, Gannon wrote that the government was "out of touch, out of answers and out of time", criticising ministers for curtailing Dáil business on their return from the Easter recess. He criticised Minister for Justice Jim O'Callaghan's warning that the Army could be deployed, and Minister for Communities, Media and Sport Patrick O'Donovan's suggestion that media coverage of the protests be reviewed. Gannon set out Social Democrats proposals including a €400 energy credit for low and middle income households, a doubling of solar panel grants under a "Solar for All" scheme, and a mileage support scheme for essential workers.

Later that month, Gannon told the Dáil that more than 2,500 incidents of drug-related intimidation had been reported since 2021, of which only around four per cent had resulted in prosecutions, and that up to 1,000 children in the State were, at any given time, under the coercive control of criminal adults involved in the drugs trade. He said arson attacks linked to drug debt had quadrupled in four years and that poverty was "the one consistent factor" in the grooming of children into criminality. Tánaiste Simon Harris agreed that the coercion of children in this way was "particularly disgusting and heinous".

In May 2026, Gannon's Social Democrats colleague Daniel Ennis was elected to Dáil Éireann for the Dublin Central constituency in a by-election, topping the poll with almost 20% of first-preference votes before being elected on the ninth count. Gannon said the result showed people in the constituency had "bought into" the party's authenticity, and that the Social Democrats would not "compromise" on their values in any future coalition.

In July 2026, Gannon accused Minister for Justice Jim O'Callaghan of taking a "Margaret Thatcher" approach to a dispute over criminal legal aid fees, after around 100 Dublin-based solicitors said they would resign from the Criminal Legal Aid panel over changes to the payment system. Gannon said the changes had caused the criminal legal aid and court system to "grind to a halt", leading to delays with serious implications for victims of crime, and called on the minister to resume engagement with the Law Society.

Also in July 2026, the Oireachtas Joint Committee on Drugs Use, chaired by Gannon, published its final report, recommending the repeal of the Misuse of Drugs Act 1977 so as to fully decriminalise the possession of drugs for personal use, along with reforms to the spent convictions regime. The report, which followed on from the 2024 Citizens' Assembly on Drugs Use, was signed by TDs and senators from Fine Gael, Fianna Fáil, Sinn Féin, Labour and independents, and was, according to Gannon, agreed without the party political disagreement that had undermined a previous committee's similar recommendations. Tánaiste Simon Harris said in response that the government would not decriminalise drugs that "inflict misery, criminality and suffering" on communities, a reaction Gannon criticised as a "morality position" not grounded in evidence.

== Political positions ==
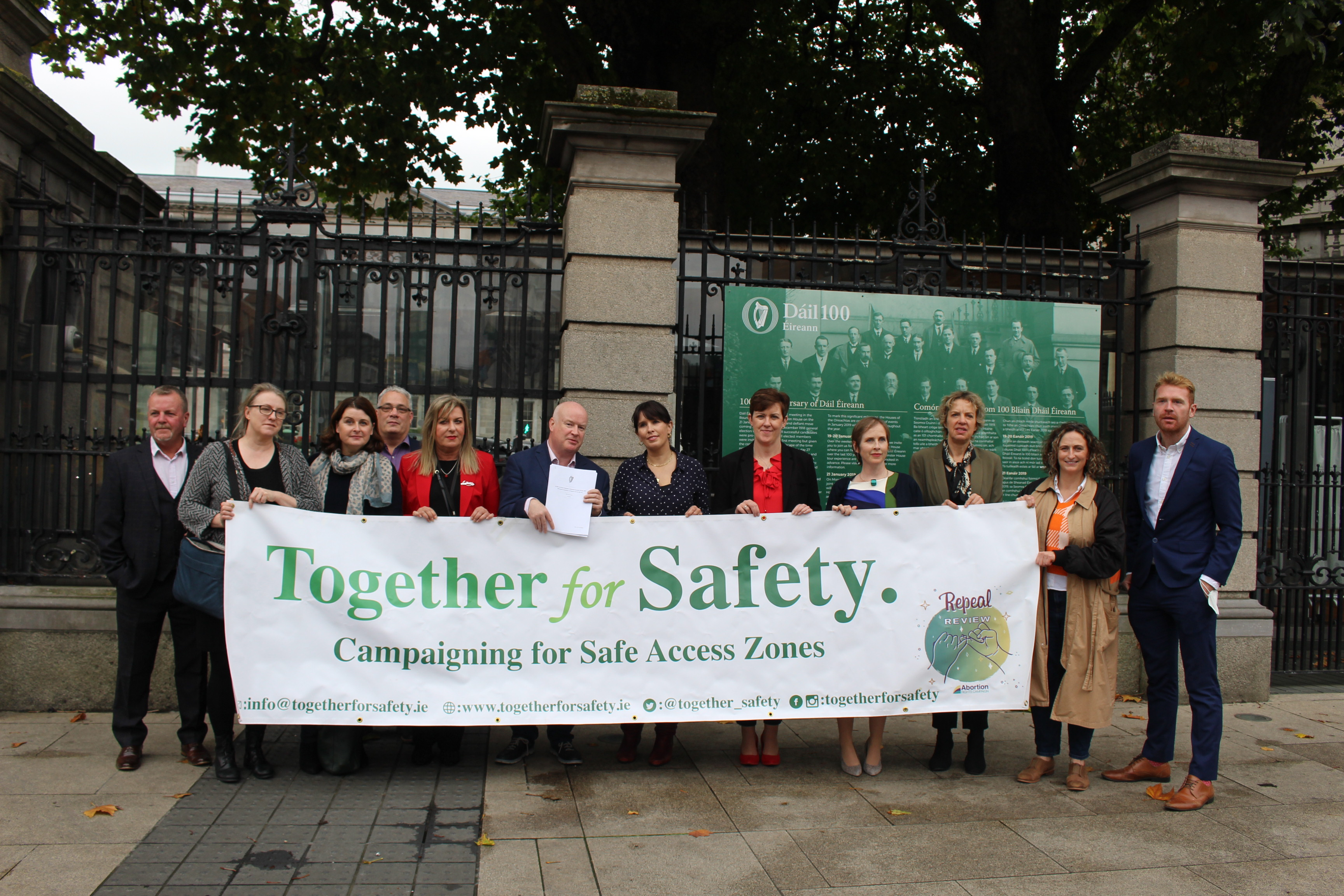
Gannon (first from right) campaigning with Sinn Fein, Labour and Social Democrats politicians for safe access zones around abortion clinics in 2021

Gannon has called for the Leaving Certificate to be radically reformed, decrying the current system as a "glorified memory test", which "can be easily manipulated depending on your income", while supporting a version that incorporates continuous assessment. Gannon supports the scrapping of Student Contributions to Universities in favour of a system of covering third level education costs through taxation.

In August 2021 Gannon called for harsher sentencing for those found guilty of committing assault with a deadly weapon.

It was also in August 2021 that Gannon stated he supports harsher sanctions by the European Union on Belarus in order to pressure Alexander Lukashenko, whom Gannon labelled a "tyrant". Gannon has spoken in support of political prisoners jailed under Lukashenko.

Gannon has advocated for reclassifying drug use as a public health issue rather than primarily a policing matter. As Cathaoirleach of the Joint Committee on Drugs Use, he opposed retaining Section 3 of the Misuse of Drugs Act 1977, arguing it functions as a "class power" that is disproportionately enforced in disadvantaged areas rather than in "a more privileged setting like a rugby club". If Section 3 were to be repealed, it would decriminalise the possession of drugs for personal use.

Gannon advocates a rehabilitation-focused approach to criminal justice, arguing that prisons should address the underlying causes of offending, particularly addiction and mental ill health, rather than perpetuate cycles of reoffending. In a piece written for Eolas magazine, he advocated support for expanding prison-based treatment and post-release services, reducing reliance on short custodial sentences for relatively minor offences, and investing in the Probation Service and supervised community sanctions as alternatives that can hold offenders accountable while reducing recidivism. While defending imprisonment for serious offences and dangerous individuals, he argued that punitive measures are ineffective when they fail to prevent further crime.

Gannon has called for Ireland to end trade and cultural engagement with Israel and to cease European Union Horizon research funding to Israeli universities for as long as Israel is, in his assessment, carrying out a genocide in Gaza. He criticised the Football Association of Ireland's decision to relocate Ireland's fixtures against Israel to Serbia rather than refuse to play the matches, describing the decision as "pathetic".

Gannon has said that opposition to immigration in working-class areas is frequently driven by fear of further neglect by the State rather than by hatred, and has criticised the far right for exploiting communities' grievances over housing and public services. He has called for greater regulation of social media recommendation algorithms, and left Twitter over concerns about the risks posed to children by the platform's Grok artificial intelligence chatbot.

On housing, Gannon has advocated for the establishment of a state construction company to build homes on land designated as affordable, a tax on landowners who leave land undeveloped, and a ban on developments built exclusively for the private rental market, alongside a multi-year rent freeze.

Gannon supports removing religious instruction from core school hours, has criticised the extent of religious patronage of schools in Ireland, and opposes church ownership of publicly funded healthcare facilities such as the National Maternity Hospital. He has said religious orders that have not paid redress to survivors of institutional abuse should have their assets seized by the State.

Gannon has said the Social Democrats would enter government only where the party could secure agreement on its five stated priority areas of housing, healthcare, childcare, climate and disability, describing them as "dealbreakers" it would not compromise on.

== Personal life ==
In February 2024, Gannon disclosed that he had been diagnosed with attention deficit hyperactivity disorder (ADHD) shortly before Christmas 2023, at the age of 36. He said he had also experienced depression and had attended counselling, and described being "near the point of burnout" by the time he was elected to the Dáil in 2020. Gannon said he was fortunate to have been able to access private healthcare in order to obtain his diagnosis, and expressed frustration that not everyone in Ireland could do the same.

Gannon's older brother, Brian, played football for Shelbourne, and his younger twin brothers, Alan and Paul, also played to a high level; Gannon himself played for Sheriff Youth Club.

Gannon has acknowledged that he previously used illegal drugs recreationally, stating that he had taken cocaine and MDMA after leaving school and while attending Trinity College Dublin. He said he chose to speak openly about his past at the beginning of the Oireachtas drugs committee's work because he believed it was important to recognise drug use as a reality experienced by many people, rather than deny it. At the same time, Gannon stressed that he did not want his comments to be seen as normalising or glamorising drug use. He said he considered himself fortunate not to have developed an addiction or become involved in criminality, contrasting his own experience with that of others from his childhood community, where drug use was often linked to trauma rather than recreation. He argued that many people use drugs recreationally, but that in disadvantaged communities drug use is frequently rooted in deeper social and personal problems.

== Election results ==
Elections to the Dáil
| Party | Election | | FPv | FPv% | Result |
|---|---|---|---|---|---|
| Social Democrats | Dublin Central | 2016 | 2,307 | 9.7 | Eliminated on count 11/11 |
| Social Democrats | Dublin Central | 2020 | 2,912 | 9.3 | Elected on count 9/9 |
| Social Democrats | Dublin Central | 2024 | 4,353 | 13.3 | Elected on count 8/11 |

Elections to Dublin City Council
| Party | Election | | FPv | FPv% | Result |
|---|---|---|---|---|---|
| Independent | North Inner City | 2014 | 7.2 | 741 | Elected on count 13/13 |
| Social Democrats | Cabra–Glasnevin | 2019 | 10.3 | 1,662 | Elected on count 9/15 |

| Dáil | Election | Deputy (Party) | Deputy (Party) | Deputy (Party) | Deputy (Party) |
|---|---|---|---|---|---|
| 19th | 1969 | Frank Cluskey (Lab) | Vivion de Valera (FF) | Thomas J. Fitzpatrick (FF) | Maurice E. Dockrell (FG) |
| 20th | 1973 | Frank Cluskey (Lab) | Vivion de Valera (FF) | Thomas J. Fitzpatrick (FF) | Maurice E. Dockrell (FG) |
| 21st | 1977 | Constituency abolished | | | |

| Dáil | Election | Deputy (Party) | Deputy (Party) | Deputy (Party) | Deputy (Party) | Deputy (Party) |
|---|---|---|---|---|---|---|
| 22nd | 1981 | Bertie Ahern (FF) | Michael Keating (FG) | Alice Glenn (FG) | Michael O'Leary (Lab) | George Colley (FF) |
| 23rd | 1982 (Feb) | Bertie Ahern (FF) | Michael Keating (FG) | Tony Gregory (Ind.) | Michael O'Leary (Lab) | George Colley (FF) |
| 24th | 1982 (Nov) | Bertie Ahern (FF) | Michael Keating (FG) | Tony Gregory (Ind.) | Alice Glenn (FG) | George Colley (FF) |
| 24th | 1983 by-election | Bertie Ahern (FF) | Michael Keating (FG) | Tony Gregory (Ind.) | Alice Glenn (FG) | Tom Leonard (FF) |
| 25th | 1987 | Bertie Ahern (FF) | Michael Keating (PDs) | Tony Gregory (Ind.) | Dermot Fitzpatrick (FF) | John Stafford (FF) |
| 26th | 1989 | Bertie Ahern (FF) | Pat Lee (FG) | Tony Gregory (Ind.) | Dermot Fitzpatrick (FF) | John Stafford (FF) |
| 27th | 1992 | Bertie Ahern (FF) | Jim Mitchell (FG) | Tony Gregory (Ind.) | Joe Costello (Lab) | 4 seats 1992–2016 |
| 28th | 1997 | Bertie Ahern (FF) | Jim Mitchell (FG) | Tony Gregory (Ind.) | Marian McGennis (FF) | 4 seats 1992–2016 |
| 29th | 2002 | Bertie Ahern (FF) | Dermot Fitzpatrick (FF) | Tony Gregory (Ind.) | Joe Costello (Lab) | 4 seats 1992–2016 |
| 30th | 2007 | Bertie Ahern (FF) | Cyprian Brady (FF) | Tony Gregory (Ind.) | Joe Costello (Lab) | 4 seats 1992–2016 |
| 30th | 2009 by-election | Bertie Ahern (FF) | Cyprian Brady (FF) | Maureen O'Sullivan (Ind.) | Joe Costello (Lab) | 4 seats 1992–2016 |
| 31st | 2011 | Mary Lou McDonald (SF) | Paschal Donohoe (FG) | Maureen O'Sullivan (Ind.) | Joe Costello (Lab) | 4 seats 1992–2016 |
| 32nd | 2016 | Mary Lou McDonald (SF) | Paschal Donohoe (FG) | Maureen O'Sullivan (Ind.) | 3 seats 2016–2020 | |
| 33rd | 2020 | Mary Lou McDonald (SF) | Paschal Donohoe (FG) | Gary Gannon (SD) | Neasa Hourigan (GP) | 4 seats from 2020 |
| 34th | 2024 | Mary Lou McDonald (SF) | Paschal Donohoe (FG) | Gary Gannon (SD) | Marie Sherlock (Lab) | 4 seats from 2020 |
| 34th | 2026 by-election | Mary Lou McDonald (SF) | Daniel Ennis (SD) | Gary Gannon (SD) | Marie Sherlock (Lab) | 4 seats from 2020 |
