= Dublin Central =

Dáil constituency (1969–1977, 1981–present)

- Dáil constituency
- Location of Dublin Central within County Dublin
- Interactive map of constituency boundaries since the 2024 general election
- Major settlements: Cabra; Dublin (north inner city); Drumcondra; East Wall; Phibsborough; Stoneybatter

Current constituency
- Created: 1981
- Seats: 5 (1981–1992); 4 (1992–2016); 3 (2016–2020); 4 (2020–)
- TDs: Daniel Ennis (SD); Gary Gannon (SD); Mary Lou McDonald (SF); Marie Sherlock (Lab)
- Local government area: Dublin City
- EP constituency: Dublin

Dublin Central
- Former Dáil constituency

Former constituency
- Created: 1969
- Abolished: 1977
- Seats: 4
- Local government area: Dublin City

Dublin Central is a parliamentary constituency represented in Dáil Éireann, the lower house of the Irish parliament or Oireachtas. The constituency elects four deputies (Teachtaí Dála, commonly known as TDs) on the system of proportional representation by means of the single transferable vote (PR-STV).

== Constituency profile ==
Dublin Central is regarded as one of the most social and ethnically diverse constituencies in Ireland. It contains Dublin's main shopping district and financial areas. The constituency consists of largely traditional working class areas such as East Wall, North Strand, Summerhill, Ballybough, Sheriff Street and Cabra with more suburban middle class Glasnevin and Drumcondra on the northern fringes of the constituency.

Former Taoiseach Bertie Ahern won the first seat in the constituency at every election from its creation in 1981 until his retirement in 2011. Such was Ahern's pull in the constituency that he was always able to get at least one running mate also elected, and at the peak of Fianna Fáil popularity in the constituency in the late 1980s, three out of five seats were held by the party. However, Fianna Fáil has not been represented in the constituency since the 2011 general election and the end of the Celtic Tiger.

During the 1980s and 1990s, the remaining seat swung to left-wing candidates such as those of the Labour Party or left-wing independents such as Tony Gregory. In the 2020s, the constituency became a hub of centre-left TDs.

== Boundaries ==
A Dublin Central constituency was created for the first time in 1969 and used at the 1969 and 1973 general elections. It originally spanned both sides of the River Liffey and took in inner city Dublin. It was abolished in 1977, and recreated with different boundaries in 1981. It is now exclusively on the northside of the Liffey. The Dublin Central constituency is located in the north inner city and suburbs of Dublin and encompasses an area to the north side of the river Liffey including: Stoneybatter, Mountjoy Square, Phibsborough, Cabra, Dorset Street, Henrietta Street, O'Connell Street, Arbour Hill, Navan Road, Glasnevin, North Wall, East Wall and Drumcondra.

The Electoral (Amendment) Act 2023 defines the constituency as:

"In the city of Dublin the electoral divisions of:

Arran Quay A, Arran Quay B, Arran Quay C, Arran Quay D, Arran Quay E, Ballybough A, Ballybough B, Botanic A, Botanic B, Botanic C, Cabra East A, Cabra East B, Cabra East C, Cabra West A, Cabra West B, Cabra West C, Cabra West D, Drumcondra South A, Drumcondra South B, Drumcondra South C, Inns Quay A, Inns Quay B, Inns Quay C, Mountjoy A, Mountjoy B, North City, North Dock A, North Dock B, North Dock C, Rotunda A, Rotunda B."

Changes to the Dublin Central constituency
Years	TDs	Boundaries	Notes
1969–1977	4	In the county borough of Dublin, the wards of The Inns Quay, Rotunda, Usher's and Wood Quay wards; that part of Arran Quay ward which is not included in the constituency of Dublin North-West; that part of Merchants Quay ward which is not included in the constituency of Dublin South-West; and that part of Royal Exchange ward lying to the west of a line drawn as follows: commencing at the junction of Suffolk Street with the ward boundary, thence in a north-westerly direction along Suffolk Street to its junction with Andrew Street, thence commencing in a south-westerly direction and proceeding along Andrew Street to its junction with Exchequer Street, thence in a westerly direction along Exchequer Street to its junction with South Great George's Street, thence commencing in a southerly direction and proceeding along South Great George's Street, Aungier Street, Redmond's Hill and Wexford Street to its junction with the ward boundary.	Transfer of Inns Quay, Rotunda and part of Arran Quay from Dublin North-Central; transfer of Usher's, Wood Quay and parts of Merchants Quay and Royal Exchange from Dublin South-Central.
1977–1981	—	Constituency abolished	Transfer of Inns Quay and parts of Arran Quay to Dublin Cabra; transfer of Rotunda to Dublin North-Central; transfer of Usher's, Wood Quay and parts of Merchants Quay and Royal Exchange to Dublin South-Central.
1981–1987	5	In the county borough of Dublin, the wards of Arran Quay A, Arran Quay B, Arran Quay C, Arran Quay D, Arran Quay E, Ballybough A, Ballybough B, Cabra East A, Cabra East B, Cabra East C, Cabra West B, Clontarf West D, Clontarf West E, Drumcondra South A, Drumcondra South B, Drumcondra South C, Glasnevin A, Glasnevin B, Inns Quay A, Inns Quay B, Inns Quay C, Mountjoy A, Mountjoy B, North City, North Dock A, North Dock B, North Dock C, Rotunda A, Rotunda B; and those parts of the wards of Cabra West A and Cabra West C situated east of a line drawn as follows: commencing at the point adjacent to the southern boundary of the Dominican Convent, Cabra, where the boundary of the county borough of Dublin intersects the centre of Ratoath Road, thence in a southerly direction along the centre of Ratoath Road to its junction with the Navan Road, thence in a southerly direction along the imaginary southerly projection of the centre of Ratoath Road to the intersection of the said imaginary projection by the southern boundary of the ward of Cabra West C.	Transfer of Arran Quay A, B, C, D and E, Cabra East A, B and C, Cabra West B, Inns Quay B and C, and parts of Cabra West A and C from Dublin Cabra; Drumcondra South C, Glasnevin A and B, Inns Quay A from Dublin Finglas; and Ballybough A and B, Clontarf West D and E, Drumcondra South A and B, Mountjoy A and B, North City, North Dock A, B and C, Rotunda A and B from Dublin North-Central.
1987–1992	5	In the county borough of Dublin, the wards of Arran Quay A, Arran Quay B, Arran Quay C, Arran Quay D, Arran Quay E, Ballybough A, Ballybough B, Cabra East A, Cabra East B, Cabra East C, Cabra West A, Cabra West B, Cabra West C, Cabra West D, Cabra West E, Clontarf West D, Clontarf West E, Drumcondra South A, Drumcondra South B, Drumcondra South C, Glasnevin A, Glasnevin B, Inns Quay A, Inns Quay B, Inns Quay C, Mountjoy A, Mountjoy B, North City, North Dock A, North Dock B, North Dock C, Rotunda A, Rotunda B.	Transfer of the wards of Cabra West D and E and the balance of the wards of Cabra West A and C from Dublin West.
1992–1997	4	In the county borough of Dublin, the wards of Arran Quay A, Arran Quay B, Arran Quay C, Arran Quay D, Arran Quay E, Ashtown A, Ashtown B, Botanic C, Cabra East B, Cabra East C, Cabra West B, Cabra West C, Cabra West D, Chapelizod, Decies, Inchicore A, Inns Quay A, Inns Quay B, Inns Quay C, Kilmainham A, Kilmainham B, Kilmainham C, Mountjoy A, Mountjoy B, North City, North Dock B, North Dock C, Phoenix Park, Rotunda A, Rotunda B, Ushers A, Ushers F; and those parts of the wards of Cabra East A, and Cabra West A situated south of a line drawn along the Royal Canal.	Transfer to Dublin North-Central of the Marino - Fairview - North Strand area; transfer to Dublin North-West of the area bounded on the south by the Royal Canal, lona Road and St Alphonsus Road and on the east by Drumcondra Road; Transfer from Dublin West of the Ashtown, Phoenix Park, Islandbridge, Kilmainham, Inchicore, Ballyfermot (part) and Chapelizod areas.
1997–2002	4	In the city of Dublin, the electoral divisions of Arran Quay A, Arran Quay B, Arran Quay C, Arran Quay D, Arran Quay E, Ashtown A, Ashtown B, Cabra East B, Cabra East C, Cabra West B, Cabra West C, Cabra West D, Chapelizod, Cherry Orchard A, Cherry Orchard B, Cherry Orchard C, Decies, Drumfinn, Inchicore A, Inns Quay B, Inns Quay C, Kilmainham A, Kilmainham B, Kilmainham C, Kylemore, Mountjoy A, Mountjoy B, North City, North Dock C, Phoenix Park, Rotunda A, Rotunda B, Ushers A, Ushers F; and that part of the ward of Cabra West A situated south of a line drawn along the Royal Canal, and that part of the ward of Inns Quay A situated south of a line drawn along the North Circular Road.	Transfer of the Phibsboro/Drumcondra area to Dublin North-West; transfer the North Docks area to Dublin North-Central; transfer of the Ballyfermot/Cherry Orchard area from Dublin West.
2002–2007	4	In the city of Dublin, the electoral divisions of Arran Quay A, Arran Quay B, Arran Quay C, Arran Quay D, Arran Quay E, Ashtown A, Ashtown B, Ballybough A, Ballybough B, Botanic A, Botanic B, Botanic C, Cabra East A, Cabra East B, Cabra East C, Cabra West A, Cabra West B, Cabra West C, Cabra West D, Drumcondra South B, Drumcondra South C, Inns Quay A, Inns Quay B, Inns Quay C, Mountjoy A, Mountjoy B, North City, North Dock A, North Dock B, North Dock C, Phoenix Park, Rotunda A, Rotunda B.	Transfer of Ballyfermot, Inchicore and Kilmainham area to Dublin South-Central; transfer of Ballybough and North Docks area from Dublin North-Central; transfer of parts of Cabra and Drumcondra from Dublin North-West.
2007–2011	4	In the city of Dublin, the electoral divisions of Arran Quay A, Arran Quay B, Arran Quay C, Arran Quay D, Arran Quay E, Ashtown A, Ashtown B, Ballybough A, Ballybough B, Botanic A, Botanic B, Botanic C, Cabra East A, Cabra East B, Cabra East C, Cabra West A, Cabra West B, Cabra West C, Cabra West D, Drumcondra South B, Drumcondra South C, Inns Quay A, Inns Quay B, Inns Quay C, Mountjoy A, Mountjoy B, North City, North Dock A, North Dock B, North Dock C, Rotunda A, Rotunda B; and that part of the electoral division of Phoenix Park situated north of a line drawn along Chapelizod Road, Conyngham Road and Parkgate Street.	Transfer of Phoenix Park (part south of Chapelizod Road and Conyngham Road and Parkgate Street) to Dublin South-Central.
2016–2020	3	In the city of Dublin, the electoral divisions of Arran Quay A, Arran Quay B, Arran Quay C, Arran Quay D, Arran Quay E, Ballybough A, Ballybough B, Cabra East A, Cabra East B, Cabra East C, Cabra West A, Cabra West B, Cabra West C, Cabra West D, Drumcondra South B, Inns Quay A, Inns Quay B, Inns Quay C, Mountjoy A, Mountjoy B, North City, North Dock A, North Dock B, North Dock C, Rotunda A, Rotunda B.	Transfer of Ashtown A, Ashtown B and remaining part of Phoenix Park to Dublin West; Transfer of Botanic A, Botanic B, Botanic C and Drumcondra South C to Dublin North-West.
2020–	4	In the city of Dublin, the electoral divisions of Arran Quay A, Arran Quay B, Arran Quay C, Arran Quay D, Arran Quay E, Ballybough A, Ballybough B, Botanic A, Botanic B, Botanic C, Cabra East A, Cabra East B, Cabra East C, Cabra West A, Cabra West B, Cabra West C, Cabra West D, Drumcondra South A, Drumcondra South B, Drumcondra South C, Inns Quay A, Inns Quay B, Inns Quay C, Mountjoy A, Mountjoy B, North City, North Dock A, North Dock B, North Dock C, Rotunda A, Rotunda B.	Transfer of Botanic A, Botanic B, Botanic C and Drumcondra South C from Dublin North-West; transfer of Drumcondra South A from Dublin Bay North.

== TDs ==
=== TDs 1969–1977 ===
Teachtaí Dála (TDs) for Dublin Central 1969–1977
Key to parties: FF = Fianna Fáil; FG = Fine Gael; Lab = Labour
Dáil	Election	Deputy (Party)	Deputy (Party)	Deputy (Party)	Deputy (Party)
19th	1969	Frank Cluskey (Lab)	Vivion de Valera (FF)	Thomas J. Fitzpatrick (FF)	Maurice E. Dockrell (FG)
20th	1973	Frank Cluskey (Lab)	Vivion de Valera (FF)	Thomas J. Fitzpatrick (FF)	Maurice E. Dockrell (FG)
21st	1977	Constituency abolished			

Note: The columns in this table are used only for presentational purposes, and no significance should be attached to the order of columns. For details of the order in which seats were won at each election, see the detailed results of that election.

=== TDs since 1981 ===
Teachtaí Dála (TDs) for Dublin Central 1981–
Key to parties: FF = Fianna Fáil; FG = Fine Gael; GP = Green; Ind. = Independent; Lab = Labour; PDs = Progressive Democrats; SF = Sinn Féin; SD = Social Democrats
Dáil	Election	Deputy (Party)	Deputy (Party)	Deputy (Party)	Deputy (Party)	Deputy (Party)
22nd	1981	Bertie Ahern (FF)	Michael Keating (FG)	Alice Glenn (FG)	Michael O'Leary (Lab)	George Colley (FF)
23rd	1982 (Feb)	Bertie Ahern (FF)	Michael Keating (FG)	Tony Gregory (Ind.)	Michael O'Leary (Lab)	George Colley (FF)
24th	1982 (Nov)	Bertie Ahern (FF)	Michael Keating (FG)	Tony Gregory (Ind.)	Alice Glenn (FG)	George Colley (FF)
24th	1983 by-election	Bertie Ahern (FF)	Michael Keating (FG)	Tony Gregory (Ind.)	Alice Glenn (FG)	Tom Leonard (FF)
25th	1987	Bertie Ahern (FF)	Michael Keating (PDs)	Tony Gregory (Ind.)	Dermot Fitzpatrick (FF)	John Stafford (FF)
26th	1989	Bertie Ahern (FF)	Pat Lee (FG)	Tony Gregory (Ind.)	Dermot Fitzpatrick (FF)	John Stafford (FF)
27th	1992	Bertie Ahern (FF)	Jim Mitchell (FG)	Tony Gregory (Ind.)	Joe Costello (Lab)	4 seats 1992–2016
28th	1997	Bertie Ahern (FF)	Jim Mitchell (FG)	Tony Gregory (Ind.)	Marian McGennis (FF)	4 seats 1992–2016
29th	2002	Bertie Ahern (FF)	Dermot Fitzpatrick (FF)	Tony Gregory (Ind.)	Joe Costello (Lab)	4 seats 1992–2016
30th	2007	Bertie Ahern (FF)	Cyprian Brady (FF)	Tony Gregory (Ind.)	Joe Costello (Lab)	4 seats 1992–2016
30th	2009 by-election	Bertie Ahern (FF)	Cyprian Brady (FF)	Maureen O'Sullivan (Ind.)	Joe Costello (Lab)	4 seats 1992–2016
31st	2011	Mary Lou McDonald (SF)	Paschal Donohoe (FG)	Maureen O'Sullivan (Ind.)	Joe Costello (Lab)	4 seats 1992–2016
32nd	2016	Mary Lou McDonald (SF)	Paschal Donohoe (FG)	Maureen O'Sullivan (Ind.)	3 seats 2016–2020	
33rd	2020	Mary Lou McDonald (SF)	Paschal Donohoe (FG)	Gary Gannon (SD)	Neasa Hourigan (GP)	4 seats from 2020
34th	2024	Mary Lou McDonald (SF)	Paschal Donohoe (FG)	Gary Gannon (SD)	Marie Sherlock (Lab)	4 seats from 2020
34th	2026 by-election	Mary Lou McDonald (SF)	Daniel Ennis (SD)	Gary Gannon (SD)	Marie Sherlock (Lab)	4 seats from 2020

Note: The columns in this table are used only for presentational purposes, and no significance should be attached to the order of columns. For details of the order in which seats were won at each election, see the detailed results of that election.

== Elections ==
*: Outgoing TD

=== 2026 by-election ===
2026 by-election: Dublin Central
Party	Candidate	FPv%	Count								
Party	Candidate	FPv%	1	2	3	4	5	6	7	8	9
Social Democrats	Daniel Ennis	19.7	4,903	4,954	5,049	5,512	6,383	6,509	7,681	8,306	12,050
Sinn Féin	Janice Boylan	17.5	4,348	4,416	4,484	4,587	5,017	5,373	5,569	7,210	7,787
Green	Janet Horner	11.7	2,907	2,958	3,052	3,632	4,010	4,058	5,272	5,452	
Independent	Gerry Hutch	11.3	2,817	2,872	2,907	2,923	2,959	4,349	4,466		
Fine Gael	Ray McAdam	10.7	2,659	2,724	3,277	3,475	3,500	3,614			
Independent	Malachy Steenson	9.4	2,342	2,542	2,596	2,614	2,641				
PBP–Solidarity	Eoghan Ó Ceannabháin	6.8	1,681	1,719	1,744	1,853					
Labour	Ruth O'Dea	5.8	1,454	1,481	1,568						
Fianna Fáil	John Stephens	4.2	1,049	1,120							
Aontú	Ian Noel Smyth	2.0	505								
Independent	Mannix Flynn	0.6	157								
Independent	Tony Corrigan	0.1	30								
Independent	Colm Flood	0.0	10								
Independent	John O'Leary	0.0	7								
Electorate: 57,619 Valid: 24,869 Spoilt: 176 Quota: 12,435 Turnout: 25,045 (43.5%)

=== 2024 general election ===
2024 general election: Dublin Central
Party	Candidate	FPv%	Count										
Party	Candidate	FPv%	1	2	3	4	5	6	7	8	9	10	11
Sinn Féin	Mary Lou McDonald	19.5	6,389	6,510	7,388								
Fine Gael	Paschal Donohoe	16.8	5,493	5,569	5,590	5,606	5,701	5,730	5,856	6,162	6,275	8,069	
Social Democrats	Gary Gannon	13.3	4,353	4,397	4,464	4,639	5,027	6,363	6,532	7,481			
Independent	Gerry Hutch	9.5	3,098	3,187	3,295	3,513	3,650	3,733	4,995	5,021	5,039	5,194	5,321
Labour	Marie Sherlock	7.5	2,465	2,505	2,521	2,547	2,665	2,917	2,990	3,841	4,557	5,070	6,102
Fianna Fáil	Mary Fitzpatrick	7.2	2,344	2,427	2,446	2,468	2,538	2,553	2,646	2,768	2,802		
Green	Neasa Hourigan	6.0	1,952	1,986	1,999	2,019	2,113	2,315	2,352				
Independent	Malachy Steenson	4.9	1,602	1,955	1,990	2,041	2,134	2,195					
PBP–Solidarity	Eoghan Ó Ceannabháin (Note: Ó Ceannabháin is a member of People Before Profit.)	4.5	1,471	1,497	1,540	1,656	2,112						
Inds. 4 Change	Clare Daly	4.0	1,317	1,367	1,445	1,539							
Sinn Féin	Janice Boylan	3.8	1,257	1,295									
Aontú	Ian Noel Smyth	2.2	715										
Centre Party	Andrew Kelly	0.9	298										
Electorate: 63,190 Valid: 32,754 Spoilt: 273 Quota: 6,551 Turnout: 33,027 (52.3%)

=== 2020 general election ===
2020 general election: Dublin Central
Party	Candidate	FPv%	Count								
Party	Candidate	FPv%	1	2	3	4	5	6	7	8	9
Sinn Féin	Mary Lou McDonald	35.7	11,223								
Fine Gael	Paschal Donohoe	13.3	4,181	4,282	4,290	4,292	4,687	4,738	5,110	5,147	6,126
Green	Neasa Hourigan	12.3	3,851	4,254	4,271	4,312	4,371	4,606	5,118	5,636	6,551
Fianna Fáil	Mary Fitzpatrick	10.3	3,228	3,503	3,530	3,535	3,570	3,723	3,967	4,010	
Social Democrats	Gary Gannon	9.3	2,912	3,605	3,638	3,696	3,724	3,912	4,357	5,028	5,718
Labour	Joe Costello	5.4	1,702	1,977	1,989	1,996	2,029	2,108			
Independent	Christy Burke	4.8	1,509	3,344	3,410	3,441	3,449	3,609	3,910	4,547	5,168
Solidarity–PBP	Gillian Brien (Note: Brien was a member of People Before Profit.)	2.5	776	1,590	1,624	1,825	1,836	2,128	2,233		
Aontú	Ian Noel Smyth	1.9	583	640	730	737	737				
Fine Gael	Deirdre Duffy	1.8	570	584	589	591					
Workers' Party	Éilis Ryan	1.4	429	593	617	656	662				
Solidarity–PBP	Rita Harrold (Note: Harrold was a member of Solidarity.)	0.6	201	403	418						
Independent	Sarah Louise Mulligan	0.4	124	153							
Independent	Dolores Webster	0.3	101	153							
Independent	Patrick Clohessy	0.1	33	47							
Independent	Sean O'Leary	0.0	12	19							
Electorate: 61,998 Valid: 31,435 Spoilt: 297 (0.9%) Quota: 6,288 Turnout: 31,732 (51.2%)

=== 2016 general election ===
2016 general election: Dublin Central
Party	Candidate	FPv%	Count										
Party	Candidate	FPv%	1	2	3	4	5	6	7	8	9	10	11
Sinn Féin	Mary Lou McDonald	24.4	5,770	5,780	5,806	5,825	5,854	6,016					
Fine Gael	Paschal Donohoe	13.6	3,226	3,228	3,231	3,276	3,393	3,405	3,480	4,478	4,481	5,127	5,447
Fianna Fáil	Mary Fitzpatrick	10.6	2,508	2,510	2,517	2,601	2,632	2,655	2,810	2,978	2,984		
Independent	Christy Burke	10.2	2,406	2,411	2,418	2,440	2,452	2,503	2,822	3,066	3,083	3,658	
Social Democrats	Gary Gannon	9.7	2,307	2,327	2,387	2,411	2,601	2,832	3,117	3,514	3,549	3,931	4,948
Labour	Joe Costello	8.8	2,092	2,102	2,121	2,132	2,245	2,281	2,345				
Independent	Maureen O'Sullivan	8.4	1,990	2,009	2,058	2,085	2,181	2,377	2,792	3,181	3,214	3,923	5,269
Independent	Cieran Perry	5.2	1,242	1,258	1,294	1,309	1,333	1,492					
AAA–PBP	Diana O'Dwyer	3.0	721	749	830	845	909						
Green	Ian Noel Smyth	2.7	644	651	674	696							
Renua	Jacqui Gilbourne	1.4	330	339	339								
Workers' Party	Éilis Ryan	1.3	303	316									
Direct Democracy	Cormac McKay	0.3	62										
Independent	Kerry Guinan	0.2	58										
Independent	William DJ Gorman	0.1	27										
Electorate: 45,747 Valid: 23,686 Spoilt: 304 (1.3%) Quota: 5,922 Turnout: 23,990 (52.4%)

=== 2011 general election ===
2011 general election: Dublin Central
Party	Candidate	FPv%	Count							
Party	Candidate	FPv%	1	2	3	4	5	6	7	8
Fine Gael	Paschal Donohoe	19.9	6,903	6,933						
Labour	Joe Costello	18.1	6,273	6,289	6,428	6,805	7,115			
Sinn Féin	Mary Lou McDonald	13.1	4,526	4,536	4,654	5,065	5,422	5,553	6,209	6,587
Independent	Maureen O'Sullivan	12.0	4,139	4,171	4,507	4,830	5,384	5,586	7,641	
Labour	Áine Clancy	10.2	3,514	3,532	3,796	3,853	3,978	4,135		
Fianna Fáil	Mary Fitzpatrick	10.1	3,504	3,514	3,606	3,628	3,716	4,821	5,403	5,743
Fianna Fáil	Cyprian Brady	4.7	1,637	1,639	1,675	1,725	1,753			
Independent	Cieran Perry	4.0	1,394	1,426	1,532	1,615				
Independent	Christy Burke	3.8	1,315	1,323	1,393					
Green	Phil Kearney	2.0	638	703						
Workers' Party	Malachy Steenson	0.8	274	285						
Christian Solidarity	Paul O'Loughlin	0.7	235	251						
Independent	John Hyland	0.2	77							
Independent	Thomas Hollywood	0.2	65							
Fís Nua	Liam Johnston (Note: Although Fís Nua was registered as a political party on 4 February 2011, the party's name did not appear on the ballot, as the Register of Political Parties in use is that in force on 1 February, when the writ for the general election was issued.)	0.1	48							
Independent	Benny Cooney	0.1	25							
Electorate: 56,892 Valid: 34,612 Spoilt: 457 (1.3%) Quota: 6,923 Turnout: 35,069 (61.6%)

=== 2009 by-election ===
Following the death of independent TD Tony Gregory, a by-election was held on 5 June 2009. It was won by Independent candidate Maureen O'Sullivan.

2009 by-election: Dublin Central
Party	Candidate	FPv%	Count							
Party	Candidate	FPv%	1	2	3	4	5	6	7	8
Independent	Maureen O'Sullivan	26.9	7,639	7,711	7,862	8,105	8,341	9,352	11,062	13,739
Fine Gael	Paschal Donohoe	22.7	6,439	6,461	6,488	6,578	6,737	7,412	7,880	10,198
Labour	Ivana Bacik	17.3	4,926	4,931	5,008	5,073	5,338	5,774	6,537	
Sinn Féin	Christy Burke	13.3	3,770	3,780	3,902	3,990	4,042	4,420		
Fianna Fáil	Maurice Ahern	12.3	3,483	3,512	3,526	3,564	3,621			
Green	David Geary	2.9	819	829	849	893				
Immigration Control	Patrick Talbot	2.2	614	636	676					
Workers' Party	Malachy Steenson	1.8	519	528						
Christian Solidarity	Paul O'Loughlin	0.7	203							
Electorate: 62,141 Valid: 28,412 Spoilt: 391 (1.4%) Quota: 14,207 Turnout: 28,803 (46.3%)

=== 2007 general election ===
2007 general election: Dublin Central
Party	Candidate	FPv%	Count							
Party	Candidate	FPv%	1	2	3	4	5	6	7	8
Fianna Fáil	Bertie Ahern	36.8	12,734							
Independent	Tony Gregory	13.4	4,649	5,453	5,622	6,062	6,799	7,385		
Labour	Joe Costello	12.6	4,353	4,793	4,870	5,028	5,809	6,073	6,205	8,018
Fine Gael	Paschal Donohoe	9.5	3,302	3,441	3,548	3,600	3,896	4,147	4,216	4,556
Sinn Féin	Mary Lou McDonald	9.2	3,182	3,471	3,519	3,744	3,948	4,120	4,178	
Green	Patricia McKenna	5.8	1,995	2,116	2,221	2,294				
Fianna Fáil	Mary Fitzpatrick	4.9	1,725	3,087	3,236	3,330	3,447			
Independent	Cieran Perry	2.7	952	1,058	1,133					
Fianna Fáil	Cyprian Brady	2.7	939	3,342	3,510	3,554	3,616	5,608	5,764	6,348
Christian Solidarity	Paul O'Loughlin	0.8	260	269						
Immigration Control	Patrick Talbot	0.7	239	253						
Progressive Democrats	Jerry Hannon	0.6	193	226						
Fathers Rights	Alan Beirne	0.3	116	202						
Electorate: 63,423 Valid: 34,639 Spoilt: 510 (1.5%) Quota: 6,928 Turnout: 35,149 (55.4%)

=== 2002 general election ===
2002 general election: Dublin Central
Party	Candidate	FPv%	Count						
Party	Candidate	FPv%	1	2	3	4	5	6	7
Fianna Fáil	Bertie Ahern	31.9	10,882						
Independent	Tony Gregory	16.6	5,664	6,477	6,625	7,242			
Sinn Féin	Nicky Kehoe	14.6	4,972	5,300	5,343	5,487	5,818	6,177	6,339
Labour	Joe Costello	12.2	4,136	4,499	4,539	5,046	7,870		
Fine Gael	Jim Mitchell	11.1	3,769	3,976	4,063	4,268			
Fianna Fáil	Dermot Fitzpatrick	7.6	2,590	4,855	4,968	5,043	5,560	6,264	6,418
Green	Tommy Simpson	4.3	1,469	1,545	1,652				
Christian Solidarity	Paul O'Loughlin	1.1	366	377					
Independent	Tom Prendeville	0.3	97	103					
Independent	Patrick O'Donnell	0.3	89	95					
Electorate: 62,180 Valid: 34,034 Spoilt: 483 (1.4%) Quota: 6,807 Turnout: 34,517 (55.5%)

=== 1997 general election ===
1997 general election: Dublin Central
Party	Candidate	FPv%	Count									
Party	Candidate	FPv%	1	2	3	4	5	6	7	8	9	10
Fianna Fáil	Bertie Ahern	34.1	12,175									
Independent	Tony Gregory	14.7	5,261	6,252	6,264	6,358	6,427	6,950	7,546			
Fine Gael	Jim Mitchell	14.5	5,185	5,391	5,401	5,459	5,512	5,658	5,863	5,943	6,391	6,650
Fianna Fáil	Marian McGennis	8.8	3,132	6,109	6,119	6,199	6,300	6,437	6,588	6,651	6,982	7,594
Labour	Joe Costello	8.5	3,035	3,262	3,268	3,301	3,325	3,447	3,747	3,930	4,250	5,343
Sinn Féin	Christy Burke	6.6	2,377	2,641	2,648	2,653	2,686	2,765	2,879	2,912	3,101	
Independent	Michael Conaghan	3.7	1,343	1,412	1,415	1,420	1,440	1,567	1,638	1,676		
Green	Ciarán Cuffe	3.5	1,253	1,367	1,379	1,422	1,479	1,559				
Independent	Vincent B. Jackson	1.8	650	702	714	718	755					
Workers' Party	Linda Kavanagh	1.4	509	537	544	552	558					
Independent	Eamonn Murphy	1.2	432	454	465	495						
Independent	Kevin Devlin	0.9	307	374	374							
Independent	Aidan Walsh	0.1	43	44								
Independent	Patrick John Shelley	0.1	39	47								
Electorate: 64,073 Valid: 35,741 Spoilt: 541 (1.5%) Quota: 7,149 Turnout: 36,282 (56.6%)

=== 1992 general election ===
1992 general election: Dublin Central
Party	Candidate	FPv%	Count									
Party	Candidate	FPv%	1	2	3	4	5	6	7	8	9	10
Fianna Fáil	Bertie Ahern	31.3	11,374									
Labour	Joe Costello	20.1	7,308									
Independent	Tony Gregory	16.0	5,809	6,528	6,595	6,734	6,969	7,073	7,667			
Fine Gael	Jim Mitchell	14.1	5,125	5,405	5,415	5,463	5,517	5,601	5,792	5,948	6,189	6,562
Fianna Fáil	Dermot Fitzpatrick	5.1	1,838	3,192	3,203	3,211	3,229	3,310	3,361	3,397	3,578	5,761
Sinn Féin	Christy Burke	3.7	1,362	1,456	1,476	1,515	1,546	1,564	1,626	1,706		
Fianna Fáil	Olga Bennett	3.0	1,087	2,578	2,584	2,616	2,636	2,689	2,798	2,854	3,083	
Green	Patricia McKenna	2.6	927	1,000	1,008	1,065	1,183	1,283				
Independent	Niamh Nic Mhathúna	1.4	514	532	535	547	552					
Democratic Left	Mike Jennings	1.3	467	494	509	537						
Workers' Party	Linda Kavanagh	1.0	368	381	468							
Workers' Party	Des Early	0.6	221	245								
Electorate: 60,391 Valid: 36,400 Spoilt: 733 (2.0%) Quota: 7,281 Turnout: 37,133 (61.5%)

=== 1989 general election ===
1989 general election: Dublin Central
Party	Candidate	FPv%	Count										
Party	Candidate	FPv%	1	2	3	4	5	6	7	8	9	10	11
Fianna Fáil	Bertie Ahern	32.9	13,589										
Independent	Tony Gregory	18.0	7,451										
Fine Gael	Pat Lee	12.8	5,296	5,602	5,657	5,664	5,669	5,765	6,792	7,230			
Fianna Fáil	John Stafford	6.1	2,530	4,742	4,805	4,807	4,834	4,893	4,979	5,151	5,192	5,386	5,734
Fianna Fáil	Dermot Fitzpatrick	5.9	2,420	5,621	5,651	5,654	5,705	5,777	5,847	6,073	6,120	6,255	6,518
Sinn Féin	Christy Burke	4.7	1,941	2,107	2,221	2,224	2,769	2,824	2,864	2,983	2,987	3,423	
Workers' Party	Mike Jennings	4.4	1,827	1,953	2,045	2,050	2,092	2,256	2,331	2,738	2,801		
Green	Enda Connolly	3.7	1,529	1,740	1,787	1,804	1,821	1,928	2,072				
Progressive Democrats	Geraldine Harney	3.4	1,418	1,570	1,605	1,608	1,616	1,695					
Labour	Joe Costello	3.2	1,305	1,420	1,481	1,483	1,502	2,257	2,380	2,741	2,863	4,166	5,247
Labour	Joan Burton	3.0	1,256	1,405	1,450	1,451	1,469						
Sinn Féin	Tony O'Flaherty	1.8	729	782	799	802							
Independent	Máire Máiréad Ni Dubgaill Ni Duinn	0.1	41	50	53								
Electorate: 65,971 Valid: 41,332 Spoilt: 467 (1.1%) Quota: 6,889 Turnout: 41,799 (63.4%)

=== 1987 general election ===
1987 general election: Dublin Central
Party	Candidate	FPv%	Count											
Party	Candidate	FPv%	1	2	3	4	5	6	7	8	9	10	11	12
Fianna Fáil	Bertie Ahern	28.7	13,635											
Independent	Tony Gregory	16.3	7,721	8,204										
Progressive Democrats	Michael Keating	13.4	6,361	6,571	6,621	6,639	6,722	6,919	7,126	7,438	8,122			
Fianna Fáil	John Stafford	8.4	3,966	5,703	5,796	5,800	5,818	5,862	5,878	6,083	6,542	6,578	6,625	7,473
Fine Gael	Pat Lee	5.6	2,643	2,701	2,712	2,716	2,741	2,817	3,285	3,422	3,617	3,703	6,194	6,484
Sinn Féin	Christy Burke	5.3	2,501	2,670	2,709	2,715	2,726	2,861	2,876	3,371	3,477	3,486	3,579	
Fianna Fáil	Dermot Fitzpatrick	5.0	2,392	5,109	5,155	5,159	5,168	5,215	5,240	5,401	5,857	5,886	5,983	6,562
Fine Gael	Luke Belton	4.3	2,034	2,100	2,104	2,110	2,121	2,174	2,740	2,813	2,990	3,042		
Independent	Alice Glenn	4.1	1,951	2,099	2,111	2,119	2,136	2,207	2,238	2,366				
Workers' Party	Michael Jennings	3.1	1,463	1,507	1,528	1,545	1,593	2,022	2,041					
Fine Gael	Shane Byrne	2.7	1,296	1,321	1,325	1,326	1,344	1,384						
Labour	Joe Costello	1.6	767	812	819	825	1,236							
Labour	Mary Freehill	1.3	632	653	658	673								
Independent	Barbara Hyland	0.2	94	96	98									
Electorate: 74,679 Valid: 47,456 Quota: 7,910 Turnout: 63.5%

=== 1983 by-election ===
Fianna Fáil TD George Colley died on 17 September 1983. The by-election was held on 23 November 1983 and was won by Fianna Fáil candidate Tom Leonard.

1983 by-election: Dublin Central
Party	Candidate	FPv%	Count							
Party	Candidate	FPv%	1	2	3	4	5	6	7	8
Fianna Fáil	Tom Leonard	46.6	15,236	15,240	15,273	15,289	15,343	15,449	15,795	16,439
Fine Gael	Mary Banotti	22.5	7,362	7,373	7,400	7,411	7,504	7,668	8,446	8,623
Workers' Party	Michael White	13.3	4,342	4,358	4,373	4,472	4,594	4,743	5,274	6,284
Sinn Féin	Christy Burke	7.1	2,304	2,307	2,313	2,373	2,407	2,444	2,566	
Labour	Jimmy Somers	6.0	1,966	1,970	1,977	1,997	2,044	2,122		
Independent	Leo Armstrong	1.8	574	580	602	608	700			
Independent	Anthony Ryan	1.4	458	468	487	503				
Communist	Edward Glackin	0.7	243	244	247					
Independent	William Foley	0.5	147	153						
Independent	Jim Tallon	0.2	72							
Electorate: 70,403 Valid: 32,704 Quota: 16,353 Turnout: 46.5%

=== November 1982 general election ===
November 1982 general election: Dublin Central
Party	Candidate	FPv%	Count						
Party	Candidate	FPv%	1	2	3	4	5	6	7
Fianna Fáil	Bertie Ahern	23.7	10,542						
Fine Gael	Michael Keating	17.9	7,945						
Independent	Tony Gregory (Note: Appeared on the ballot as Tony Gregory-Independent.)	14.0	6,237	6,431	6,465	6,471	7,462		
Fianna Fáil	George Colley	12.6	5,622	7,495					
Fine Gael	Alice Glenn	8.4	3,723	3,788	4,060	4,062	4,153	6,591	7,104
Labour	Jimmy Somers	7.5	3,337	3,381	3,405	3,406	4,189	4,417	4,763
Fine Gael	John Colgan	5.7	2,513	2,612	2,802	2,803	2,868		
Fianna Fáil	Tom Leonard	5.4	2,396	3,220	3,226	3,298	3,439	3,532	
Workers' Party	Michael White	4.9	2,161	2,191	2,197	2,197			
Electorate: 75,644 Valid: 44,476 Quota: 7,413 Turnout: 58.8%

=== February 1982 general election ===
February 1982 general election: Dublin Central
Party	Candidate	FPv%	Count									
Party	Candidate	FPv%	1	2	3	4	5	6	7	8	9	10
Fianna Fáil	Bertie Ahern	18.7	8,570									
Fine Gael	Michael Keating	17.5	8,000									
Fianna Fáil	George Colley	16.5	7,542	8,174								
Labour	Michael O'Leary	11.0	5,042	5,063	5,137	5,151	5,183	5,210	5,320	5,715	6,012	6,511
Independent	Tony Gregory (Note: Appeared on the ballot as Tony Gregory-Community.)	10.3	4,703	4,730	4,752	4,768	4,815	4,861	5,414	6,458	6,555	7,737
Fine Gael	Alice Glenn	6.5	2,971	2,991	3,164	3,168	3,180	3,193	3,239	3,337	5,061	5,412
Fianna Fáil	Tom Leonard	6.5	2,990	3,131	3,137	3,551	3,558	4,113	4,276	4,485	4,525	
Fine Gael	Luke Belton	4.4	2,023	2,046	2,138	2,140	2,147	2,162	2,187	2,246		
Sinn Féin The Workers' Party	Michael White	3.7	1,672	1,678	1,681	1,684	1,710	1,740	2,084			
Sinn Féin	Christy Burke	3.2	1,458	1,472	1,475	1,479	1,485	1,505				
Fianna Fáil	Michael Ward	1.3	611	670	672	764	776					
Independent	Leo Martin	0.4	160	163	164	165						
Electorate: 74,713 Valid: 45,742 Spoilt: 438 (0.9%) Quota: 7,624 Turnout: 46,180 (61.8%)

=== 1981 general election ===
1981 general election: Dublin Central
Party	Candidate	FPv%	Count									
Party	Candidate	FPv%	1	2	3	4	5	6	7	8	9	10
Fianna Fáil	Bertie Ahern	18.8	8,738									
Fine Gael	Michael Keating	17.7	8,250									
Fianna Fáil	George Colley	17.2	8,011									
Labour	Michael O'Leary	10.2	4,737	4,785	4,871	4,886	5,624	6,164	8,049			
Fianna Fáil	Tom Leonard	7.0	3,271	4,042	4,052	4,268	4,348	4,500	4,674	4,709	4,798	5,856
Independent	Tony Gregory (Note: Appeared on the ballot as Tony Gregory-Community.)	6.8	3,151	3,199	3,219	3,228	3,286	3,859	4,120	4,220	4,407	
Fine Gael	Luke Belton	5.6	2,621	2,661	2,817	2,821	2,843	2,901	3,001	3,048		
Fine Gael	Alice Glenn	5.5	2,538	2,572	2,770	2,774	2,824	2,894	3,105	3,217	5,710	7,162
Labour	Patrick Carroll	4.4	2,062	2,083	2,095	2,098	2,415	2,770				
Sinn Féin The Workers' Party	Michael White	3.9	1,803	1,815	1,822	1,825	1,891					
Labour	Jimmy Somers	2.9	1,347	1,356	1,362	1,364						
Electorate: 74,713 Valid: 46,529 Quota: 7,755 Turnout: 62.3%

=== 1973 general election ===
1973 general election: Dublin Central
Party	Candidate	FPv%	Count								
Party	Candidate	FPv%	1	2	3	4	5	6	7	8	9
Fianna Fáil	Vivion de Valera	21.3	6,491								
Fine Gael	Maurice E. Dockrell	14.2	4,308	4,317	4,325	4,412	4,973	5,091	5,234	6,017	6,123
Labour	Frank Cluskey	12.7	3,864	3,870	3,977	4,176	4,373	5,461	7,575		
Fianna Fáil	Thomas J. Fitzpatrick	12.5	3,807	4,097	4,111	4,224	4,282	4,336	4,366	4,402	7,269
Fianna Fáil	Tom Leonard	10.6	3,221	3,291	3,311	3,369	3,426	3,483	3,504	3,540	
Fine Gael	Alexis FitzGerald	7.2	2,198	2,216	2,223	2,298	3,105	3,237	3,373	3,792	3,992
Fine Gael	Michael Keating	5.9	1,796	1,799	1,809	1,849					
Labour	Griff Cashman	5.8	1,763	1,764	1,852	2,055	2,119	2,542			
Labour	James Mooney	5.4	1,644	1,647	1,751	1,854	1,942				
Independent	Gerard Brady	2.9	876	879	960						
Independent	Michael O'Riordan	1.5	466	467							
Electorate: 46,775 Valid: 30,434 Quota: 6,087 Turnout: 65.1%

=== 1969 general election ===
1969 general election: Dublin Central
Party	Candidate	FPv%	Count											
Party	Candidate	FPv%	1	2	3	4	5	6	7	8	9	10	11	12
Fianna Fáil	Vivion de Valera	22.9	7,493											
Labour	Frank Cluskey	16.5	5,413	5,427	5,479	5,500	5,885	5,929	6,200	7,509				
Fine Gael	Maurice E. Dockrell	13.3	4,364	4,384	4,387	4,611	4,636	5,168	5,305	5,372	5,420	6,947		
Fianna Fáil	Tom Fitzpatrick	8.0	2,619	3,281	3,287	3,299	3,316	3,351	3,511	3,537	3,543	3,608	4,078	6,149
Fianna Fáil	Tom Leonard	6.5	2,142	2,310	2,319	2,338	2,359	2,405	2,699	2,725	2,736	2,806	3,028	
Labour	Jim Mooney	5.2	1,714	1,720	1,767	1,782	2,038	2,054	2,181	2,481	3,333	3,437	3,996	4,179
Independent	Gerard Brady	5.2	1,707	1,725	1,743	1,761	1,792	1,833	2,106	2,163	2,188	2,317		
Labour	Griff Cashman	4.8	1,574	1,578	1,615	1,621	1,763	1,789	1,872					
Independent	Frank Sherwin	4.4	1,456	1,477	1,494	1,504	1,531	1,606						
Fine Gael	Willie Naughton	4.3	1,404	1,410	1,418	1,617	1,628	2,028	2,140	2,159	2,168			
Fine Gael	John Nealon	3.5	1,151	1,154	1,162	1,238	1,246							
Labour	Jim Downey	2.7	895	903	931	939								
Fine Gael	Peter Keating	1.9	612	616	617									
Irish Worker League	Sam Nolan	0.7	242	243										
Electorate: 48,761 Valid: 32,786 Quota: 6,558 Turnout: 67.2%

== See also ==
- Elections in the Republic of Ireland
- Politics of the Republic of Ireland
- List of Dáil by-elections
- List of political parties in the Republic of Ireland
