= 2009 Dublin Central by-election =

By-election to the 30th Dáil

- 5 June 2009
- Turnout: 28,803 (46.3%)
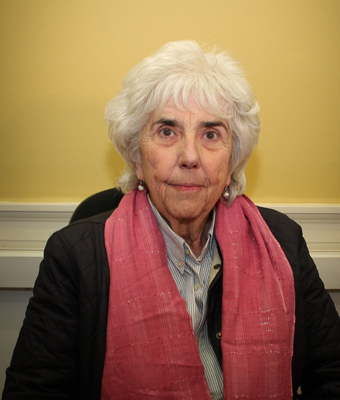

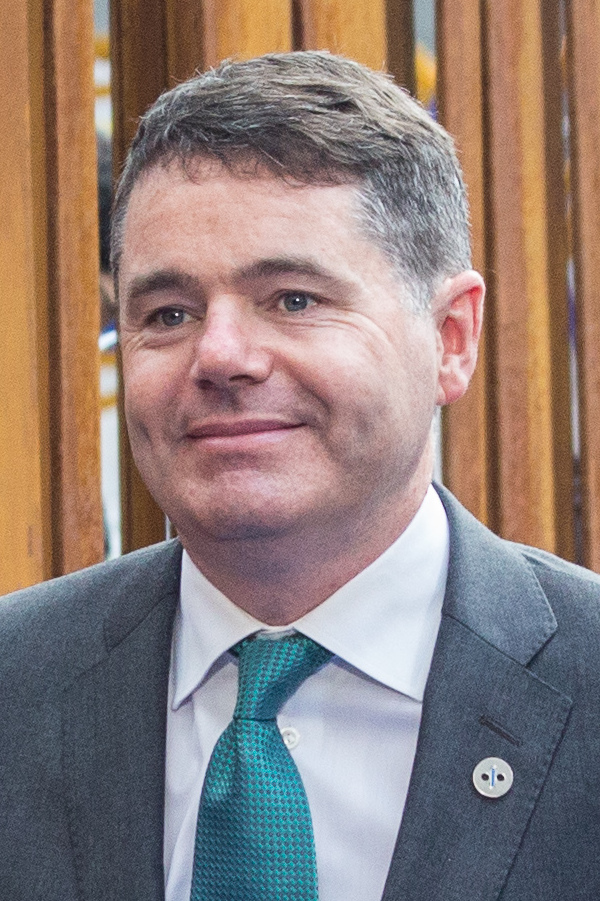

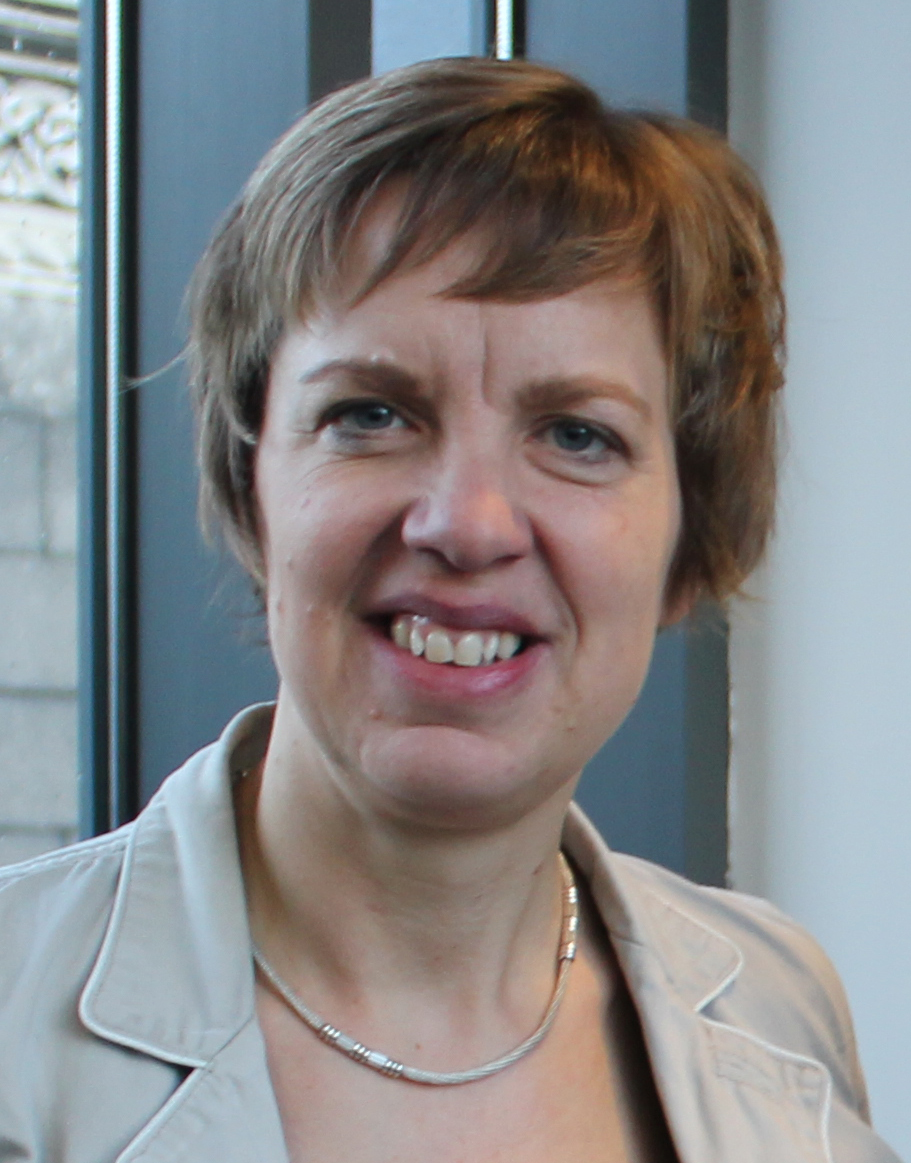
Nominee	Maureen O'Sullivan	Paschal Donohoe	Ivana Bacik
Party	Independent	Fine Gael	Labour
First preferences	7,639	6,439	4,926
Percentage	26.9%	22.7%	17.3%
Final count	13,739	10,198	–
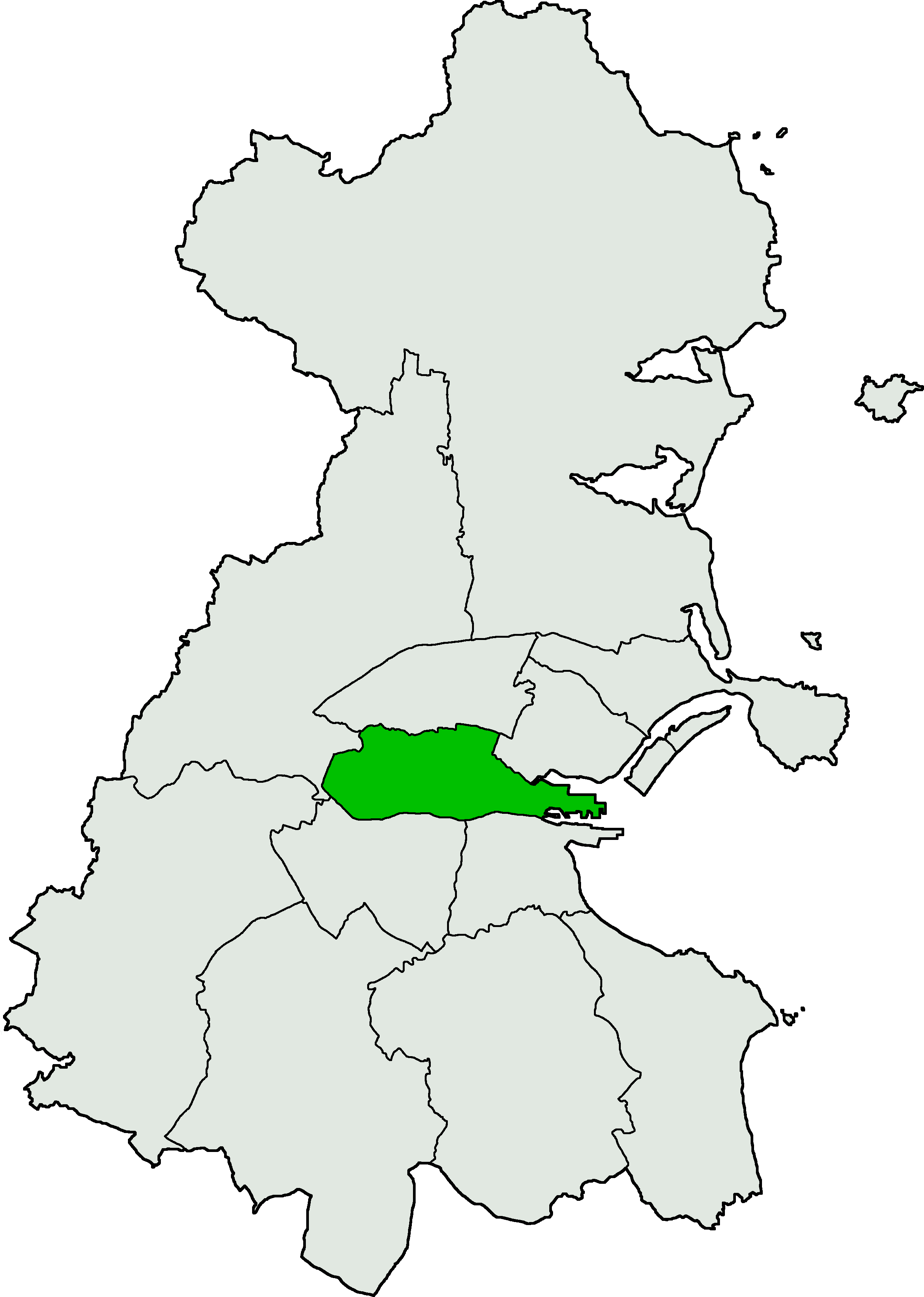
- Dublin Central shown within County Dublin
TD before election
Tony Gregory
Independent
TD after election
Maureen O'Sullivan
Independent

A Dáil by-election was held in the constituency of Dublin Central in Ireland on Friday, 5 June 2009, to fill a vacancy in the 30th Dáil. It followed the death of the independent Teachta Dála (TD) Tony Gregory on 2 January 2009.

The by-election was held on the same day as the 2009 European and local elections. A by-election was held in the Dublin South constituency on the same date.

The independent candidate Maureen O'Sullivan, Gregory's former election agent, was elected on the eighth count.

== Background ==
Independent TD Tony Gregory, who had been a TD for Dublin Central since 1982, died on 2 January 2009, aged 61 after a long battle with cancer. Under Irish law, this forced a by-election to be held in the constituency. The government had previously suggested this by-election and one in Dublin South would be held on 5 June 2009, the same day as the European and local elections, but speculation began to arise that the Dublin Central election would be postponed. However, on 29 April, the government confirmed that the two by-elections would be held on 5 June.

=== Constituency profile ===
At the time of the election, Dublin Central was considered a mixed constituency, with large pockets of deprived areas but also many middle class areas. The constituency had a high immigrant population with 27% being non-Irish, and a large number of young professionals.

== Candidate selection ==
Gregory was reported to have asked Socialist Party TD Joe Higgins to run in the by-election to succeed him, but Higgins declined as he had already agreed to stand for the Socialist Party in the concurrent European elections.

=== Fine Gael ===
Fine Gael's candidate at this election was Senator Paschal Donohoe. Donohoe had contested Dublin Central at the last general election, being eliminated on the final count.

=== Fianna Fáil ===
Dublin Central was the home constituency of former Taoiseach, Bertie Ahern, who had resigned in 2008. Ahern's brother, Dublin City councillor Maurice and fellow city councillors Tom Stafford and Mary Fitzpatrick sought the Fianna Fáil nomination for this by-election. Stafford withdrew his candidacy on the night of the selection convention, and after a 64–17 vote Maurice Ahern was selected as the Fianna Fáil candidate.

=== Gregory group ===
While not a party officially, Tony Gregory's political machine had long elected candidates in Dublin city. Dublin City Councillor Maureen O'Sullivan, formerly Gregory's election agent, was backed by Gregory's allies to run in this election.

=== Labour Party ===
Senator Ivana Bacik, the sole candidate to seek the nomination, was chosen as the Labour Party candidate for this election on 5 May. Incumbent TD for the constituency Joe Costello was her director of elections for this election. Bacik had been accused of being "parachuted" into the constituency as she did not live there.

=== Sinn Féin ===
There had been some early speculation that newly elected Sinn Féin leader and incumbent MEP for Dublin Mary Lou McDonald would contest this by-election, but the entry of Dublin City Councillor Christy Burke into the race effectively ended her chance of running. On 11 May, Burke was confirmed as the Sinn Féin candidate at this election.

=== Other parties ===
The Green Party nominated solicitor David Geary, also running in the concurrent city council election, as their candidate at this election.

Other candidates included Malachy Steenson of the Workers' Party, Paul O'Loughlin of the Christian Solidarity Party and Patrick Talbot of Immigration Control Platform.

== Campaign ==
The election was expected to be something of a referendum on the popularity of the incumbent Fianna Fáil-Green Party coalition government under Taoiseach Brian Cowen, with some senior Fianna Fáil figures reporting a "dreadful" reaction on the doors. With Dublin Central being the constituency of former Taoiseach Bertie Ahern, who had resigned under a cloud following revelations of payments received from property developers in the Mahon Tribunal, this was expected to be heightened even further, particularly given Ahern's brother's candidacy.

Green Party candidate David Geary was noted to have run on a platform of ridding the city of dog poo, placing 1,000 brown "pooper scooper" bags for free inside shops.

== Predictions and polls ==
The election was expected to be close; writing for the Irish Times two days prior to polling, Harry McGee opined that it was "between Donohoe, O'Sullivan and Bacik", unable to call a winner. Andrew Lynch of the Evening Herald described the election as a "group of death".

Odds on 10 May had Maureen O'Sullivan and Ivana Bacik joint favourites at 6/4 to take the seat, followed by Paschal Donohoe at 13/8, Maurice Ahern at 6/1 and the yet unconfirmed Sinn Féin candidate at 10/1. By 3 June, Donohoe was an odds-on favourite at 4/5, followed by O'Sullivan at 7/4 and Bacik at 3/1.

Last date of polling	Polling firm / Commissioner	Sample size	Donohoe (FG)	Bacik (Lab)	O'Sullivan (Ind)	Ahern (FF)	Burke (SF)	Geary (GP)	Steenson (WP)	Talbot (ICP)	O'Loughlin (CSP)	O/I
8 May 2009	Sunday Independent/Quantum Research	300	28%	20%	18%	10%	3% (Note: Candidate not selected at time of polling.)	2%	1%			18% (Note: 18% "don't know".)

== Result ==
Following the redistribution of Ivana Bacik's votes, Maureen O'Sullivan was deemed elected on the eighth count.

2009 Dublin Central by-election
Party	Candidate	FPv%	Count							
Party	Candidate	FPv%	1	2	3	4	5	6	7	8
Independent	Maureen O'Sullivan	26.9	7,639	7,711	7,862	8,105	8,341	9,352	11,062	13,739
Fine Gael	Paschal Donohoe	22.7	6,439	6,461	6,488	6,578	6,737	7,412	7,880	10,198
Labour	Ivana Bacik	17.3	4,926	4,931	5,008	5,073	5,338	5,774	6,537	
Sinn Féin	Christy Burke	13.3	3,770	3,780	3,902	3,990	4,042	4,420		
Fianna Fáil	Maurice Ahern	12.3	3,483	3,512	3,526	3,564	3,621			
Green	David Geary	2.9	819	829	849	893				
Immigration Control	Patrick Talbot	2.2	614	636	676					
Workers' Party	Malachy Steenson	1.8	519	528						
Christian Solidarity	Paul O'Loughlin	0.7	203							
Electorate: 62,141 Valid: 28,412 Spoilt: 391 (1.4%) Quota: 14,207 Turnout: 28,803 (46.3%)

=== Reactions ===
Following her victory, O'Sullivan said she did not expect such a resounding victory, but said "obviously we are delighted as a group". Fine Gael leader Enda Kenny, whose party placed second in the election, hailed the results of this by-election and the other concurrent elections as a sign that the people of Ireland wanted a new government, vowing to place a no-confidence motion in them.

The election saw Maurice Ahern not only fail to win the seat but lose his seat on Dublin City Council, with some media sources claiming this was a sign of the end of the Ahern family's political machine. Some opined that the aggressive promotion of Ahern by Fianna Fáil caused a disappointing result for the party, with Richard Bruton suggesting that he did not "get the full Fianna Fáil vote".

Five days after the election, Sinn Féin's candidate Christy Burke quit the party to become an independent politician, accusing the party of not sufficiently supporting him during his run.

== See also ==
- 2009 Dublin South by-election
