= Tony Gregory =

Irish politician (1947–2009)

- Gregory in 1982

Teachta Dála
- In office February 1982 – 2 January 2009
- Constituency: Dublin Central

Dublin City Councillor
- In office June 1979 – June 2004
- Constituency: North Inner City

Personal details
- Born: 5 December 1947 Dublin, Ireland
- Died: 2 January 2009 (aged 61) Dublin, Ireland
- Party: Independent
- Other political affiliations: Socialist Labour Party (1977–1979); IRSP (1974–1977); Official Sinn Féin (1970–1972); Sinn Féin (1964–1970)
- Education: University College Dublin
- Profession: Teacher

Tony Gregory (Note: Appeared on the ballot as Tony Gregory-Community from 1979 to 1981 and as Tony Gregory-Independent in November 1982. He had changed his name by deed poll because non-party candidates are not allowed to use the word "independent" as a party label on the ballot paper.) (5 December 1947 – 2 January 2009) was an Irish independent politician and Teachta Dála (TD) for the Dublin Central constituency from 1982 until his death in 2009, a span of almost twenty-seven years that made him the longest-serving independent TD in the history of the state. A former member of Sinn Féin, the IRA and the Irish Republican Socialist Party, Gregory built his political career on community activism in Dublin's north inner city, an area marked by poverty, poor housing and, from the early 1980s, heroin addiction.

On his election to Dáil Éireann in February 1982, Gregory found himself holding the balance of power in a hung Dáil and negotiated a package of investment for his constituency, estimated at the time to be worth around £100 million, in return for supporting Fianna Fáil leader Charles Haughey as Taoiseach. The agreement became known as the "Gregory Deal", although Gregory himself preferred to call it a "programme for government". Much of the deal went unfulfilled after Haughey's government collapsed within the year, but the episode established Gregory as a national figure and helped secure his re-election at every subsequent general election until his death.

Beyond the deal, Gregory was known for campaigning on behalf of Dublin's female street traders, for which he was jailed for two weeks in 1986, and for his prominent role in the community response to Dublin's heroin epidemic during the 1980s and 1990s, including his support for the Concerned Parents Against Drugs movement. He was the first TD to refuse to wear a tie in the Dáil chamber, a small act of defiance that drew considerable public attention at the time. He never held ministerial or government office, but was widely described, in the words of Dublin City Council historian in residence Mary Muldowney, as a "true working class hero".

Gregory died on 2 January 2009 in St Francis Hospice, Raheny, after a battle of over a year with stomach cancer. He never married, though he was in a long-term relationship with Annette Dolan at the time of his death. His long-time election agent, Maureen O'Sullivan, succeeded him at the resulting by-election.

== Early life ==
Gregory was born in Ballybough on Dublin's Northside on 5 December 1947, the second child of Anthony Gregory and Ellen Gregory (née Judge). His father, a native of the North Strand area of Dublin, had run a small shoemaker's business in Ballybough before, unable to make a living from it, becoming a warehouseman on Dublin docks, where he experienced regular periods of unemployment. His mother, born in 1904 in Croghan, County Offaly, was the daughter of small farmers and had moved to Dublin to work as a waitress after the mid-1920s. The couple married in 1944 and lived in a one-room flat in Ballybough, on Charleville Street, into the 1950s.

The family applied to be housed by Dublin Corporation but were refused, with an official reportedly telling his mother to "come back when you have six [children]". The incident left a lasting impression on Gregory, who referred to it in interviews throughout his life, and he dated much of his political motivation to his parents' experience of housing insecurity. Having saved £700 between them, his parents were eventually able to buy a house at Sackville Gardens, near the Royal Canal, where Gregory lived for the rest of his life.

Gregory later reflected that this background, combined with growing up in the centre of Dublin, had given him "a very acute sense of the social inequality that exists in this country", and said the experience had left him with a bitterness he felt he never entirely lost. He was especially close to his mother and was deeply affected by her death in 1969, at times saying in later life that he still prayed to her memory. He also spent childhood holidays at his mother's family home near Croghan Hill in Offaly, and retained a lifelong fondness for the countryside. His mother was a devout Catholic, and Gregory served as an altar boy and was a member of the Legion of Mary as a teenager, though he described himself in later interviews as having little faith left, saying he had "an excess of religion" in the first twenty years of his life.

Gregory attended a pre-school run by the Loreto sisters on Hill Street, then a school on North William Street run by the Sisters of Charity, before completing his primary education at St Canice's Christian Brothers School on the North Circular Road. At his mother's prompting, he sat a Dublin Corporation scholarship examination for a place in secondary school, recalling later that his primary teachers offered him little encouragement, on the assumption that local children who progressed to second level would attend a technical school rather than a grammar school. He won the scholarship and enrolled at the Christian Brothers' O'Connell School on North Richmond Street in September 1960, one of very few children from his immediate area to do so at that time.

After completing his Leaving Certificate in 1966, Gregory secured a place on a Bachelor of Arts course studying Irish and history at University College Dublin (UCD), working a summer at the Wall's ice cream factory in Acton, London to help pay his way. He later recalled feeling out of step with most of his fellow students, saying he "took no part in college social life" and often cycled home for lunch rather than socialise, in part for want of money. It was nonetheless at UCD that he became politically active, helping to found a Republican Club there despite opposition from the college authorities, and becoming involved with the Dublin Housing Action Committee.

After graduating with his BA in 1969, Gregory completed a Higher Diploma in Education and qualified as a secondary school teacher in 1970. He taught for a period at a vocational school on Great Denmark Street during his diploma year, before working at Coláiste Mhuire on Parnell Square and then Synge Street CBS. From the early 1970s until his election to the Dáil in 1982, he taught history and French through Irish at Coláiste Eoin, a secondary school in Stillorgan, where his students included John Crown, Colm Mac Eochaidh, Aengus Ó Snodaigh and musician Liam Ó Maonlaí. Former pupils praised his ability to make history vivid, noting his preference for academic texts, such as F. S. L. Lyons's Ireland since the Famine, over standard classroom textbooks.

== Political career ==
=== Sinn Féin, the IRA and the IRSP ===
Gregory became involved in republican politics during the 1960s, joining Sinn Féin and the IRA. By his own later account, he had called to the Sinn Féin offices at Gardiner Place around the time of the fiftieth anniversary of the 1916 Easter Rising, seeking to join the IRA, and was formally recruited into Official Sinn Féin only after he graduated from UCD in 1969. In UCD he helped found the UCD Republican Club, which claimed some sixty-four members by November 1968, and became involved with the Dublin Housing Action Committee. Within the movement he was a strong supporter of Wicklow republican Seamus Costello, later describing Costello as the politician he most admired in his lifetime. Costello, a member of Wicklow County Council, emphasised involvement in local politics and opposed abstentionism. Gregory sided with the Officials in the 1970 split within Sinn Féin, remaining a member of Official Sinn Féin and the Official IRA until 1973, and serving on the party's education committee in Dublin as well as education officer for his IRA unit.

Despite having a promising future within the party, Gregory resigned in 1972, citing frustration with ideological infighting. (Note: Some accounts place his departure from Official Sinn Féin closer to 1973.) He later stated that "everything they had espoused when I joined they were busily in the process of getting rid of". When his mentor Costello was expelled from the Officials and went on to found the Irish Republican Socialist Party (IRSP) in 1974, Gregory supported him and was briefly involved with the new organisation, though he later said in a Hot Press interview, published after his death, that he had "agreed to join on paper, but had never got involved with the political organisation itself". Costello's assassination in 1977, at the hands of the Official IRA, had a deep effect on Gregory, who later said Costello had been "the greatest loss that the left has ever suffered in this country since Connolly and the others were killed". Gregory left the IRSP after Costello's death, and remained deeply suspicious of the Officials in their later incarnation as the Workers' Party (WP). He was briefly a member of the Socialist Labour Party (SLP), founded in 1977 by Noel Browne and Matt Merrigan, but grew disillusioned with factional squabbling within the party and turned instead to local community politics.

=== Community activism and Dublin Corporation ===
From 1974, Gregory helped set up the Sackville Gardens Residents' Association. He was involved in establishing a holiday centre for inner-city youth in Cavan. This initiative later became the Cavan Centre. Through this community work, he came into close and lasting contact with fellow activists Fergus McCabe and Mick Rafferty, who, along with Gregory's elder brother Noel, would remain his closest political allies for the next three decades. Gregory, McCabe and Rafferty were among the key figures behind the North Central Community Council (NCCC), which coordinated local tenants' and community groups. In May 1979, Gregory, then secretary of the NCCC, was arrested along with several colleagues during a sit-down protest on Gardiner Street against redevelopment plans for the area.

Gregory was elected to Dublin Corporation at the 1979 Dublin Corporation election as a "Dublin Community Independent" candidate, polling 1,727 first-preference votes. He remained a councillor until 2004. A profile of him published shortly after his election in the magazine Hibernia described him as "fiercely ambitious" and tipped him as a likely future contender for a Dáil seat. During 1980, Gregory criticised establishment politicians for their failure to address poverty and inequality in inner Dublin, while also chiding the left for being, in his view, more concerned with ideology than with concrete reform.

=== Independent TD ===
Gregory first stood for the Dáil as an independent candidate in Dublin Central at the June 1981 general election. Though not elected, he polled 3,151 votes (6.8%), finishing seventh in a five-seat constituency, a result that surprised political commentators and gave him the profile needed to build support beyond his core inner-city base. At the February 1982 general election he was elected to Dáil Éireann as an Independent TD, polling 4,703 votes (10.3%), taking a seat from Fine Gael's Alice Glenn and finishing ahead of Labour Party leader Michael O'Leary. He retained his seat at every general election thereafter until he died in 2009.

==== The Gregory Deal ====
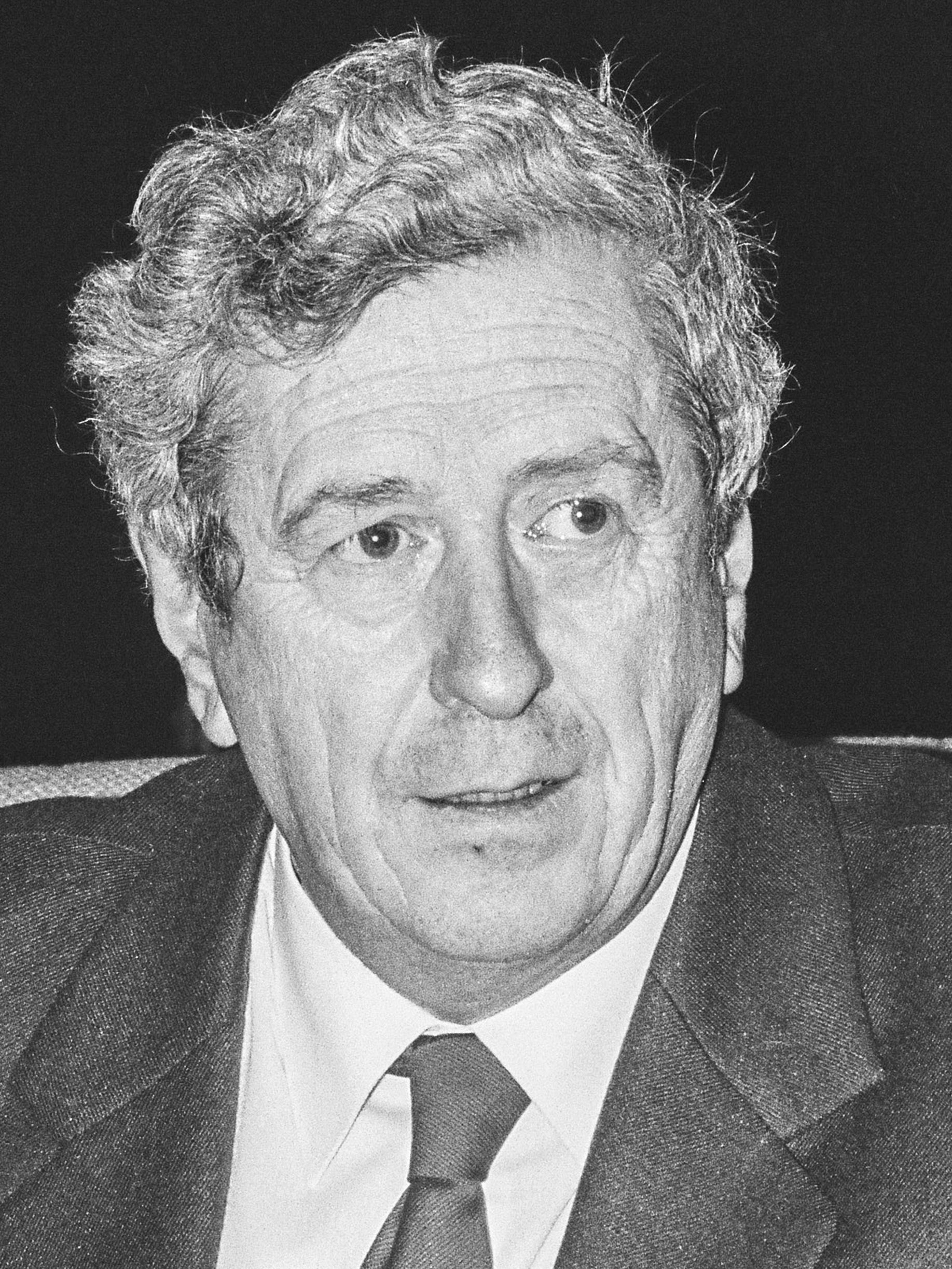
Garret FitzGerald

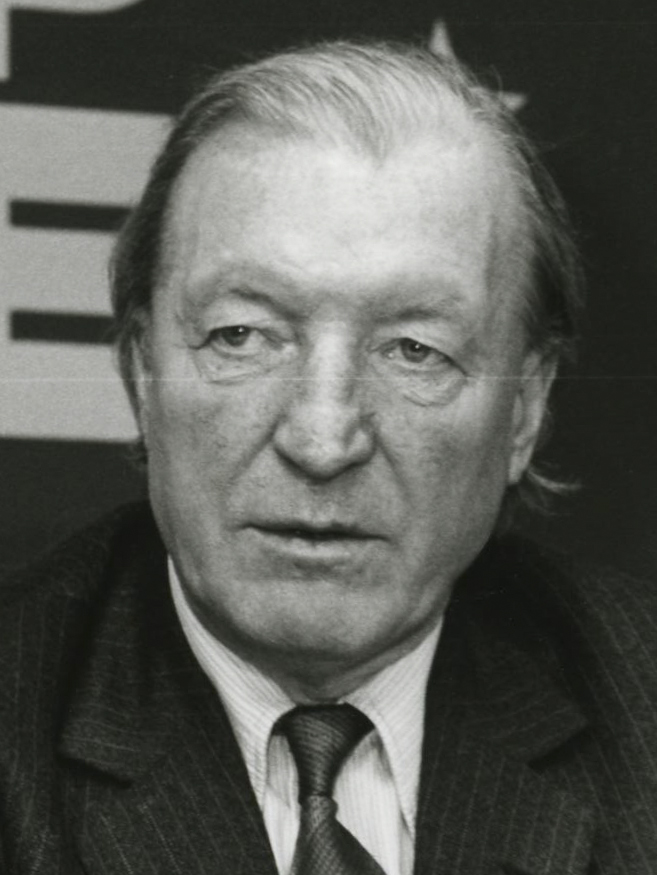
Charles Haughey

The leaders of Ireland's main political parties attempted to court Gregory in 1982 in order to win a majority in the Dáil

The February 1982 election produced a hung Dáil in which no party held a majority, leaving Gregory and a small number of other independents in a position of considerable leverage. Gregory initially favoured an alliance of left-leaning deputies, and in early March he and Limerick TD Jim Kemmy proposed forming a bloc with the three TDs of Sinn Féin the Workers' Party (SFWP); in Gregory's later account, SFWP were not seriously interested, while Kemmy was determined to support Fine Gael's Garret FitzGerald regardless.

Both Haughey and FitzGerald sought meetings with Gregory, who insisted that any negotiations take place on his own ground rather than at Haughey's home in Kinsealy; talks were instead held at the north-inner-city Community Action Project's office at 20 Summerhill Parade. Gregory's negotiating team consisted of himself, community workers Mick Rafferty and Fergus McCabe, and his brother Noel Gregory. The team presented Haughey with a two-page document outlining the issues on which Gregory had campaigned, including education, employment and social welfare; Haughey returned repeatedly with expanded written proposals, at one stage remarking, of the list put to him, "you're pushing an open door". Michael Mullen, general secretary of the Irish Transport and General Workers' Union (ITGWU), whom the team had encountered by chance during the negotiations, agreed to witness the final agreement, which the team regarded as an important safeguard against a broken promise. Garret FitzGerald, by contrast, did not meet Gregory until a week before the Dáil vote for Taoiseach, and the Fine Gael leader's team was, in the assessment of Gregory's negotiators, slower to grasp the detail of what was being sought.

Gregory ultimately struck his agreement with Haughey, sealing it with a handshake; Haughey is reported to have remarked, "as the Mafia say, it is a pleasure to do business with you". The agreement, immediately dubbed the "Gregory Deal" by the media, though Gregory maintained its proper title was a "programme for government", committed the incoming Fianna Fáil government to a wide range of measures. The written agreement included commitments to nationalise a 27-acre (110,000 m^{2}) site in Dublin Port and the Clondalkin Paper Mills. A total of £4 million was to be allocated to employ 500 extra people in the inner city, while 3,746 jobs were to be created over three years. State funding would be provided to build 440 new houses in the constituency and another 1,600 in the rest of Dublin, and further commitments covered health, welfare reform and the closure of the Curragh Camp military detention camp. The whole deal was worth an estimated £100 million at the time, dwarfing a rival, forty-nine-page package of promises separately offered by FitzGerald.

Writing in Magill the following month, journalist Pat Brennan cautioned that the agreement was "a last minute deal, not a plan that was studied, costed, discussed, and finalised", and observed that it remained unclear who would ultimately pay for it or whether it represented a genuine transfer of resources to the poor rather than simply additional state borrowing. Although Gregory was reviled in certain quarters for effectively holding a government to ransom, his uncompromising commitment to the poor was widely admired. Fianna Fáil lost office at the November 1982 general election, and much of what had been promised in the Gregory Deal was never implemented by the incoming Fine Gael-Labour coalition; a planned community school for Sean McDermott Street, for instance, was not built for a decade. Gregory retained his seat in the November election, his first-preference vote rising to 6,237 (14%).

Gregory found himself holding the balance of power for a second time after the 1987 Irish general election. On this occasion, Haughey made clear there would be no repeat visit to Summerhill Parade, with a Fianna Fáil spokesman remarking that "the day of the great stroke is over". Gregory kept the Dáil guessing on his voting intentions until shortly before the vote, ultimately abstaining; Haughey was elected Taoiseach on the casting vote of the Ceann Comhairle, Seán Treacy. Gregory dismissed the outcome to taunts from the outgoing government as "the lesser of two evils".

==== Anti-drugs campaigning ====
Gregory was heavily involved throughout the 1980s and 1990s in tackling Dublin's growing heroin problem. Heroin had largely been introduced to Dublin's north inner city by the Dunne criminal group, based in Crumlin, in the late 1970s. In 1982 a report revealed that 10% of 15 to 24-year-olds in the north inner city had used heroin at least once. The spread of heroin also drove a sharp rise in petty crime. Gregory confronted both the government and senior gardaí over what he regarded as an inadequate response, and he co-ordinated with the Concerned Parents Against Drugs (CPAD) movement from 1983, defending it against accusations by government ministers Michael Noonan and Barry Desmond that it was a front for the Provisional IRA. According to a later account by historian Brian Hanley reviewing André Lyder's memoir of the movement, Gregory and Sinn Féin councillor Christy Burke were, initially, the only local political figures in the north inner city to give the campaign their support, largely because both men lived in the areas worst affected and shared the same concerns as their neighbours. During a public meeting held by the group, Gregory told a man he identified as an associate of the Dunne family that, if he had any decency left, he should "walk straight into the Liffey and drown himself".

In a 2009 interview, Gregory rejected the notion that he was simply "anti-drugs", noting that alcohol, in his assessment, had done more damage in the inner city than heroin; his campaign, he said, had specifically been an "anti-heroin campaign", driven by the sight of dealers deliberately supplying heroin to children as young as twelve within their own community. Gregory believed the solution to the problem was multi-faceted, and worked on policy efforts spanning policing, service co-ordination and the rehabilitation of addicts. He was strongly supportive of increased Garda powers to tackle the drug trade and lobbied for the establishment of a body to seize criminal assets. In 1995 he proposed, in an article in The Irish Times, an approach that anticipated what would become the Criminal Assets Bureau, established in 1996 by Minister for Justice Nora Owen following the murder of journalist Veronica Guerin. In 1997, addressing a Dublin Corporation conference on drugs, Gregory publicly accused the Garda of "total failure" in dealing with the crisis, telling Assistant Commissioner Tom King that senior officers had allowed the north inner city to be "devastated" by inaction over the preceding fifteen years, and that around one hundred young people had lost their lives as a result.

Gregory was also critical of media coverage that, in his view, glamorised drug dealers, arguing that showing criminals enjoying a "luxurious lifestyle" without corresponding coverage of the harm they inflicted encouraged disadvantaged young people to see dealing as an easy route to wealth. He did not favour legalising drugs, including cannabis, but supported harm-reduction measures such as prescribing pure heroin, under medical supervision, to acutely addicted individuals for whom no other treatment had worked, citing supervised clinics he had visited in Switzerland.

==== Street traders' campaign ====
From 1982 Gregory was involved in the campaign by Dublin's street traders to hold their pitches against opposition from local businesses and the Gardaí. In July 1985, he joined a sit-down protest in support of the traders alongside Sinn Féin councillor Christy Burke and future Labour Party TD Joe Costello on Dublin's O'Connell Street; the protest followed clashes between traders and gardaí over casual trading on Henry Street and Mary Street, areas not officially designated for such trading. Gregory and Costello were subsequently charged with assault and obstruction, and Burke with insulting and threatening behaviour; Gregory told the crowd that gathered afterwards that traders had "a constitutional right to earn a living to rear your families and to provide for your families".

In January 1986, having repeatedly refused to sign a bond to keep the peace, which he believed would have obliged him to disassociate himself from the traders, Gregory was jailed for two weeks in Mountjoy Prison, alongside street traders Mary Holmes and Dolly Mangan. On his release, Gregory criticised Minister for Justice Michael Noonan for refusing to allow him a day's temporary release to attend a Dáil debate on teachers' pay. He later recalled that his time in Mountjoy coincided with the first diagnoses of AIDS among prisoners, at a time when fear and misinformation about the illness were widespread within the prison population.

== Political views ==
Gregory described himself throughout his life as a republican socialist, and consistently named Seamus Costello as the politician he most admired, saying he could easily imagine himself, rather than any government minister, having met Costello's fate. He argued that the struggle for social justice in Ireland could not be separated from the presence of British troops in Northern Ireland, comparing the conflict there in a 1985 interview to anti-imperialist struggles elsewhere in the world, while also criticising the Provisional IRA's military campaign as counterproductive. He maintained that the key task for any left-wing politician was to change the attitudes of working people towards the political establishment, arguing that this could only be achieved by engaging directly with the issues that concerned them, rather than through abstract ideological debate.

According to Maureen O'Sullivan, his long-time election agent and eventual successor, Gregory's guiding political principle was service to the community, and he sought solutions for his constituents based on rights rather than charity or clientelism. O'Sullivan also wrote that Gregory abhorred the tendency of politicians to place party interest ahead of the interests of the communities that elected them. Gregory was critical of what he saw as the largely middle-class composition of the contemporary Irish left, arguing this marked a significant change from the era when Official Sinn Féin's membership had been overwhelmingly working-class.

Gregory was the only TD to support a divorce bill put forward by Sinn Féin the Workers' Party (later the Workers' Party) in 1983, and in June 1984 he joined the party's two TDs in walking out of Leinster House during an address by United States President Ronald Reagan. He opposed both the 1991 and 2003 wars in Iraq and campaigned against the use of Shannon Airport by United States military aircraft, and in the 2000s he supported the Shell to Sea campaign in County Mayo. In 1994 he was part of an international corps of parliamentary observers sent to monitor South Africa's first democratic elections, and he visited the Palestinian occupied territories on two occasions and was part of a delegation to Cuba in 2001. He was also prominent in campaigns for the release of the Birmingham Six and Guildford Four.

Gregory always refused to wear a tie in the Dáil chamber, saying many of his constituents could not afford one; he was, by some accounts, inundated with letters of support for the stance.

On drugs policy, Gregory opposed the outright legalisation of any drug, including cannabis, but supported harm-reduction approaches for chronic heroin addiction, including medically supervised prescribing. He lobbied for tougher enforcement against dealers alongside the establishment of the Criminal Assets Bureau. A committed supporter of the Irish language, he taught through Irish for most of his teaching career. He continued to use it throughout his political life. He was a long-standing advocate for animal rights, particularly in his opposition to hare coursing, and in his final Dáil years expressed regret that greater progress had not been made on the issue.

Deeply interested in animal welfare, Gregory served as vice-president of the Irish Council Against Blood Sports and, in 1993, moved a Dáil private member's bill to ban live hare coursing; the bill was defeated by 104 votes to 16, though Gregory noted that some Fine Gael TDs broke the party whip to support it. He continued to call for a ban on coursing in the years that followed, describing his own single visit to a coursing meet as more than enough.

Gregory took a particular interest in the fate of Dublin street criminals who, in his assessment, were often glamorised or misrepresented by the media; when a Dublin businessman he did not name suggested in 2005 that Gregory's constituent Gerry Hutch was funding his election campaign, Gregory threatened legal action and the story was withdrawn. Gregory was portrayed on screen, played by actor Garrett Keogh, in the 2003 film Veronica Guerin; Gregory felt the portrayal was inaccurate, noting in particular that the film depicted him wearing a tie, which he said he never did.

== Personal life ==
Gregory never married and had no children, a fact he described in his final interview as one of his biggest regrets in life, though he was careful to say he did not blame this on his political career. He referred in that interview to "a certain amount of unrequited love" during his time at UCD, involving a fellow student from the southside of Dublin, though he declined to discuss the matter further. He was, from 1979, romantically involved for a period with Maureen O'Sullivan, who later became his election agent and eventual successor as TD; O'Sullivan recalled in a 2016 interview that the relationship had lasted a matter of months before settling into a close, lifelong friendship, and described Gregory, only half in jest, as "a Casanova" who many women who met him "fell in love with". At the time of his death, Gregory was in a long-term relationship with Annette Dolan.

A profile of Gregory published in the magazine In Dublin in 1982 described him as someone who "does not inspire affection, and is not interested in doing so", adding that "he has no personal life to speak of; he seldom takes a drink; he has supporters but few friends". Those who knew him well, however, attested to a warmer and more humorous side to his personality away from public view; O'Sullivan recalled him as "great company, a great teller of stories" who nonetheless "could be exasperating and grumpy". He was noted for his personal frugality, famously reusing old election posters from one campaign to the next rather than spend money on new material. Gregory lived at Sackville Gardens, Ballybough, with his brother Noel for most of his adult life.

== Death ==
Gregory died on 2 January 2009, aged 61, at St Francis Hospice, Raheny, following a year-long battle with stomach cancer. Annette Dolan, his long-term partner, had contacted Maureen O'Sullivan on the morning of his death; O'Sullivan later recalled sitting with him in the hours before he died, and that she did not cry until afterwards, believing he "wouldn't have appreciated tears". Gregory had continued to attend the Dáil most days during his illness, up to the final month of his life, and had made an unsuccessful effort to be given speaking time to address education cuts shortly before his death.

Following his death, tributes poured in from politicians across the political spectrum, recognising his contribution to Dublin's north inner city. Taoiseach Brian Cowen said Gregory had "served his community of the inner city at a national level with great dedication and distinction for over a quarter of a century", while former Taoiseach Bertie Ahern, Gregory's long-time constituency rival, described him as a politician who "gave total commitment to his constituents and made an undoubted difference to the city he loved".

A white and blue Starry Plough flag, associated with the socialist variant of Irish Republicanism, was draped on Gregory's coffin during his burial.

Around 600 mourners attended Gregory's funeral Mass at St Agatha's Church on North William Street on 7 January 2009, where he had once served as an altar boy. Those present included President Mary McAleese, Taoiseach Brian Cowen, former Taoiseach Bertie Ahern, and the leaders of the main opposition parties, alongside cultural and civic figures including film director Neil Jordan, former student and musician Liam Ó Maonlaí, businessman Bill Cullen, writer Nell McCafferty, former Supreme Court judge Hugh O'Flaherty and ICTU general secretary David Begg. The Mass was celebrated by family friend Fr Piaras Ó Duill and concelebrated by Auxiliary Bishop of Dublin Eamon Walsh; the homily was delivered by Fr Peter McVerry, who described Gregory as a man who had "made open-necked shirts respectable" and who told the congregation that "politicians come and go... but Tony Gregory will not be forgotten". Annette Dolan delivered a personal tribute during the prayers of the faithful, describing Gregory as a man "of principle and integrity who fought passionately for what he believed in". Maureen O'Sullivan, speaking on Gregory's behalf at the end of the Mass, noted that despite his prominence he had, for twenty-five years, been "systematically excluded by every political party" from the position of Lord Mayor of Dublin or any other senior role on Dublin City Council, and appealed to politicians who had not supported him in life to stay away from the private burial, telling the congregation that his "funeral is not a photo opportunity". The coffin was draped in the blue and white Starry Plough flag as it left the church, and Gregory was buried privately at Balgriffin Cemetery, with Socialist Party TD Joe Higgins delivering the graveside oration, as Gregory had requested before his death.

Earlier in his illness, Gregory had complained successfully to the Press Council of Ireland after the Evening Herald published a story about his diagnosis and sent a reporter to his Ballybough home to speak to his brother Noel; the Council found the newspaper had breached his privacy "at a time of distress and shock", a ruling that was upheld on appeal.

=== By-election ===
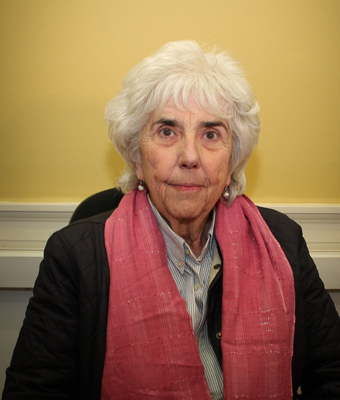
Maureen O'Sullivan, seen here in 2019, succeeded Gregory in representing Dublin Central in the Dáil from 2009 onwards

Colleagues of Gregory supported his long-time election agent, Dublin City Councillor Maureen O'Sullivan, at the Dublin Central by-election in June 2009. O'Sullivan won the seat, taking 7,639 first-preference votes (26.9%) and reaching 13,739 votes by the seventh count, just short of the quota. Fianna Fáil's vote in the constituency collapsed, with candidate Maurice Ahern, brother of Bertie Ahern, securing just 12.25%, compared with the 39% his brother had won as sitting Taoiseach at the 2007 general election. Fine Gael's Paschal Donohoe finished second on 6,439 first preferences, ahead of Labour's Ivana Bacik and Sinn Féin's Christy Burke, whose candidacy was controversially backed by Gregory's brother Noel rather than by O'Sullivan and the wider "Gregory group" of activists. O'Sullivan later reflected that she believed Gregory "would have been happy" that she stood, and retained the seat at the 2011 Irish general election.

== Legacy ==
Tony Gregory: The Biography of a True Irish Political Legend was published in 2011, written by early Gregory activist and Trinity College Dublin professor of social work Robbie Gilligan, and launched by Diarmaid Ferriter; Gregory's brother Noel criticised the launch event, as he was not allowed to speak. Reviewing the biography in The Irish Times, journalist Deaglán de Bréadún described Gregory as Ireland's own "Jesse Jackson", drawing on the book's citation of a line from the film The Commitments describing north Dublin's working class as "the blacks of Dublin", and argued that it would be inaccurate to portray Gregory as a mere clientelist politician given his lifelong socialism. De Bréadún noted, however, that the book said relatively little about Gregory's relationship with his father or the full circumstances of his IRA membership as a young man, and suggested a definitive biography had yet to be written.

In August 2019, an exhibition on Gregory's life was unveiled at Charleville Mall Library, on his old patch of the North Strand, with fellow activists Mick Rafferty and Fergus McCabe present alongside his brother Noel. Rafferty, recalling Gregory's consistency compared with more "clientelistic" politicians, compared a subsequent 2016 government-commissioned investment plan for the north inner city, the Mulvey report, to "the Gregory deal for slow learners". Mary Muldowney, Dublin City Council's historian in residence for the area, described Gregory at the exhibition's opening as a "true working class hero" and argued that the history of ordinary people such as those he represented had "as much value" in the historical record as that of any government minister.

== Footnotes ==
Dáil	Election	Deputy (Party)	Deputy (Party)	Deputy (Party)	Deputy (Party)
19th	1969	Frank Cluskey (Lab)	Vivion de Valera (FF)	Thomas J. Fitzpatrick (FF)	Maurice E. Dockrell (FG)
20th	1973	Frank Cluskey (Lab)	Vivion de Valera (FF)	Thomas J. Fitzpatrick (FF)	Maurice E. Dockrell (FG)
21st	1977	Constituency abolished			

Dáil	Election	Deputy (Party)	Deputy (Party)	Deputy (Party)	Deputy (Party)	Deputy (Party)
22nd	1981	Bertie Ahern (FF)	Michael Keating (FG)	Alice Glenn (FG)	Michael O'Leary (Lab)	George Colley (FF)
23rd	1982 (Feb)	Bertie Ahern (FF)	Michael Keating (FG)	Tony Gregory (Ind.)	Michael O'Leary (Lab)	George Colley (FF)
24th	1982 (Nov)	Bertie Ahern (FF)	Michael Keating (FG)	Tony Gregory (Ind.)	Alice Glenn (FG)	George Colley (FF)
24th	1983 by-election	Bertie Ahern (FF)	Michael Keating (FG)	Tony Gregory (Ind.)	Alice Glenn (FG)	Tom Leonard (FF)
25th	1987	Bertie Ahern (FF)	Michael Keating (PDs)	Tony Gregory (Ind.)	Dermot Fitzpatrick (FF)	John Stafford (FF)
26th	1989	Bertie Ahern (FF)	Pat Lee (FG)	Tony Gregory (Ind.)	Dermot Fitzpatrick (FF)	John Stafford (FF)
27th	1992	Bertie Ahern (FF)	Jim Mitchell (FG)	Tony Gregory (Ind.)	Joe Costello (Lab)	4 seats 1992–2016
28th	1997	Bertie Ahern (FF)	Jim Mitchell (FG)	Tony Gregory (Ind.)	Marian McGennis (FF)	4 seats 1992–2016
29th	2002	Bertie Ahern (FF)	Dermot Fitzpatrick (FF)	Tony Gregory (Ind.)	Joe Costello (Lab)	4 seats 1992–2016
30th	2007	Bertie Ahern (FF)	Cyprian Brady (FF)	Tony Gregory (Ind.)	Joe Costello (Lab)	4 seats 1992–2016
30th	2009 by-election	Bertie Ahern (FF)	Cyprian Brady (FF)	Maureen O'Sullivan (Ind.)	Joe Costello (Lab)	4 seats 1992–2016
31st	2011	Mary Lou McDonald (SF)	Paschal Donohoe (FG)	Maureen O'Sullivan (Ind.)	Joe Costello (Lab)	4 seats 1992–2016
32nd	2016	Mary Lou McDonald (SF)	Paschal Donohoe (FG)	Maureen O'Sullivan (Ind.)	3 seats 2016–2020	
33rd	2020	Mary Lou McDonald (SF)	Paschal Donohoe (FG)	Gary Gannon (SD)	Neasa Hourigan (GP)	4 seats from 2020
34th	2024	Mary Lou McDonald (SF)	Paschal Donohoe (FG)	Gary Gannon (SD)	Marie Sherlock (Lab)	4 seats from 2020
34th	2026 by-election	Mary Lou McDonald (SF)	Daniel Ennis (SD)	Gary Gannon (SD)	Marie Sherlock (Lab)	4 seats from 2020
