= Maurice Ahern =

Irish former politician (born 1938)

Dublin City Councillor
- In office June 1999 – June 2009
- Constituency: Cabra–Glasnevin

Lord Mayor of Dublin
- In office June 2000 – June 2001
- Preceded by: Mary Freehill
- Succeeded by: Michael Mulcahy

Personal details
- Born: 1938 (age 87–88) Dublin, Ireland
- Party: Fianna Fáil
- Spouse: Moira Murray
- Children: 6
- Relatives: Bertie Ahern (brother); Noel Ahern (brother)

Maurice Ahern (born 1938) is an Irish former Fianna Fáil politician. He was a member of Dublin City Council for the Cabra–Glasnevin local electoral area from 1999 to 2009. He was first elected at the 1999 local elections, topping the poll. He was re-elected at the 2004 local elections. He was the Lord Mayor of Dublin in 2000, and formerly Leader of the Fianna Fáil group on the council. He was a member of the Irish Sports Council.

He is married to Moira Murray, and they have five sons and one daughter. His eldest son, Dylan Ahern, was found dead in his apartment on 22 November 2009.

He is the elder brother of Bertie Ahern and Noel Ahern, both of whom served as Fianna Fáil TDs, Bertie Ahern having served as Taoiseach from 1997 to 2008.

He was the Fianna Fáil candidate in the Dublin Central by-election which was held on 5 June 2009. He lost that election being beaten into 5th place. On the same day, he also lost his council seat in the 2009 local elections.

Civic offices
Preceded by Mary Freehill	Lord Mayor of Dublin; 2000–2001	Succeeded by Michael Mulcahy
