= Maureen O'Sullivan (politician) =

Irish former politician (born 1951)

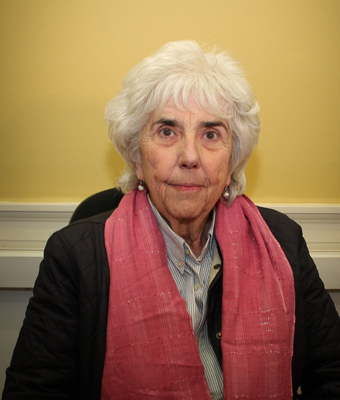
- O'Sullivan in 2019

Teachta Dála
- In office June 2009 – February 2020
- Constituency: Dublin Central

Personal details
- Born: 10 March 1951 (age 75) East Wall, Dublin, Ireland
- Party: Independent
- Education: University College Dublin

Maureen O'Sullivan (born 10 March 1951) is an Irish former independent politician who served as a Teachta Dála (TD) for the Dublin Central constituency from 2009 to 2020.

== Early life ==
A native of Dublin's East Wall, she was educated locally at Mount Carmel school. After completing a BA at University College Dublin, she then went on to work as an English and History teacher and guidance counsellor in a secondary school in Baldoyle, a position she held for 30 years.

== Political career ==
She was a member of Tony Gregory's local political organisation in the 1970s, first canvassing for him and later serving as his election agent. She was co-opted onto Dublin City Council for the North Inner City local electoral area from September 2008 to June 2009, after the retirement of Mick Rafferty. After the death of Tony Gregory, she won the resulting by-election which was held on the same day as the local elections where she also won a seat on Dublin City Council, for the North Inner City local electoral area. Marie Metcalfe was co-opted to take the seat due to the dual mandate rule.

O'Sullivan was re-elected to the Dáil at the 2011 general election. She joined the Dáil Technical group which gave independents and minor parties more speaking time in Dáil debates.

She described a proposal for political gender quota legislation as "tokenistic" and that women were able to get themselves nominated for election.

In December 2015, Maureen O'Sullivan and fellow independent TDs Clare Daly and Mick Wallace each put forward offers of a €5,000 surety for a 23-year-old man being prosecuted under terrorism legislation in the Special Criminal Court in Dublin charged with membership of an illegal dissident republican terrorist organisation.

After the 2016 general election she unsuccessfully stood for election as Ceann Comhairle. She joined a technical group aligned with Independents 4 Change, while remaining outside the Independents 4 Change party. O'Sullivan was criticised by the brother of late TD Tony Gregory, over an allegedly false claim made in her election literature.

On 16 January 2020, O'Sullivan announced she would not be standing in the February 2020 general election.

Dáil	Election	Deputy (Party)	Deputy (Party)	Deputy (Party)	Deputy (Party)
19th	1969	Frank Cluskey (Lab)	Vivion de Valera (FF)	Thomas J. Fitzpatrick (FF)	Maurice E. Dockrell (FG)
20th	1973	Frank Cluskey (Lab)	Vivion de Valera (FF)	Thomas J. Fitzpatrick (FF)	Maurice E. Dockrell (FG)
21st	1977	Constituency abolished			

Dáil	Election	Deputy (Party)	Deputy (Party)	Deputy (Party)	Deputy (Party)	Deputy (Party)
22nd	1981	Bertie Ahern (FF)	Michael Keating (FG)	Alice Glenn (FG)	Michael O'Leary (Lab)	George Colley (FF)
23rd	1982 (Feb)	Bertie Ahern (FF)	Michael Keating (FG)	Tony Gregory (Ind.)	Michael O'Leary (Lab)	George Colley (FF)
24th	1982 (Nov)	Bertie Ahern (FF)	Michael Keating (FG)	Tony Gregory (Ind.)	Alice Glenn (FG)	George Colley (FF)
24th	1983 by-election	Bertie Ahern (FF)	Michael Keating (FG)	Tony Gregory (Ind.)	Alice Glenn (FG)	Tom Leonard (FF)
25th	1987	Bertie Ahern (FF)	Michael Keating (PDs)	Tony Gregory (Ind.)	Dermot Fitzpatrick (FF)	John Stafford (FF)
26th	1989	Bertie Ahern (FF)	Pat Lee (FG)	Tony Gregory (Ind.)	Dermot Fitzpatrick (FF)	John Stafford (FF)
27th	1992	Bertie Ahern (FF)	Jim Mitchell (FG)	Tony Gregory (Ind.)	Joe Costello (Lab)	4 seats 1992–2016
28th	1997	Bertie Ahern (FF)	Jim Mitchell (FG)	Tony Gregory (Ind.)	Marian McGennis (FF)	4 seats 1992–2016
29th	2002	Bertie Ahern (FF)	Dermot Fitzpatrick (FF)	Tony Gregory (Ind.)	Joe Costello (Lab)	4 seats 1992–2016
30th	2007	Bertie Ahern (FF)	Cyprian Brady (FF)	Tony Gregory (Ind.)	Joe Costello (Lab)	4 seats 1992–2016
30th	2009 by-election	Bertie Ahern (FF)	Cyprian Brady (FF)	Maureen O'Sullivan (Ind.)	Joe Costello (Lab)	4 seats 1992–2016
31st	2011	Mary Lou McDonald (SF)	Paschal Donohoe (FG)	Maureen O'Sullivan (Ind.)	Joe Costello (Lab)	4 seats 1992–2016
32nd	2016	Mary Lou McDonald (SF)	Paschal Donohoe (FG)	Maureen O'Sullivan (Ind.)	3 seats 2016–2020	
33rd	2020	Mary Lou McDonald (SF)	Paschal Donohoe (FG)	Gary Gannon (SD)	Neasa Hourigan (GP)	4 seats from 2020
34th	2024	Mary Lou McDonald (SF)	Paschal Donohoe (FG)	Gary Gannon (SD)	Marie Sherlock (Lab)	4 seats from 2020
34th	2026 by-election	Mary Lou McDonald (SF)	Daniel Ennis (SD)	Gary Gannon (SD)	Marie Sherlock (Lab)	4 seats from 2020
