= Alice Glenn =

Irish politician (1921–2011)

- Glenn in 1982

Teachta Dála
- In office November 1982 – February 1987
- In office June 1981 – February 1982
- Constituency: Dublin Central

Personal details
- Born: Alicia Duffy; 17 December 1921 Dublin, Ireland
- Died: 16 December 2011 (aged 89) Dalkey, Dublin, Ireland
- Party: Fine Gael
- Spouse: William Glenn (m. 1949)
- Children: 4

Alice Glenn (née Duffy; 17 December 1921 – 16 December 2011) was an Irish Fine Gael politician who served as a Teachta Dála (TD) for the Dublin Central constituency from 1981 to 1982 and 1982 to 1987.

Although only briefly a part of national politics in Ireland, Glenn became one of the most prominent voices of social conservatism in Ireland in the 1980s and was particularly eminent during the 1986 referendum on divorce. Glenn was an outspoken critic of contraceptives, abortion, divorce and other attempts to liberalise Irish society, and much of her commentary was deemed memorable and influential. However, Glenn's political career ended in late 1986 when it emerged to the public that Glenn had called the leaders of every religion but Catholicism in Ireland "enemies of the people". Glenn refused to retract the comments and she was widely condemned as sectarian and bigoted, including by members of her own party. Glenn resigned rather than be expelled by Fine Gael, and attempted to stand as an independent at the 1987 general election, but her vote collapsed. She remained in local politics until 1991 but thereafter exited public life.

== Early and private life ==
She was born in 1921 at Usher's Quay, Dublin, the eldest of ten children of (Arthur) Leo Duffy, a car mechanic, and his wife Mary (née Joyce), a dressmaker. She grew up on the quays, later moving with her family out to the inner suburb of Cabra. She was educated locally before attending the Haslem School of Dress Designing. She subsequently worked as a dressmaker.

In April 1949 she married William Glenn, who at that time was a cadet in the Irish Air Force. The early years of their marriage were marked by tragedy and difficulty; following the birth of their first child, Alice suffered two stillbirths. The second stillbirth heavily damaged Alice's internal health and required extensive surgeries to treat. In the aftermath, she suffered for many years from depression, lasting until the birth of her second child.

== Political career ==
=== Dublin City Councillor ===
Glenn was raised in a family which had always supported Fine Gael and thus was so inclined herself. However, she was not formally a member of the party until she became incensed by the decisions of Fianna Fáil ministers during the onset of the Troubles in 1970. Already active in a number of women's social clubs in inner-city Dublin, Glenn joined her local Fine Gael branch and rapidly advanced in seniority. At the 1973 Irish general election was placed up for election in Dublin North-Central as one of the very few women candidates of that entire election. Although she did not get elected, she polled well enough for Fine Gael to place long-term confidence in her. Glenn rebounded by becoming a Dublin City Councillor for the Drumcondra local electoral area the next year in 1974. Her husband William brushed aside suggestions that Alice's political career could damage his prospects in the Air Force and remained supportive of her ambitions.

An early example of her conservatism was demonstrated in 1978 when Glenn made a speech in which she suggested 10,000 Irish women should give up their jobs in the public sector in order to decrease men's unemployment.

=== Dáil Éireann ===
==== Election struggles ====
Glenn was an unsuccessful candidate for Dublin Finglas constituency at the 1977 general election. In-fighting with her running mate Luke Belton was partially to blame for the result, as was a redrawing of constituency boundaries (The 1977 election was the only election in which the Dublin Finglas constituency was contested). Further feuding with Belton would see Glenn denied the office of Lord Mayor of Dublin in both 1978 and 1980, and in 1980 Belton was almost successful in pulling Glenn from Fine Gael's local election ticket until party leader Garret FitzGerald personally intervened.

It was at the 1981 general election that Glenn was elected to the Dáil when she became a TD for Dublin Central. She would only be able to hold it for eight months after the government collapsed over a failed budget and she lost out at the first general election of 1982. Glenn attempted to rebound by seeking to become a senator, however here too she was unsuccessful.

At the October 1982 Fine Gael ardfheis, Glenn embarrassed Garrett FitzGerald by reminding delegates of his pledge to introduce a constitutional amendment that would uphold the status quo on abortion in Ireland, a decision FitzGerald was in the process of reconsidering.

In the wake of having lost both a Dáil and Seanad election, once again an attempt was made to remove Glenn from the Fine Gael ticket in the run-up to the November 1982 election, however, Glenn survived and was able to regain her Dáil seat, beginning what would be a full five years in office uninterrupted.

==== National politics ====
Glenn entered into her first full term as a TD, and into her period of greatest prominence within Irish politics.

In April 1983, Glenn was one of eight Fine Gael TDs to defy the party and vote against the Fine Gael-Labour Party coalition's proposed wording to the constitutional amendment on abortion. The government's wording included a negative prohibition, namely that nothing in the constitution should be interpreted as granting a right to abortion. Glenn, along with Joe Doyle and other colleagues endorsed the Fianna Fáil alternative wording that granted a "right to life to the unborn, with due regard to the equal right of the mother". In November 1984, legislation to make contraception available to people over 18 was brought before the Dáil; Glenn remarked "What man wants anything to do with a girl who has been used and abused by any man who comes along with condoms?".

By now Glenn was becoming the female face of conservatism in Ireland, and many journalists and commentators began to compare Glenn to the United Kingdom's Margaret Thatcher. It was a comparison that did not displease Glenn, and shortly thereafter she also publicly declare her admiration for the United States' Ronald Reagan. In June 1984 she and her husband travelled to Taiwan to attend a congress of the World Anti-Communist League. Glenn also supported the Contra forces in Nicaragua.

In February 1985 Glenn lost the party whip again voting against the bill to grant those over 18 the right to purchase contraceptives, however, she was readmitted to the party in November 1985 when it became clear to Fine Gael they had no other viable candidates in her constituency to replace her with.

In 1986 the Fine Gael-Labour government held a referendum to legalise divorce in Ireland and during the campaign over the summer, Glenn became one of the most outspoken voices on the anti-divorce side. Glenn was able to capture the fears of many women when, as part of the campaign, she quipped that women voting for divorce was like "turkeys voting in favour of Christmas". The line became one of the most often discussed and quoted sentiments of the campaign. The referendum saw the no side victorious and it was not until another referendum in 1995 that divorce would be legalised in Ireland.

Although the result was in Glenn's favour, it made her position in Fine Gael effectively untenable, as she was increasingly becoming a pariah within the party. Besides conflicting with the majority of Fine Gael TDs, Glenn further estranged herself from the party by condemning the government's plans to reform childcare laws as well as touting eurosceptic viewpoints.

=== "Enemies of the People" comment and end of political career ===
In November 1986, just days before a Fine Gael selection convention in Dublin Central, Glenn caused a political and social scandal after she described leaders of all other faiths in Ireland besides Catholicism as "enemies of the people". Fine Gael immediately released an official statement repudiating Glenn's comments and many fellow Fine Gael TDs such as Alan Shatter condemned the comments as sectarian, however, Glenn herself declared she "stood over every word".

In the aftermath of the scandal, Fine Gael dropped Glenn from their ticket, and on 9 December 1986, she resigned from the Fine Gael parliamentary party ahead of a proposed motion to expel her.

She fought the 1987 general election as an independent candidate but failed to be elected, polling 4% of the vote and losing her deposit. She retired from politics following the loss of her Dublin City Council seat in 1991.

== Political views and profile ==
Glenn was a highly vocal and prominent social conservative during her time as a TD. Glenn stated her own beliefs were a “Judaeo-Christian ethic based on the God-given tradition of eternal law" as opposed to a "humanist vision which rejects God and traditional values". Glenn opposed moves to introduce divorce, abortion and contraceptives to Ireland and rejected calls to reform childcare, suggesting such legalisation would interfere with the family.

Glenn cited Arthur Griffith and Daniel O'Connell as political heroes, and welcomed comparisons to Ronald Reagan and Margaret Thatcher. Unusually for a member of Fine Gael, she also cited the founder of their primary rival Fianna Fáil Éamon de Valera as an inspiration, specifically praising his social conservatism by stating "Thank God for Dev and what he has done. Thank God for his Constitution and its moral values; what he did was right.” She frequently involved religious rhetoric; once upon being criticised for a lack of empathy towards couples whose marriages had failed, Glenn retorted "It wasn’t me who said that what God has joined together, let no man pull asunder; it was Christ". Following her departure from Fine Gael, she described the organisation as a "once great party, now going down the road to depravity and defiance of God’s law".

In 1985, Glenn was name checked on the Christy Moore song Delirium Tremens.

== Personal life ==
Despite being a prominent advocate against divorce, Glenn had a sister abandoned by her husband while one of Glenn's own sons was a divorcee who lost custody of his daughter. Glenn raised the daughter herself for several years until she went to live with her mother in Australia, which left Glenn in anguish.

== Death ==
She died on 16 December 2011, the day before her 90th birthday. She had suffered a long illness. She was buried in Glasnevin cemetery.

| Dáil | Election | Deputy (Party) | Deputy (Party) | Deputy (Party) | Deputy (Party) |
|---|---|---|---|---|---|
| 19th | 1969 | Frank Cluskey (Lab) | Vivion de Valera (FF) | Thomas J. Fitzpatrick (FF) | Maurice E. Dockrell (FG) |
| 20th | 1973 | Frank Cluskey (Lab) | Vivion de Valera (FF) | Thomas J. Fitzpatrick (FF) | Maurice E. Dockrell (FG) |
| 21st | 1977 | Constituency abolished | | | |

| Dáil | Election | Deputy (Party) | Deputy (Party) | Deputy (Party) | Deputy (Party) | Deputy (Party) |
|---|---|---|---|---|---|---|
| 22nd | 1981 | Bertie Ahern (FF) | Michael Keating (FG) | Alice Glenn (FG) | Michael O'Leary (Lab) | George Colley (FF) |
| 23rd | 1982 (Feb) | Bertie Ahern (FF) | Michael Keating (FG) | Tony Gregory (Ind.) | Michael O'Leary (Lab) | George Colley (FF) |
| 24th | 1982 (Nov) | Bertie Ahern (FF) | Michael Keating (FG) | Tony Gregory (Ind.) | Alice Glenn (FG) | George Colley (FF) |
| 24th | 1983 by-election | Bertie Ahern (FF) | Michael Keating (FG) | Tony Gregory (Ind.) | Alice Glenn (FG) | Tom Leonard (FF) |
| 25th | 1987 | Bertie Ahern (FF) | Michael Keating (PDs) | Tony Gregory (Ind.) | Dermot Fitzpatrick (FF) | John Stafford (FF) |
| 26th | 1989 | Bertie Ahern (FF) | Pat Lee (FG) | Tony Gregory (Ind.) | Dermot Fitzpatrick (FF) | John Stafford (FF) |
| 27th | 1992 | Bertie Ahern (FF) | Jim Mitchell (FG) | Tony Gregory (Ind.) | Joe Costello (Lab) | 4 seats 1992–2016 |
| 28th | 1997 | Bertie Ahern (FF) | Jim Mitchell (FG) | Tony Gregory (Ind.) | Marian McGennis (FF) | 4 seats 1992–2016 |
| 29th | 2002 | Bertie Ahern (FF) | Dermot Fitzpatrick (FF) | Tony Gregory (Ind.) | Joe Costello (Lab) | 4 seats 1992–2016 |
| 30th | 2007 | Bertie Ahern (FF) | Cyprian Brady (FF) | Tony Gregory (Ind.) | Joe Costello (Lab) | 4 seats 1992–2016 |
| 30th | 2009 by-election | Bertie Ahern (FF) | Cyprian Brady (FF) | Maureen O'Sullivan (Ind.) | Joe Costello (Lab) | 4 seats 1992–2016 |
| 31st | 2011 | Mary Lou McDonald (SF) | Paschal Donohoe (FG) | Maureen O'Sullivan (Ind.) | Joe Costello (Lab) | 4 seats 1992–2016 |
| 32nd | 2016 | Mary Lou McDonald (SF) | Paschal Donohoe (FG) | Maureen O'Sullivan (Ind.) | 3 seats 2016–2020 | |
| 33rd | 2020 | Mary Lou McDonald (SF) | Paschal Donohoe (FG) | Gary Gannon (SD) | Neasa Hourigan (GP) | 4 seats from 2020 |
| 34th | 2024 | Mary Lou McDonald (SF) | Paschal Donohoe (FG) | Gary Gannon (SD) | Marie Sherlock (Lab) | 4 seats from 2020 |
| 34th | 2026 by-election | Mary Lou McDonald (SF) | | Gary Gannon (SD) | Marie Sherlock (Lab) | 4 seats from 2020 |
