= 1991 Dublin Corporation election =

Part of the 1991 Irish local elections

- 27 June 1991

52 seats on Dublin City Council
	First party	Second party	Third party
Party	Fianna Fáil	Labour	Fine Gael
Seats won	20	10	6
Seat change	▼6	▲8	▼7
	Fourth party	Fifth party	Sixth party
Party	Workers' Party	Green	Sinn Féin
Seats won	5	4	1
Seat change	▼1	▲4	Steady
	Seventh party	Eighth party
Party	Progressive Democrats	Independent
Seats won	1	5
Seat change	▲1	▲1
- Map showing the area of Dublin City Council
Council control after election
Fianna Fáil
Workers Party

An election to Dublin City Council took place on 27 June 1991 as part of that year's Irish local elections. 52 councillors were elected from twelve local electoral areas (LEAs) for a five-year term of office on the electoral system of proportional representation by means of the single transferable vote (PR-STV). This term was extended twice, first to 1998, then to 1999.

== Results by party ==
Party	Seats	±	First Pref. votes	FPv%	±%
Fianna Fáil	20	▼6	49,210	32.5	
Labour	10	▲8	19,384	12.8	
Fine Gael	6	▼7	21,942	14.5	
Workers' Party	5	▼1	14,224	9.4	
Green	4	▲4	8,886	5.9	
Sinn Féin	1	Steady	7,104	4.7	
Progressive Democrats	1	▲1	5,071	3.4	
Independent	5	▲1	25,449	16.8	
Totals	52	Steady	151,270	100.0	—

== Results by local electoral area ==
=== Artane ===
Artane - 4 seats
Party	Candidate	FPv%	Count											
Party	Candidate	FPv%	1	2	3	4	5	6	7	8	9	10	11	12
Fianna Fáil	Senator Seán Haughey*	27.3%	2,976											
Labour	Paddy Bourke	11.3%	1,236	1,268	1,280	1,294	1,306	1,322	1,347	1,356	1,490	1,601	1,729	1,969
Sinn Féin	Larry O'Toole	10.4%	1,137	1,158	1,168	1,174	1,181	1,193	1,206	1,252	1,274	1,305	1,419	1,606
Labour	Tommy Broughan	9.9%	1,083	1,124	1,140	1,164	1,174	1,195	1,262	1,282	1,373	1,445	1,583	2,073
Workers' Party	John Curry	8.2%	896	919	932	949	952	961	1,012	1,050	1,094	1,185	1,327	
Fianna Fáil	Ita Green*	7.5%	815	1,221	1,226	1,252	1,253	1,308	1,331	1,719	1,773	1,883	1,999	2,089
Independent	Finian McGrath	4.7%	509	527	537	567	569	605	659	678	740	881		
Green	Bronwen Maher	4.5%	493	505	516	534	537	581	620	638	720			
Fine Gael	Kathy Moore	3.2%	354	366	368	379	576	602	621	626				
Fianna Fáil	Jim Howard	3.2%	348	539	541	554	558	567	581					
Independent	Joe Dowling	2.5%	277	288	299	327	331	346						
Independent	John O'Gorman	2.3%	248	253	263	269	271							
Fine Gael	Philip Marsh	2.1%	225	231	233	249								
Independent	Austin McCoy	1.9%	209	217	222									
Independent	Vincent Quinn	1%	110	116										
Electorate: 26,692 Valid: 10,916 (40.9%) Spoilt: 154 Quota: 2,184 Turnout: 11,070 (41.5%)

=== Ballyfermot ===
Ballyfermot - 4 seats
Party	Candidate	FPv%	Count											
Party	Candidate	FPv%	1	2	3	4	5	6	7	8	9	10	11	12
Labour	Michael Conaghan	18.7%	2,130	2,137	2,197	2,240	2,270	2,297						
Fianna Fáil	Senator Olga Bennett*	15.6%	1,774	1,852	1,896	1,906	1,943	2,220	2,263	2,322				
Independent	Vincent Jackson	13.8%	1,575	1,607	1,624	1,632	1,737	1,774	2,100	2,275	2,276	2,282		
Workers' Party	Tomas MacGiolla TD*	8.3%	949	973	1,008	1,336	1,408	1,431	1,516	1,675	1,678	1,683	1,782	1,948
Fine Gael	Tom Corcoran	6.1%	694	700	711	720	736	746	767	781	787	790	1,316	1,416
Fine Gael	Charlie McManus*	6%	680	692	712	713	722	734	738	753	756	757		
Fianna Fáil	Gregg Craig	5.5%	627	657	667	672	690	832	848	885	888	910	940	
Sinn Féin	Noel Kavanagh	5%	569	578	590	605	629	636	678					
Independent	Marian Doyle	4.3%	495	504	529	542	582	591						
Fianna Fáil	Michael Delaney*	4.3%	493	536	541	544	569							
Workers' Party	Linda Kavanagh	3.7%	423	425	446									
Independent	Paul Guiden	3.7%	419	440	451	457								
Green	Cecilia Armelin	2.5%	286	287										
Fianna Fáil	Robert Ryan	2%	232											
Independent	Reginald Norton	0.4%	47											
Electorate: 26,145 Valid: 11,393 (43.6%) Spoilt: 138 Quota: 2,279 Turnout: 11,531 (44.1%)

=== Cabra ===
Cabra - 3 seats
Party	Candidate	FPv%	Count												
Party	Candidate	FPv%	1	2	3	4	5	6	7	8	9	10	11	12	13
Fianna Fáil	Dermot Fitzpatrick TD*	16.5%	1,802	1,807	1,815	1,833	1,855	1,891	1,921	1,962	2,025	2,464	2,574	2,989	
Fianna Fáil	Patrick Farry*	13.9%	1,516	1,518	1,524	1,541	1,557	1,571	1,591	1,628	1,693	2,033	2,154	2,433	2,600
Fine Gael	Jim Mitchell TD	10.7%	1,164	1,169	1,175	1,188	1,206	1,455	1,497	1,558	1,584	1,618	1,698	2,004	2,071
Independent	Sean Clerkin	10.4%	1,136	1,142	1,146	1,161	1,177	1,194	1,217	1,302	1,361	1,388	1,606		
Fianna Fáil	Willie O'Byrne	8.5%	922	926	931	958	975	1,000	1,012	1,025	1,089				
Labour	Cecelia Rafferty	7.2%	786	792	809	840	877	903	1,130	1,335	1,410	1,460	1,738	1,953	1,981
Independent	Sean Coultry	7.1%	770	775	785	824	872	885	938	1,026	1,179	1,226			
Sinn Féin	Mick Finnegan	5.5%	603	603	765	782	819	843	863	877					
Green	Joe Baker	4.6%	498	509	514	529	569	579	638						
Workers' Party	Carol Tiernan	4.2%	453	456	477	494	524	532							
Fine Gael	John Kearney	3.5%	386	388	395	417	441								
Independent	Ambrose O'Shea	2.5%	275	278	279										
Independent	Gaye McEvoy	2.5%	273	282	284	328									
Sinn Féin	Anne Speed	2.3%	256	259											
Independent	Brendan Price	0.6%	65												
Electorate: 24,124 Valid: 10,905 (45.2%) Spoilt: 108 Quota: 2,727 Turnout: 11,013 (45.7%)

=== Clontarf ===
Clontarf - 5 seats
Party	Candidate	FPv%	Count										
Party	Candidate	FPv%	1	2	3	4	5	6	7	8	9	10	11
Independent	Sean Dublin Bay Rockall Loftus*	18.4%	3,411										
Fianna Fáil	Ivor Callely TD*	15%	2,792	2,822	2,826	2,868	2,927	2,981	3,032	3,110			
Fine Gael	Richard Bruton TD	12.9%	2,393	2,438	2,446	2,472	2,525	2,646	2,715	2,872	3,077	4,198	
Fianna Fáil	John Stafford TD*	9.4%	1,747	1,766	1,773	1,794	1,840	1,867	1,898	1,966	2,224	2,413	2,539
Fianna Fáil	Joe Burke*	9.2%	1,713	1,721	1,726	1,738	1,747	1,780	1,812	1,847	2,062	2,147	2,241
Fine Gael	Pat Lee TD*	7.3%	1,361	1,387	1,394	1,411	1,446	1,469	1,490	1,558	1,721		
Labour	Derek McDowell	6.6%	1,225	1,247	1,254	1,287	1,315	1,374	1,792	2,156	2,343	2,461	2,827
Independent	Dominic Noonan	5.6%	1,048	1,065	1,079	1,101	1,146	1,219	1,257	1,435			
Workers' Party	Triona Dooney	4.1%	767	780	786	819	835	919					
Green	Steve Rawson	3.9%	725	768	779	841	923	1,055	1,241				
Independent	Patricia Coonagh	3%	559	576	586	625	670						
Independent	Gavin O Fiachain	2%	376	413	417	470							
Independent	Kate Nugent	1.9%	348	384	397								
Independent	Michael Reeves	0.5%	96	100									
Electorate: 37,155 Valid: 18,561 (50%) Spoilt: 126 Quota: 3,094 Turnout: 18,687 (50.3%)

=== Crumlin ===
Crumlin - 4 seats
Party	Candidate	FPv%	Count							
Party	Candidate	FPv%	1	2	3	4	5	6	7	8
Fine Gael	Gay Mitchell TD*	21.8%	2,287							
Workers' Party	Eric Byrne TD*	19.9%	2,081	2,100						
Labour	Joe Connolly	14.9%	1,557	1,573	1,585	1,648	1,759	1,879	1,912	2,328
Fianna Fáil	Ben Briscoe TD*	14.1%	1,477	1,490	1,597	1,622	1,669	1,720	1,906	2,027
Green	Mary Bowers	6%	623	631	633	727	774	930	946	
Fianna Fáil	Etain O'Moore	5.9%	617	622	739	758	780	812	1,101	1,218
Fianna Fáil	Damien Murray	4.3%	453	459	519	535	549	579		
Independent	Seamus Concannon	3.8%	401	405	412	452	505			
Sinn Féin	Martin McGovern	3.3%	342	345	349					
Fianna Fáil	Pat Tuffy	3.2%	332	334						
Fine Gael	Ruairi McGinley	2.9%	299	416	427	440				
Electorate: 28,341 Valid: 10,469 (36.9%) Spoilt: 138 Quota: 2,094 Turnout: 10,607 (37.4%)

=== Donaghmede ===
Donaghmede - 5 seats
Party	Candidate	FPv%	Count												
Party	Candidate	FPv%	1	2	3	4	5	6	7	8	9	10	11	12	13
Fianna Fáil	Liam Fitzgerald TD*	19.6%	2,894												
Labour	Seán Kenny*	14.2%	2,097	2,147	2,177	2,205	2,211	2,295	2,709						
Fianna Fáil	Martin Brady	14.1%	2,086	2,247	2,304	2,567									
Workers' Party	Pat McCartan TD*	8.3%	1,233	1,256	1,277	1,289	1,292	1,340	1,421	1,503	1,559	1,769	2,407	2,535	
Green	Sadhbh O'Neill	5.5%	809	820	861	886	891	1,036	1,086	1,140	1,230	1,395	1,503	1,755	1,787
Fine Gael	Brian Monaghan	5.2%	773	840	874	994	1,071	1,130	1,148	1,156	1,219	1,307	1,357		
Workers' Party	Angela Loscher	4.8%	704	707	720	736	737	753	818	871	886	946			
Fine Gael	Niamh Cosgrave	4.7%	691	700	716	733	734	838	886	906	1,376	1,487	1,548	1,751	1,785
Independent	Gerry Clerkin	4.6%	686	699	745	754	755	779	811	828	847				
Labour	Ann Carter	4.6%	675	689	700	718	720	751							
Progressive Democrats	Eamon Pitts	4.4%	648	655	674	691	692								
Fine Gael	Barney McLoughlin	4.3%	643	649	667	696	699	810	817	825					
Fianna Fáil	Rose Daly	3.3%	487	547	567										
Independent	James Connolly	2.5%	372	375											
Electorate: 36,307 Valid: 14,798 (40.8%) Spoilt: 146 Quota: 2,467 Turnout: 14,944 (41.2%)

=== Drumcondra ===
Drumcondra - 5 seats
Party	Candidate	FPv%	Count													
Party	Candidate	FPv%	1	2	3	4	5	6	7	8	9	10	11	12	13	14
Fianna Fáil	Noel Ahern*	19.4%	2,745													
Fianna Fáil	Michael Barrett TD*	13.4%	1,902	2,123	2,139	2,143	2,254	2,293	2,576							
Labour	Roisin Shortall	11.1%	1,579	1,593	1,603	1,615	1,623	1,673	1,697	1,711	1,749	1,806	1,852	2,446		
Workers' Party	Eamonn O'Brien*	7.7%	1,091	1,096	1,106	1,328	1,352	1,370	1,376	1,379	1,397	1,423	1,581	1,861	1,913	2,012
Fine Gael	Brendan Brady	6.8%	964	985	998	1,000	1,009	1,067	1,083	1,102	1,344	1,763	1,778	1,812	1,823	2,181
Labour	Desmond O'Malley	6.7%	942	944	952	963	988	1,008	1,011	1,013	1,019	1,038	1,209			
Independent	Alice Glenn*	6.4%	909	928	961	966	976	1,048	1,079	1,118	1,158	1,218	1,287	1,313	1,320	
Green	Dermot Hamilton	6.4%	900	909	960	966	978	1,044	1,069	1,092	1,122	1,166	1,288	1,343	1,358	1,705
Sinn Féin	Eileen Murphy	4.9%	710	713	715	721	743	748	759	767	771	773				
Fine Gael	Eddie Nolan	3.7%	518	523	527	530	538	560	571	578	670					
Fine Gael	Tom Farrell	3%	432	438	446	446	452	487	493	499						
Progressive Democrats	Terry Fitzpatrick	2.9%	407	413	417	420	425									
Fianna Fáil	Mary Foley	2.3%	319	375	376	377	440	453								
Fianna Fáil	Peter Lydon	2.1%	294	309	312	313										
Workers' Party	Seán Ó Cionnaith	1.9%	273	274	280											
Independent	Brian Gormley	0.7%	105	106												
Independent	Eamon Murphy	0.6%	74	74												
Electorate: 33,237 Valid: 14,164 (42.6%) Spoilt: 144 Quota: 2,361 Turnout: 14,308 (43.1%)

=== Finglas ===
Finglas - 4 seats
Party	Candidate	FPv%	Count												
Party	Candidate	FPv%	1	2	3	4	5	6	7	8	9	10	11	12	13
Fianna Fáil	Pat Carey*	23.1%	2,774												
Fine Gael	Mary Flaherty TD*	11.3%	1,359	1,393	1,399	1,408	1,471	1,492	1,542	1,588	1,604	1,689	1,741	1,887	2,237
Fianna Fáil	Tony Taaffe	10.2%	1,228	1,312	1,318	1,323	1,332	1,344	1,377	1,446	1,462	1,506	1,616	2,147	2,393
Labour	Bill Tormey	9.1%	1,090	1,113	1,115	1,118	1,129	1,152	1,167	1,181	1,208	1,306	1,444	1,513	1,808
Progressive Democrats	Barney Rock	7.8%	940	959	963	968	988	1,015	1,045	1,075	1,094	1,188	1,301	1,423	
Sinn Féin	Harry Fleming	7.7%	921	942	945	954	955	962	967	983	997	1,032			
Workers' Party	Lucia O'Neill	7.3%	880	896	897	908	915	921	933	941	1,295	1,459	1,655	1,758	1,889
Fianna Fáil	Pat Grant	7.1%	852	923	930	936	938	949	991	1,117	1,133	1,169	1,266		
Green	Aidan Meagher	4.6%	550	559	562	569	576	595	648	654	680				
Workers' Party	Samuel Jordan	3.9%	465	477	482	490	491	501	509	518					
Independent	Lily Fisher	2.1%	258	263	270	276	279	296							
Fianna Fáil	Noel Cloak	2.1%	251	317	330	332	333	338	356						
Independent	Gerard Doolan	1.2%	147	150	165	182	183								
Fine Gael	Miriam Wilson	1.1%	127	129	130	131									
Independent	Billy Keegan	0.7%	83	87	90										
Independent	Brendan Atkinson	0.4%	45	46											
Independent	Frank Clarke	0.3%	32	35											
Electorate: 25,496 Valid: 12,002 (47.1%) Spoilt: 125 Quota: 2,401 Turnout: 12,127 (47.6%)

=== North Inner City ===
North Inner City - 5 seats
Party	Candidate	FPv%	Count								
Party	Candidate	FPv%	1	2	3	4	5	6	7	8	9
Independent	Tony Gregory TD*	32.2%	4,094								
Fianna Fáil	Tony Kett*	12.2%	1,545	1,708	1,709	1,727	1,751	1,806	2,136		
Sinn Féin	Christy Burke*	11.3%	1,437	1,870	1,881	1,909	1,953	2,015	2,116	2,189	
Fianna Fáil	Tom Stafford	9.1%	1,153	1,329	1,341	1,352	1,392	1,455	1,585	1,657	1,812
Labour	Joe Costello	8.7%	1,103	1,451	1,462	1,483	1,526	1,622	1,675	1,899	2,246
Workers' Party	Mike Jennings	5.6%	711	949	957	972	1,001	1,039	1,079	1,248	1,353
Fine Gael	Deirdre Healy	4.7%	603	702	711	864	880	941	964	1,063	
Fianna Fáil	Ernie Beggs	4.7%	593	681	684	694	701	759			
Green	Patricia McKenna	3.9%	499	643	660	671	756	806	830		
Progressive Democrats	Tom Allen	3.1%	396	497	502	509	561				
Independent	Tony Lowth	2%	257	357	384	392					
Fine Gael	Dave Kearney	2%	253	290	292						
Independent	Erick Dillon	0.6%	71	118							
Electorate: 28,917 Valid: 12,715 (44%) Spoilt: 171 Quota: 2,120 Turnout: 12,886 (44.6%)

=== Pembroke ===
Pembroke - 4 seats
Party	Candidate	FPv%	Count											
Party	Candidate	FPv%	1	2	3	4	5	6	7	8	9	10	11	12
Independent	Senator Carmencita Hederman*	23%	3,126											
Fianna Fáil	Senator Eoin Ryan Jnr*	13.1%	1,776	1,809	1,812	1,832	1,855	2,088	2,162	2,198	3,114			
Fine Gael	Joe Doyle TD*	12.3%	1,673	1,744	1,752	1,754	1,766	1,808	1,871	2,450	2,536	2,662	3,081	
Labour	Dermot Lacey	10.9%	1,478	1,513	1,519	1,544	1,564	1,586	1,834	1,886	1,937	1,982	2,159	2,287
Green	Claire Wheeler	7.8%	1,060	1,136	1,153	1,238	1,264	1,295	1,431	1,491	1,541	1,655	2,179	2,324
Progressive Democrats	Jeananne Crowley	7.7%	1,045	1,130	1,137	1,142	1,152	1,203	1,235	1,331	1,366	1,451		
Fianna Fáil	Ciaran O'Loughlin	6.3%	857	870	874	894	903	1,189	1,209	1,239				
Fine Gael	William Egan	6%	814	853	853	855	858	878	900					
Fianna Fáil	Kathryn Byrne	5.1%	687	710	714	726	730							
Workers' Party	Tom Crilly	3.6%	486	495	497	512	736	754						
Workers' Party	Angie Murphy	2.4%	321	327	329	339								
Sinn Féin	Aengus O Snodaigh	1.6%	220	222	222									
Independent	Jim Merriman	0.3%	42	58										
Electorate: 33,502 Valid: 13,585 (40.5%) Spoilt: 112 Quota: 2,718 Turnout: 13,697 (40.9%)

=== Rathmines ===
Rathmines - 4 seats
Party	Candidate	FPv%	Count								
Party	Candidate	FPv%	1	2	3	4	5	6	7	8	9
Fianna Fáil	Michael Donnelly*	17.9%	1,985	1,994	1,996	2,036	2,158	2,209	2,262		
Progressive Democrats	Liz O'Donnell	14.7%	1,635	1,641	1,650	1,671	1,695	1,723	1,797	1,890	2,154
Green	John Gormley	11.7%	1,302	1,312	1,356	1,427	1,435	1,457	1,511	1,801	1,974
Labour	Mary Freehill	10.7%	1,188	1,194	1,213	1,261	1,268	1,301	1,376	1,942	2,082
Workers' Party	Jim Allen	10%	1,113	1,116	1,130	1,173	1,182	1,211	1,242		
Fianna Fáil	Mary Hanafin*	9.7%	1,083	1,086	1,090	1,097	1,225	1,249	1,282	1,381	
Fine Gael	Senator Maurice Manning*	7%	777	777	778	788	791	999	1,559	1,605	1,742
Fine Gael	Terry Cosgrave	6.8%	757	760	764	784	787	901			
Fine Gael	Michael McShane*	4.6%	507	508	509	518	522				
Fianna Fáil	Derek Mooney	2.8%	309	312	312	317					
Independent	Padraig Chambers	2.3%	256	283	304						
Independent	Mick Canning	1.1%	118	122							
Independent	Harry Richards	0.73%	81								
Electorate: 30,397 Valid: 11,111 (36.6%) Spoilt: 103 Quota: 2,223 Turnout: 11,214 (36.9%)

=== South Inner City ===
South Inner City - 5 seats
Party	Candidate	FPv%	Count								
Party	Candidate	FPv%	1	2	3	4	5	6	7	8	9
Fianna Fáil	Michael Mulcahy*	11.5%	1,223	1,224	1,228	1,250	1,387	1,430	1,488	1,602	1,688
Labour	Ruairi Quinn TD	11.4%	1,215	1,216	1,221	1,261	1,276	1,369	1,456	1,595	1,880
Independent	Brendan Lynch*	10.9%	1,165	1,171	1,181	1,208	1,221	1,230	1,405	1,518	1,663
Green	Ciarán Cuffe	10.7%	1,141	1,143	1,150	1,186	1,197	1,227	1,350	1,550	1,789
Fianna Fáil	Mary Mooney*	10.3%	1,102	1,104	1,106	1,136	1,355	1,398	1,523	1,616	1,717
Sinn Féin	Micheal O Muireagain	8.5%	909	909	915	918	924	966	1,042		
Fine Gael	Peter Burke*	7.6%	812	812	817	1,024	1,030	1,050	1,102	1,136	
Independent	John Gallagher*	7.4%	788	789	800	808	820	823			
Workers' Party	Brian O'Connor	7.3%	778	779	781	789	792	1,112	1,194	1,359	1,422
Workers' Party	Andrew Smith*	5.6%	600	601	604	610	611				
Fianna Fáil	Gerry Dunne	4%	429	432	434	444					
Fine Gael	Bernadette Gray	3.7%	396	396	405						
Independent	Christy Doyle	0.7%	71	73							
Independent	Jim Merriman	0.2%	22								
Electorate: 28,161 Valid: 10,651 (37.8%) Spoilt: 204 Quota: 1,776 Turnout: 10,855 (38.6%)
