= Seán Moore (Irish politician) =

Irish politician (1913–1986)

Minister of State
- 1979–1981: Government Chief Whip
- 1979–1981: Defence

Teachta Dála
- In office April 1965 – February 1982
- Constituency: Dublin South-East

Lord Mayor of Dublin
- In office 1963–1964
- Preceded by: James O'Keeffe
- Succeeded by: John McCann

Personal details
- Born: 19 May 1913 Irishtown, Dublin, Ireland
- Died: 1 October 1986 (aged 73) Dublin, Ireland
- Party: Fianna Fáil
- Education: University College Dublin
- Occupation: Businessman

Seán Moore (19 May 1913 – 1 October 1986) was an Irish Fianna Fáil politician.

Moore was born in Dublin in 1913 and grew up in Irishtown, Dublin. He was educated at the Vocational School in Ringsend and University College Dublin where he received a diploma in Social and Economic Science. He worked as an official with the Alliance and Dublin Consumers' Gas Company before becoming involved in politics. Moore first held political office in 1950 when he was elected to Dublin City Council, a position he would hold until 1979. He served as Lord Mayor of Dublin from 1963 to 1964. Moore was elected to Dáil Éireann as a Fianna Fáil Teachta Dála (TD) on his third attempt at the 1965 general election, representing the Dublin South-East constituency in the 18th Dáil.

In 1979 Charles Haughey came to power and Moore became Government Chief Whip. His health declined during this period, so much so that the Assistant Chief Whip, Bertie Ahern, was doing most of Moore's work. He served in that position until Fianna Fáil lost power at the 1981 general election and remained in the Dáil until he lost his seat at the February 1982 general election. He fought one further general election in November 1982 but failed to be elected, and subsequently retired from politics.

Seán Moore Road and Seán Moore Park near Irishtown are named after him.

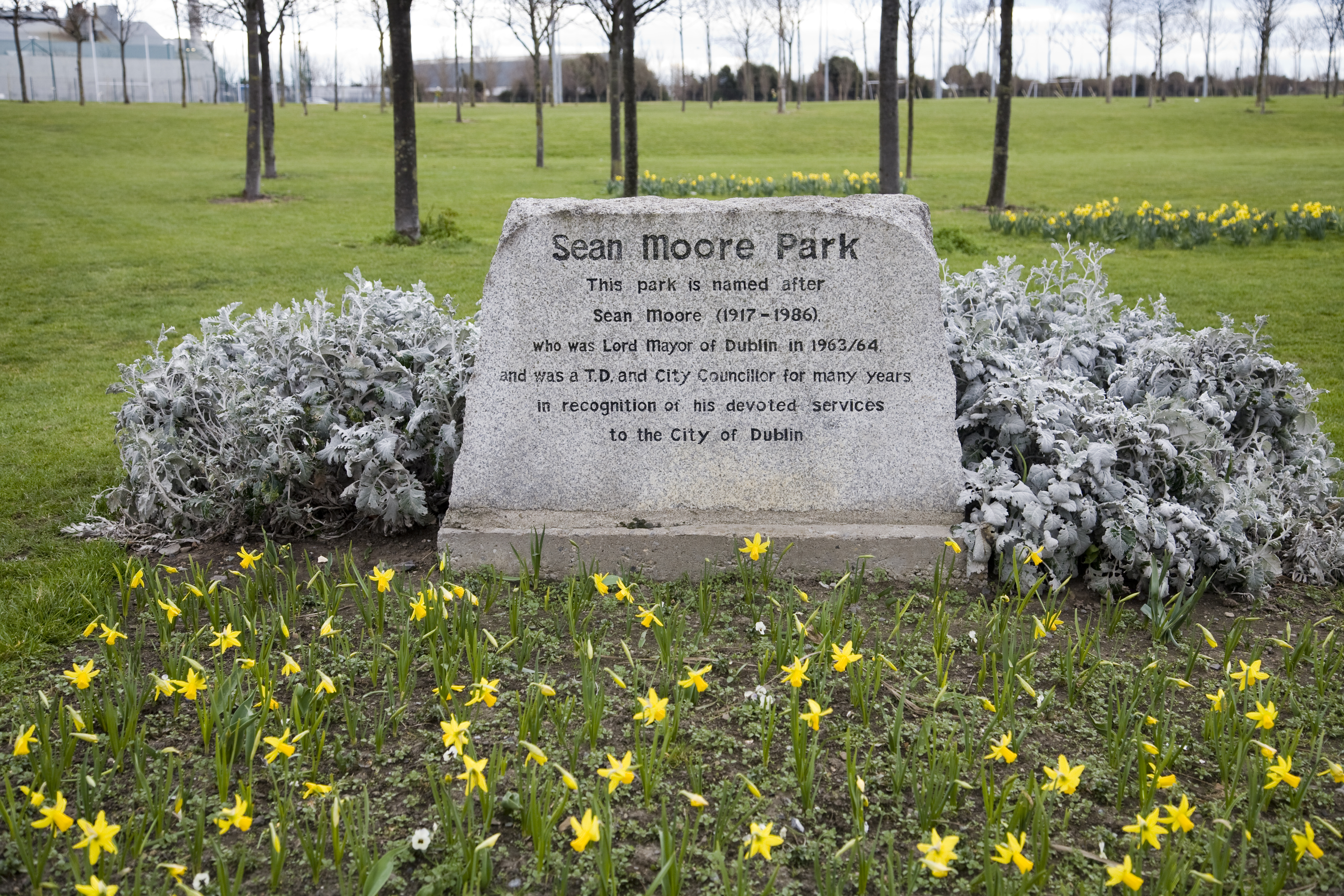
Seán Moore Park commemoration stone

Civic offices
Preceded by James O'Keeffe	Lord Mayor of Dublin; 1963–1964	Succeeded by John McCann
Political offices
Preceded by Michael Woods	Government Chief Whip; 1979–1981	Succeeded by Gerry L'Estrange
Preceded by Michael Woods	Minister of State at the Department of Defence; 1979–1981	Succeeded by Gerry L'Estrange

Dáil	Election	Deputy (Party)	Deputy (Party)	Deputy (Party)	Deputy (Party)
13th	1948	John A. Costello (FG)	Seán MacEntee (FF)	Noël Browne (CnaP)	3 seats 1948–1981
14th	1951	John A. Costello (FG)	Seán MacEntee (FF)	Noël Browne (Ind.)	3 seats 1948–1981
15th	1954	John A. Costello (FG)	Seán MacEntee (FF)	John O'Donovan (FG)	3 seats 1948–1981
16th	1957	John A. Costello (FG)	Seán MacEntee (FF)	Noël Browne (Ind.)	3 seats 1948–1981
17th	1961	John A. Costello (FG)	Seán MacEntee (FF)	Noël Browne (NPD)	3 seats 1948–1981
18th	1965	John A. Costello (FG)	Seán MacEntee (FF)	Seán Moore (FF)	3 seats 1948–1981
19th	1969	Garret FitzGerald (FG)	Noël Browne (Lab)	Seán Moore (FF)	3 seats 1948–1981
20th	1973	Garret FitzGerald (FG)	Fergus O'Brien (FG)	Seán Moore (FF)	3 seats 1948–1981
21st	1977	Garret FitzGerald (FG)	Ruairi Quinn (Lab)	Seán Moore (FF)	3 seats 1948–1981
22nd	1981	Garret FitzGerald (FG)	Gerard Brady (FF)	Seán Moore (FF)	Richie Ryan (FG)
23rd	1982 (Feb)	Garret FitzGerald (FG)	Gerard Brady (FF)	Ruairi Quinn (Lab)	Alexis FitzGerald Jnr (FG)
24th	1982 (Nov)	Garret FitzGerald (FG)	Gerard Brady (FF)	Ruairi Quinn (Lab)	Joe Doyle (FG)
25th	1987	Garret FitzGerald (FG)	Gerard Brady (FF)	Ruairi Quinn (Lab)	Michael McDowell (PDs)
26th	1989	Garret FitzGerald (FG)	Gerard Brady (FF)	Ruairi Quinn (Lab)	Joe Doyle (FG)
27th	1992	Frances Fitzgerald (FG)	Eoin Ryan Jnr (FF)	Ruairi Quinn (Lab)	Michael McDowell (PDs)
28th	1997	Frances Fitzgerald (FG)	Eoin Ryan Jnr (FF)	Ruairi Quinn (Lab)	John Gormley (GP)
29th	2002	Michael McDowell (PDs)	Eoin Ryan Jnr (FF)	Ruairi Quinn (Lab)	John Gormley (GP)
30th	2007	Lucinda Creighton (FG)	Chris Andrews (FF)	Ruairi Quinn (Lab)	John Gormley (GP)
31st	2011	Lucinda Creighton (FG)	Eoghan Murphy (FG)	Ruairi Quinn (Lab)	Kevin Humphreys (Lab)
32nd	2016	Constituency abolished. See Dublin Bay South.			
