= Dublin South-East =

Dáil constituency (1948–2016)

- Former Dáil constituency
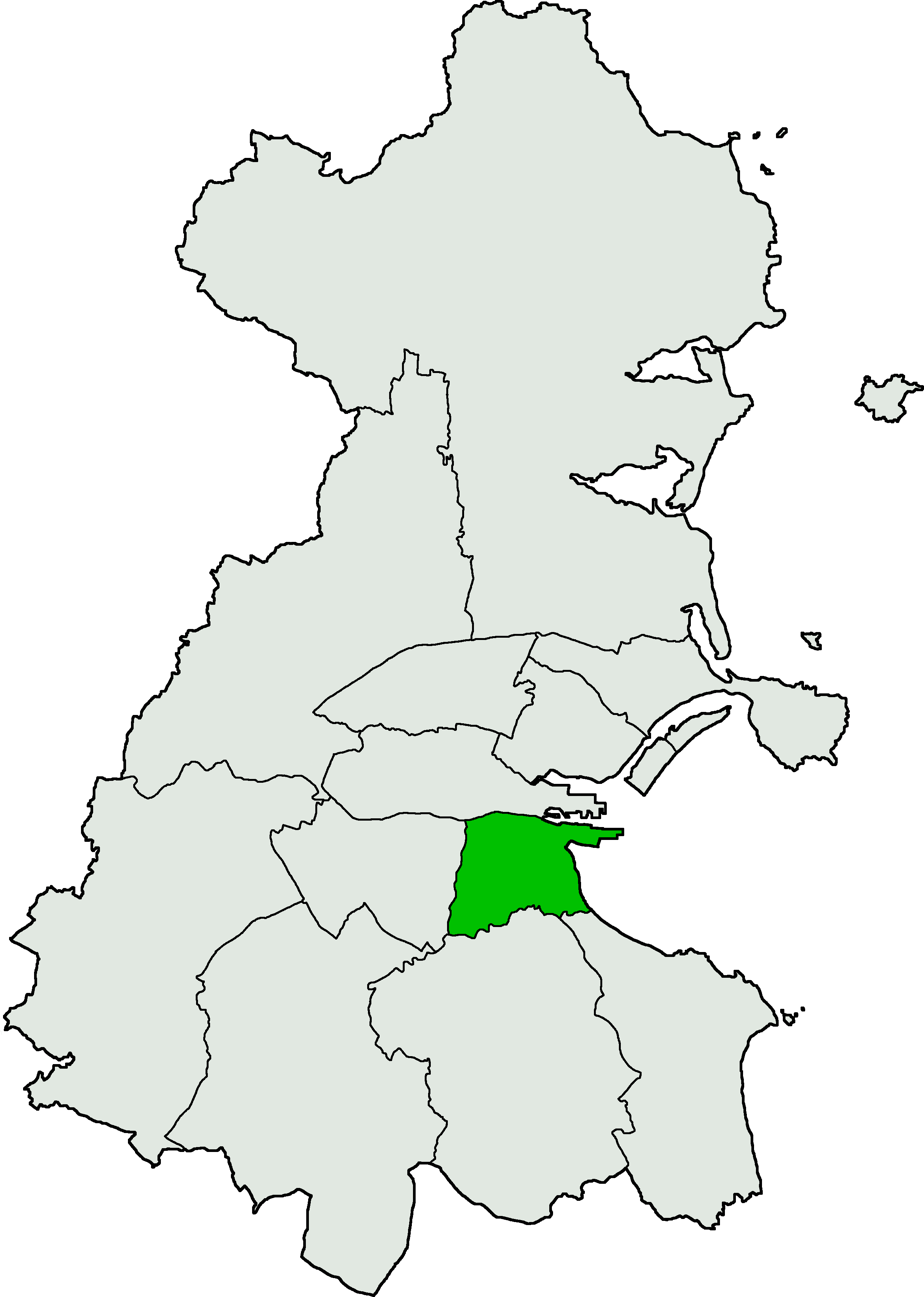
- Location of Dublin South-East within County Dublin

Former constituency
- Created: 1948
- Abolished: 2016
- Seats: 3 (1948–1981); 4 (1981–2016)
- Local government area: Dublin City
- Created from: Dublin Townships
- Replaced by: Dublin Bay South

Dublin South-East was a parliamentary constituency represented in Dáil Éireann, the lower house of the Irish parliament or Oireachtas, from 1948 to 2016. The method of election was proportional representation by means of the single transferable vote (PR-STV).

== Boundaries ==
The constituency was created under the Electoral (Amendment) Act 1947 and first used at the 1948 general election. It substantially succeeded the previous constituency of Dublin Townships. It included areas such as Ballsbridge, Donnybrook, Harolds Cross, Sandymount, Ranelagh, Rathmines, Ringsend and the central business district of the city (including Trinity College Dublin and St Stephen's Green).

Changes to the Dublin South-East constituency 1948–2016
Years	TDs	Boundaries	Notes
1948–1961	3	In the county borough of Dublin, the Pembroke East, Pembroke West and Rathmines East Wards, the portion of the Rathfarnham Ward lying to the east of a line drawn along Dartry Road and the portion of the Rathmines West Ward lying to the east of a line drawn as follows: Commencing at a point in the ward boundary due north of the middle of Rathmines Road Lower, thence southerly along Rathmines Road Lower and Rathmines Road Upper to the ward boundary.	Created from Dublin Townships and Dublin South.
1961–1969	3	In the county borough of Dublin, the Pembroke East, Pembroke West, Rathfarnham, Rathfarnham South and Rathmines East wards.	Transfer of balance of the Rathfarnham Ward from Dublin South-West; transfer of the balance of Rathmines West Ward to Dublin South-West.
1969–1977	3	In the county borough of Dublin, the Mansion House, Pembroke East, Pembroke West, St. Kevin's and South Dock wards; that part of Rathmines East ward which is not included in the constituency of Dublin South-Central; and that part of Royal Exchange ward which is not included in the constituency of Dublin Central.	Transfer of Mansion House, St. Kevin's, South Dock and part of Royal Exchange from Dublin South-Central; Transfer of Rathfarnham and part of Rathmines East ward to Dublin South-Central.
1977–1981	3	The following wards in the county borough of Dublin Pembroke East A, Pembroke East B, Pembroke East C, Pembroke East D, Pembroke East E, Pembroke West A, Pembroke West B, Pembroke West C, Rathmines East A, Rathmines East B, Rathmines East C, Rathmines East D, Rathmines West C, South Dock; and in County Dublin, the DED of Dundrum Number One.	
1981–1987	4	In the county borough of Dublin, the wards of Mansion House A, Mansion House B, Pembroke East A, Pembroke East B, Pembroke East C, Pembroke East E, Pembroke West A, Pembroke West B, Pembroke West C, Rathfarnham A, Rathmines East A, Rathmines East B, Rathmines East C, Rathmines East D, Rathmines West A, Rathmines West B, Rathmines West C, Rathmines West D, Rathmines West E, Rathmines West F, Royal Exchange A, Royal Exchange B, Saint Kevin's, South Dock, Wood Quay A, Wood Quay B.	Transfer of Mansion House A and B, Royal Exchange A, Royal Exchange B, Saint Kevin's, South Dock, Wood Quay A, Wood Quay B from Dublin South-Central; transfer from Dublin Rathmines West of Rathfarnham A, Rathmines West A, Rathmines West B, Rathmines West D, Rathmines West E transfer of Pembroke East D to Dublin South.
1992–1997	4	In the county borough of Dublin, the wards of Mansion House A, Mansion House B, Merchants Quay A, Merchants Quay B, Merchants Quay C, Merchants Quay D, Merchants Quay E, Pembroke East A, Pembroke East B, Pembroke East C, Pembroke East E, Pembroke West A, Pembroke West B, Pembroke West C, Rathfarnham, Rathmines East A, Rathmines East B, Rathmines East C, Rathmines East D, Rathmines West A, Rathmines West B, Rathmines West C, Rathmines West D, Rathmines West E, Rathmines West F, Royal Exchange A, Royal Exchange B, St. Kevin's, South Dock, Ushers B, Wood Quay A, Wood Quay B; and the part of the ward of Ushers C, which is not in the constituency of Dublin South-Central.	Transfer of the south inner city area extending generally from the Grand Canal and Donore Avenue to the Liffey (Merchant's Quay A to E) from Dublin South-Central.
1997–2002	4	In the city of Dublin, the electoral divisions of Mansion House A, Mansion House B, Merchants Quay A, Pembroke East A, Pembroke East B, Pembroke East C, Pembroke East D, Pembroke East E, Pembroke West A, Pembroke West B, Pembroke West C, Rathfarnham, Rathmines East A, Rathmines East B, Rathmines East C, Rathmines East D, Rathmines West A, Rathmines West B, Rathmines West C, Rathmines West D, Rathmines West E, Rathmines West F, Royal Exchange A, Royal Exchange B, St. Kevin's, South Dock, Wood Quay A, Wood Quay B; and in Dún Laoghaire–Rathdown, the electoral divisions of Blackrock-Glenomena, Clonskeagh-Belfield; and that part of the electoral division of Blackrock-Booterstown situated north of a line drawn as follows— commencing at the southernmost junction of the western boundary of the district electoral division with the rear boundary of number 36 Trimleston Gardens, thence commencing in a north-easterly direction and proceeding along the said rear boundary and the rear boundaries of numbers 35 to 1 Trimleston Gardens to the junction of the rear boundary of number 1 Trimleston Gardens with the rear boundary of number 14 Trimleston Avenue, thence commencing in a north-easterly direction and proceeding along the rear boundaries of numbers 14 to 1 Trimleston Avenue to the junction of the rear boundary of number 1 Trimleston Avenue with the eastern boundary of the said number 1 Trimleston Avenue, thence in a south-easterly direction along the imaginary south-easterly projection of the said eastern boundary to its junction with the northern boundary of number 9 Rock Road, thence commencing in a north-easterly direction and proceeding along the said boundary and its imaginary easterly projection to its junction with the eastern boundary of the electoral division.	Transfer of Merchants Quay B, Merchants Quay C, Merchants Quay D, Merchants Quay E to Dublin South-Central; transfer from Dún Laoghaire of Blackrock-Glenomena, Clonskeagh-Belfield and part of Blackrock-Booterstown; transfer of Pembroke East D from Dublin South.
2002–2016	4	In the city of Dublin, the electoral divisions of Mansion House A, Mansion House B, Pembroke East A, Pembroke East B, Pembroke East C, Pembroke East D, Pembroke East E, Pembroke West A, Pembroke West B, Pembroke West C, Rathfarnham, Rathmines East A, Rathmines East B, Rathmines East C, Rathmines East D, Rathmines West A, Rathmines West B, Rathmines West C, Rathmines West D, Rathmines West E, Rathmines West F, Royal Exchange A, Royal Exchange B, St. Kevin's, South Dock, Wood Quay A, Wood Quay B.	Transfer to Dublin South-Central of population to complete a boundary between the constituencies running from the Liffey at Winetavern Street; transfer to Dún Laoghaire.
2016	—	Constituency abolished	Area included in new constituency of Dublin Bay South, with the addition of Kimmage C, and Terenure A, B, C and D transferred from Dublin South-Central

== Constituency profile ==
By geographical area, Dublin South-East was the smallest constituency in the country. It had a diverse socio-economic profile and a large transient population which was reflected in the turnout: the constituency had one of the lowest turnouts in the country in 2007 and 2011.

Notable Dublin South-East TDs include former Taoiseach John A. Costello and Garret FitzGerald, the former leader of the Progressive Democrats Michael McDowell, maverick left-wing politician Noël Browne and former Minister for Finance Ruairi Quinn (who was its longest-serving TD, first elected in 1977 and serving continuously from February 1982 until his retirement in 2016). Mary McAleese, a former president of Ireland, unsuccessfully contested the constituency for Fianna Fáil in 1987.

The "Rumble in Ranelagh" is a term used by Irish journalists to describe an open argument that took place between candidates Michael McDowell and John Gormley in Ranelagh, while canvassing in the 2007 general election. Gormley twice defeated McDowell to take the last seat, in 1997 and again in 2007, both times by relatively small margins. The 1997 result led to a mammoth recount, the longest in Irish political history, before McDowell conceded defeat.

== TDs ==
Teachtaí Dála (TDs) for Dublin South-East 1948–2016
Key to parties: CnaP = Clann na Poblachta; FF = Fianna Fáil; FG = Fine Gael; GP = Green; Ind. = Independent; Lab = Labour; NPD = National Progressive Democrats; PDs = Progressive Democrats
Dáil	Election	Deputy (Party)	Deputy (Party)	Deputy (Party)	Deputy (Party)
13th	1948	John A. Costello (FG)	Seán MacEntee (FF)	Noël Browne (CnaP)	3 seats 1948–1981
14th	1951	John A. Costello (FG)	Seán MacEntee (FF)	Noël Browne (Ind.)	3 seats 1948–1981
15th	1954	John A. Costello (FG)	Seán MacEntee (FF)	John O'Donovan (FG)	3 seats 1948–1981
16th	1957	John A. Costello (FG)	Seán MacEntee (FF)	Noël Browne (Ind.)	3 seats 1948–1981
17th	1961	John A. Costello (FG)	Seán MacEntee (FF)	Noël Browne (NPD)	3 seats 1948–1981
18th	1965	John A. Costello (FG)	Seán MacEntee (FF)	Seán Moore (FF)	3 seats 1948–1981
19th	1969	Garret FitzGerald (FG)	Noël Browne (Lab)	Seán Moore (FF)	3 seats 1948–1981
20th	1973	Garret FitzGerald (FG)	Fergus O'Brien (FG)	Seán Moore (FF)	3 seats 1948–1981
21st	1977	Garret FitzGerald (FG)	Ruairi Quinn (Lab)	Seán Moore (FF)	3 seats 1948–1981
22nd	1981	Garret FitzGerald (FG)	Gerard Brady (FF)	Seán Moore (FF)	Richie Ryan (FG)
23rd	1982 (Feb)	Garret FitzGerald (FG)	Gerard Brady (FF)	Ruairi Quinn (Lab)	Alexis FitzGerald Jnr (FG)
24th	1982 (Nov)	Garret FitzGerald (FG)	Gerard Brady (FF)	Ruairi Quinn (Lab)	Joe Doyle (FG)
25th	1987	Garret FitzGerald (FG)	Gerard Brady (FF)	Ruairi Quinn (Lab)	Michael McDowell (PDs)
26th	1989	Garret FitzGerald (FG)	Gerard Brady (FF)	Ruairi Quinn (Lab)	Joe Doyle (FG)
27th	1992	Frances Fitzgerald (FG)	Eoin Ryan Jnr (FF)	Ruairi Quinn (Lab)	Michael McDowell (PDs)
28th	1997	Frances Fitzgerald (FG)	Eoin Ryan Jnr (FF)	Ruairi Quinn (Lab)	John Gormley (GP)
29th	2002	Michael McDowell (PDs)	Eoin Ryan Jnr (FF)	Ruairi Quinn (Lab)	John Gormley (GP)
30th	2007	Lucinda Creighton (FG)	Chris Andrews (FF)	Ruairi Quinn (Lab)	John Gormley (GP)
31st	2011	Lucinda Creighton (FG)	Eoghan Murphy (FG)	Ruairi Quinn (Lab)	Kevin Humphreys (Lab)
32nd	2016	Constituency abolished. See Dublin Bay South.			

Note: The columns in this table are used only for presentational purposes, and no significance should be attached to the order of columns. For details of the order in which seats were won at each election, see the detailed results of that election.

== Elections ==
*: Outgoing TD

=== 2011 general election ===
2011 general election: Dublin South-East
Party	Candidate	FPv%	Count									
Party	Candidate	FPv%	1	2	3	4	5	6	7	8	9	10
Fine Gael	Lucinda Creighton	19.0	6,619	6,694	6,801	6,855	6,969	7,428				
Fine Gael	Eoghan Murphy	16.6	5,783	5,843	5,891	5,938	6,136	6,534	6,636	6,915	8,356	
Labour	Ruairi Quinn	15.5	5,407	5,562	5,800	6,147	6,600	7,555				
Fianna Fáil	Chris Andrews	11.2	3,922	3,981	4,059	4,160	4,248	4,498	4,545	4,594	4,950	5,193
Labour	Kevin Humphreys	9.9	3,450	3,568	3,764	4,059	4,294	4,674	5,019	5,057	5,894	6,421
Green	John Gormley	6.8	2,370	2,435	2,547	2,659	2,908					
Independent	Paul Sommerville	6.7	2,343	2,492	2,621	2,815	3,196	3,457	3,534	3,566		
Independent	Dylan Haskins	4.0	1,383	1,492	1,754	1,928						
Sinn Féin	Ruadhán Mac Aodháin	3.6	1,272	1,405	1,549							
Independent	Mannix Flynn	3.6	1,248	1,403								
People Before Profit	Annette Mooney (Note: Mooney campaigned as a member of the United Left Alliance.)	1.8	629									
Independent	Hugh Sheehy	0.6	195									
Independent	James Coyle	0.5	164									
Independent	Noel Watson	0.3	89									
Independent	John Keigher	0.1	27									
Fís Nua	Peadar Ó Ceallaigh (Note: Although Fís Nua was registered as a political party on 4 February 2011, the party's name did not appear on the ballot, as the Register of Political Parties in use was that in force on 1 February 2011, when the writ for the general election was issued.)	0.1	18									
Electorate: 58,217 Valid: 34,919 Spoilt: 327 (0.9%) Quota: 6,984 Turnout: 35,246 (60.5%)

=== 2007 general election ===
2007 general election: Dublin South-East
Party	Candidate	FPv%	Count				
Party	Candidate	FPv%	1	2	3	4	5
Fianna Fáil	Chris Andrews	19.5	6,600	6,766	7,120		
Fine Gael	Lucinda Creighton	18.6	6,311	6,477	6,595	6,619	6,925
Labour	Ruairi Quinn	16.6	5,636	5,947	6,252	6,303	6,861
Green	John Gormley	13.8	4,685	5,105	5,716	5,796	6,395
Progressive Democrats	Michael McDowell	13.2	4,450	4,566	4,601	4,614	6,091
Fianna Fáil	Jim O'Callaghan	9.2	3,120	3,198	3,310	3,450	
Sinn Féin	Daithí Doolan	4.7	1,599	1,716			
Independent	Esther Uzell	1.8	603				
People Before Profit	Rory Hearne	1.8	591				
Independent	Eoin Tierney	0.3	102				
Independent	Noel Ivory	0.3	84				
Independent	Peter O'Sullivan	0.1	34				
Independent	Noel O'Gara	0.1	27				
Electorate: 63,468 Valid: 33,842 Spoilt: 292 (0.9%) Quota: 6,769 Turnout: 34,134 (53.8%)

=== 2002 general election ===
2002 general election: Dublin South-East
Party	Candidate	FPv%	Count					
Party	Candidate	FPv%	1	2	3	4	5	6
Progressive Democrats	Michael McDowell	18.8	6,093	6,121	6,418	6,509		
Fianna Fáil	Eoin Ryan	16.4	5,318	5,372	5,408	5,823	8,642	
Green	John Gormley	16.2	5,264	5,483	5,793	6,844		
Labour	Ruairi Quinn	12.4	4,032	4,127	4,318	4,674	5,151	5,860
Fianna Fáil	Chris Andrews	10.6	3,449	3,473	3,500	3,824		
Fine Gael	Frances Fitzgerald	10.3	3,337	3,358	4,371	4,443	4,668	5,255
Sinn Féin	Daithí Doolan	7.4	2,398	2,555	2,578			
Fine Gael	Colm Mac Eochaidh	5.8	1,873	1,905				
Socialist Workers	Shay Ryan	0.9	286					
Workers' Party	Tom Crilly	0.9	284					
Independent	Norman Gray	0.3	99					
Electorate: 59,896 Valid: 32,433 Spoilt: 287 (0.9%) Quota: 6,487 Turnout: 32,720 (54.6%)

=== 1997 general election ===
1997 general election: Dublin South-East
Party	Candidate	FPv%	Count										
Party	Candidate	FPv%	1	2	3	4	5	6	7	8	9	10	11
Fianna Fáil	Eoin Ryan	17.7	6,494	6,496	6,511	6,545	6,652	6,902	9,377				
Labour	Ruairi Quinn	16.7	6,113	6,116	6,139	6,231	6,406	6,448	6,564	6,771	7,252	9,043	
Fine Gael	Frances Fitzgerald	15.0	5,501	5,502	5,524	5,547	5,569	5,652	5,703	5,753	9,567		
Fine Gael	Joe Doyle	12.4	4,541	4,541	4,558	4,585	4,667	4,799	4,835	4,886			
Green	John Gormley	11.7	4,296	4,298	4,340	4,598	4,904	5,100	5,223	5,493	5,728	5,994	6,801
Progressive Democrats	Michael McDowell	10.9	4,022	4,024	4,047	4,069	4,095	4,318	4,595	6,059	6,275	6,450	6,774
Fianna Fáil	Noel Whelan	8.1	2,962	2,963	2,980	2,999	3,032	3,158					
National Party	Márie Kirrane	3.2	1,169	1,170	1,177	1,202	1,233						
Workers' Party	Tom Crilly	1.9	694	695	707	848							
Socialist Workers	Peadar O'Grady	1.1	410	413	425								
Natural Law	Mary Daly	0.6	231	234	249								
Independent	Joe Guerin	0.3	110	115									
Independent	William D. J. Gorman	0.3	99	101									
Independent	John Harpur	0.1	29										
Electorate: 64,215 Valid: 36,671 Spoilt: 361 (1.0%) Quota: 7,335 Turnout: 37,032 (57.7%)

=== 1992 general election ===
1992 general election: Dublin South-East
Party	Candidate	FPv%	Count											
Party	Candidate	FPv%	1	2	3	4	5	6	7	8	9	10	11	12
Labour	Ruairi Quinn	25.8	10,381											
Fianna Fáil	Eoin Ryan	11.3	4,566	4,719	4,721	4,747	4,772	4,854	4,941	4,982	5,823	6,214	6,533	6,695
Progressive Democrats	Michael McDowell	11.2	4,504	4,812	4,814	4,837	4,868	4,912	4,946	5,100	5,188	5,898	6,403	7,752
Fine Gael	Joe Doyle	11.0	4,438	4,707	4,711	4,726	4,784	4,837	4,893	4,997	5,095	5,477		
Fine Gael	Frances Fitzgerald	10.8	4,332	4,735	4,738	4,756	4,786	4,809	4,829	5,007	5,127	6,038	9,718	
Fianna Fáil	Gerard Brady	10.5	4,238	4,317	4,321	4,332	4,381	4,412	4,481	4,560	5,485	5,792	6,070	6,226
Green	John Gormley	6.2	2,476	2,831	2,847	2,899	3,010	3,192	3,524	4,224	4,374			
Fianna Fáil	Mary Mooney	5.3	2,123	2,200	2,203	2,209	2,326	2,369	2,461	2,511				
Democratic Left	Jim Allen	2.2	874	1,242	1,245	1,260	1,318	1,475	1,595					
Sinn Féin	Micheál Ó'Muireagáin	2.1	851	883	884	897	961	1,062						
Independent	John Gallagher	1.5	620	671	673	705								
Workers' Party	Andy Smith	1.4	573	782	785	808	888							
Independent	Ian Murray	0.5	194	209	255									
Independent	Thomas Joseph Mullins	0.2	84	95										
Electorate: 69,582 Valid: 40,254 Spoilt: 958 (2.3%) Quota: 8,051 Turnout: 41,212 (59.2%)

=== 1989 general election ===
1989 general election: Dublin South-East
Party	Candidate	FPv%	Count								
Party	Candidate	FPv%	1	2	3	4	5	6	7	8	9
Fianna Fáil	Gerard Brady	18.1	5,959	5,964	5,969	6,046	7,073				
Fine Gael	Joe Doyle	15.9	5,235	5,244	5,257	5,387	5,433	5,440	6,421	6,946	
Labour	Ruairi Quinn	12.2	4,014	4,021	4,060	4,784	4,890	4,905	5,270	7,096	
Fine Gael	Garret FitzGerald	11.8	3,865	3,880	3,892	3,969	4,049	4,060	5,212	5,938	6,323
Green	John Gormley	10.1	3,329	3,334	3,477	3,938	4,000	4,012	4,256		
Fianna Fáil	Eoin Ryan	9.9	3,265	3,269	3,282	3,374	4,249	4,690	4,829	5,348	5,479
Progressive Democrats	Michael McDowell	8.7	2,853	2,863	2,875	2,948	2,988	2,995			
Fianna Fáil	Mary Hanafin	6.8	2,226	2,227	2,231	2,279					
Workers' Party	Tom Crilly	5.5	1,816	1,825	1,843						
Independent	Tonie Walsh	0.8	254	266							
Independent	Patrick J. McDonnell	0.3	81								
Electorate: 58,063 Valid: 32,897 Quota: 6,580 Turnout: 56.6%

=== 1987 general election ===
1987 general election: Dublin South-East
Party	Candidate	FPv%	Count														
Party	Candidate	FPv%	1	2	3	4	5	6	7	8	9	10	11	12	13	14	15
Fine Gael	Garret FitzGerald	21.1	8,068														
Progressive Democrats	Michael McDowell	15.6	5,961	6,035	6,035	6,040	6,049	6,076	6,099	6,283	6,489	6,575	6,745	6,923	6,935	9,772	
Fianna Fáil	Gerard Brady	14.5	5,560	5,565	5,567	5,568	5,575	5,594	5,681	5,693	5,721	6,434	6,662	8,010			
Labour	Ruairi Quinn	9.1	3,480	3,506	3,507	3,516	3,535	3,599	3,671	3,713	4,131	4,235	5,074	5,244	5,260	6,136	7,840
Fine Gael	Joe Doyle	8.7	3,323	3,498	3,499	3,502	3,512	3,541	3,575	4,254	4,383	4,438	4,589	4,656	4,663		
Fianna Fáil	Michael Donnelly	7.4	2,838	2,840	2,843	2,845	2,853	2,875	2,936	2,970	2,973	3,394	3,537	4,694	5,014	5,201	5,353
Fianna Fáil	Mary McAleese	5.9	2,243	2,247	2,247	2,251	2,258	2,267	2,357	2,370	2,457	2,960	3,112				
Fianna Fáil	Eoin Ryan	4.9	1,881	1,883	1,883	1,885	1,887	1,900	1,933	1,937	1,972						
Workers' Party	Andy Smith	3.3	1,250	1,252	1,253	1,254	1,273	1,728	1,924	1,928	2,226	2,315					
Green	Máire Mullarney	2.9	1,094	1,098	1,099	1,120	1,166	1,184	1,332	1,340							
Fine Gael	William Egan	2.3	860	976	976	978	979	985	989								
Sinn Féin	Aengus Ó Snodaigh	2.1	811	811	813	813	823	845									
Workers' Party	Tom Crilly	1.7	660	661	667	668	694										
Independent	Gerry Brennan	0.4	147	148	157	173											
Independent	Barbara Hyland	0.2	65	66	68												
Independent	Patrick Clarke	0.1	29	29													
Electorate: 68,286 Valid: 38,270 Quota: 7,655 Turnout: 56.1%

=== November 1982 general election ===
November 1982 general election: Dublin South-East
Party	Candidate	FPv%	Count										
Party	Candidate	FPv%	1	2	3	4	5	6	7	8	9	10	11
Fine Gael	Garret FitzGerald	22.1	8,803										
Fianna Fáil	Gerard Brady	16.3	6,488	6,502	6,507	6,541	6,554	6,579	7,268	7,295	7,460	7,604	7,791
Labour	Ruairi Quinn	14.8	5,893	5,970	5,986	5,994	6,102	6,261	6,308	6,473	7,691	8,291	
Fine Gael	Joe Doyle	11.5	4,583	4,731	4,735	4,749	4,782	4,797	4,828	5,733	5,878	9,969	
Fianna Fáil	Seán Moore	11.2	4,443	4,453	4,464	4,473	4,488	4,507	5,202	5,229	5,443	5,513	5,645
Fine Gael	Alexis FitzGerald Jnr	9.4	3,744	4,234	4,245	4,255	4,279	4,293	4,308	5,063	5,128		
Workers' Party	Andy Smith	4.6	1,820	1,825	1,827	1,828	1,863	2,004	2,019	2,026			
Fine Gael	John McKenna	4.4	1,764	1,841	1,845	1,848	1,865	1,872	1,889				
Fianna Fáil	Peter Gibson	3.7	1,486	1,491	1,492	1,496	1,509	1,522					
Independent	Liz Noonan	0.9	340	341	348	361	422						
Green	Máire Mullarney	0.8	312	315	327	333							
Independent	William Fitzsimon	0.3	104	104	106								
Independent	Séamus O'Daly	0.2	79	80									
Electorate: 73,048 Valid: 39,859 Quota: 7,972 Turnout: 54.6%

=== February 1982 general election ===
February 1982 general election: Dublin South-East
Party	Candidate	FPv%	Count										
Party	Candidate	FPv%	1	2	3	4	5	6	7	8	9	10	11
Fine Gael	Garret FitzGerald	31.5	12,644										
Fianna Fáil	Gerard Brady	15.3	6,131	6,197	6,202	6,211	6,215	6,261	6,296	6,314	6,522	8,113	
Labour	Ruairi Quinn	13.5	5,402	5,980	5,985	5,995	6,010	6,022	6,085	6,219	7,204	7,313	7,961
Fianna Fáil	Seán Moore	11.6	4,645	4,706	4,712	4,714	4,716	4,724	4,755	4,777	5,003	5,989	6,152
Fine Gael	Alexis FitzGerald Jnr	7.9	3,164	6,048	6,052	6,065	6,071	6,077	6,095	6,117	6,237	6,290	9,270
Fine Gael	Joe Doyle	6.8	2,735	3,648	3,650	3,654	3,660	3,670	3,727	3,742	3,909	3,950	
Fianna Fáil	Michael Donnelly	6.7	2,679	2,710	2,712	2,717	2,717	2,727	2,727	2,739	2,815		
Sinn Féin The Workers' Party	Andy Smith	4.7	1,894	1,935	1,936	1,939	1,954	1,959	1,980	2,120			
Independent	Elizabeth Noonan	0.8	309	315	324	326	363	378	416				
Independent	Desmond Hynes	0.6	222	242	250	255	265	282					
Independent	William Fitzsimon	0.3	125	130	130	132	136						
Independent	Matthew Treacy	0.2	94	95	99	103							
Independent	Séamus O'Daly	0.1	58	62	66								
Independent	Molly Donovan	0.1	49	52									
Electorate: 69,149 Valid: 40,151 Quota: 8,031 Turnout: 66.8%

=== 1981 general election ===
1981 general election: Dublin South-East
Party	Candidate	FPv%	Count								
Party	Candidate	FPv%	1	2	3	4	5	6	7	8	9
Fine Gael	Garret FitzGerald	33.8	13,794								
Fianna Fáil	Gerard Brady	16.7	6,807	6,923	6,994	7,021	7,086	7,271	9,180		
Fianna Fáil	Seán Moore	14.0	5,702	5,814	5,834	5,855	5,918	6,147	7,326	7,605	8,556
Labour	Ruairi Quinn	8.7	3,559	4,026	4,061	4,125	5,358	6,494	6,606	7,171	7,220
Fianna Fáil	Michael Donnelly	7.8	3,193	3,259	3,276	3,296	3,323	3,400			
Fine Gael	Joe Doyle	5.0	2,026	3,521	3,546	3,556	3,649	3,845	3,925		
Sinn Féin The Workers' Party	Andy Smith	4.8	1,969	2,013	2,033	2,136	2,244				
Fine Gael	Richie Ryan	4.2	1,722	4,846	4,863	4,876	4,990	5,128	5,183	7,971	7,987
Labour	Mary Freehill	3.5	1,434	1,616	1,628	1,736					
Independent	Elizabeth Noonan	0.9	373	387	412						
Independent	William Fitzsimon	0.6	236	246							
Electorate: 69,149 Valid: 40,815 Quota: 8,164 Turnout: 59.0%

=== 1977 general election ===
1977 general election: Dublin South-East
Party	Candidate	FPv%	Count						
Party	Candidate	FPv%	1	2	3	4	5	6	7
Fine Gael	Garret FitzGerald	31.9	8,553						
Fianna Fáil	Seán Moore	23.8	6,371	6,450	6,498	6,552	7,282		
Fianna Fáil	Peter Gibson	12.9	3,465	3,509	3,563	3,590	4,383	4,918	5,246
Labour	Ruairi Quinn	10.8	2,896	3,128	3,943	4,161	4,287	4,316	7,164
Fianna Fáil	Mary Harney	5.9	1,588	1,612	1,724	1,745			
Fine Gael	Peter Kelly	5.7	1,528	2,484	2,622	4,007	4,052	4,066	
Fine Gael	Peter Prendergast	4.9	1,304	1,663	1,723				
Labour	Mary Freehill	4.1	1,107	1,262					
Electorate: 41,066 Valid: 26,812 Spoilt: 250 (0.9%) Quota: 6,704 Turnout: 27,062 (65.9%)

=== 1973 general election ===
1973 general election: Dublin South-East
Party	Candidate	FPv%	Count						
Party	Candidate	FPv%	1	2	3	4	5	6	7
Fine Gael	Garret FitzGerald	31.1	7,958						
Fianna Fáil	Seán Moore	21.0	5,354	5,418	5,425	5,499	6,399		
Fianna Fáil	Patrick Cummins	13.0	3,329	3,348	3,354	3,415	4,016	4,042	
Labour	Ruairi Quinn	11.5	2,927	3,164	3,187	3,935	3,962	4,316	4,652
Fine Gael	Fergus O'Brien	7.6	1,945	2,764	2,777	2,854	2,876	4,195	4,691
Fianna Fáil	Patrick Norton	6.1	1,556	1,575	1,576	1,596			
Fine Gael	Peter Prendergast	5.1	1,312	1,697	1,710	1,748	1,774		
Sinn Féin	Andy Smith	4.2	1,082	1,098	1,128				
Independent	Ignatius O'Reilly	0.4	90	100					
Electorate: 37,840 Valid: 25,553 Quota: 6,389 Turnout: 67.5%

=== 1969 general election ===
1969 general election: Dublin South-East
Party	Candidate	FPv%	Count						
Party	Candidate	FPv%	1	2	3	4	5	6	7
Fine Gael	Garret FitzGerald	31.5	8,412						
Labour	Noël Browne	21.4	5,724	5,856	5,924	5,986	6,496	6,621	7,559
Fianna Fáil	Seán Moore	18.6	4,979	5,025	5,037	5,107	5,159	6,340	6,732
Fianna Fáil	Patrick Cummins	11.4	3,047	3,059	3,070	3,089	3,113	4,206	4,420
Fianna Fáil	Michael Donnelly	9.2	2,446	2,471	2,476	2,507	2,524		
Fine Gael	Fergus O'Brien	3.7	1,001	2,470	2,496	2,622	2,668	2,722	
Labour	John Kennedy	2.4	642	663	672	691			
Independent	Robert Ellis	1.2	312	331	348				
Independent	Thomas Banahan	0.6	158	165					
Electorate: 39,254 Valid: 26,721 Quota: 6,681 Turnout: 68.1%

=== 1965 general election ===
1965 general election: Dublin South-East
Party	Candidate	FPv%	Count			
Party	Candidate	FPv%	1	2	3	4
Fine Gael	John A. Costello	28.0	8,056			
Fianna Fáil	Seán MacEntee	27.2	7,823			
Fianna Fáil	Seán Moore	21.6	6,233	6,269	6,855	7,269
Labour	Noël Browne	18.6	5,348	5,426	5,452	6,681
Fine Gael	James O'Connor	4.7	1,352	2,090	2,097	
Electorate: 40,763 Valid: 28,812 Quota: 7,204 Turnout: 70.7%

=== 1961 general election ===
1961 general election: Dublin South-East
Party	Candidate	FPv%	Count			
Party	Candidate	FPv%	1	2	3	4
Fianna Fáil	Seán MacEntee	29.2	7,222			
Fine Gael	John A. Costello	25.6	6,332			
National Progressive Democrats	Noël Browne	19.1	4,717	4,772	4,785	6,359
Fianna Fáil	Seán Moore	15.0	3,720	4,667	4,674	5,413
Fine Gael	John O'Donovan	11.1	2,742	2,778	2,906	
Electorate: 40,081 Valid: 24,733 Quota: 6,184 Turnout: 61.7%

=== 1957 general election ===
1957 general election: Dublin South-East
Party	Candidate	FPv%	Count			
Party	Candidate	FPv%	1	2	3	4
Fine Gael	John A. Costello	28.4	6,918			
Independent	Noël Browne	24.8	6,035	6,095		
Fianna Fáil	Seán MacEntee	24.3	5,916	5,936	5,968	6,203
Fianna Fáil	Seán Moore	10.2	2,473	2,490	2,539	2,782
Fine Gael	John O'Donovan	5.5	1,332	2,032	2,149	2,846
Independent	Patrick Bermingham	5.3	1,291	1,312	1,466	
Clann na Poblachta	Gerry Callanan	1.6	396	405		
Electorate: 37,587 Valid: 24,361 Quota: 6,091 Turnout: 64.8%

=== 1954 general election ===
1954 general election: Dublin South-East
Party	Candidate	FPv%	Count			
Party	Candidate	FPv%	1	2	3	4
Fine Gael	John A. Costello	42.2	11,305			
Fianna Fáil	Seán MacEntee	22.3	5,971	6,059	6,190	6,391
Fianna Fáil	Noël Browne	20.5	5,489	5,647	5,974	6,273
Fine Gael	John O'Donovan	9.7	2,598	6,537	7,773	
Labour	Vincent MacDowell	5.4	1,455	1,870		
Electorate: 38,570 Valid: 26,818 Quota: 6,705 Turnout: 69.5%

=== 1951 general election ===
Unusually all third seats were filled on the first count on this occasion. Subsequent counts occurred because there was the possibility that surplus votes of elected candidates could have resulted in another candidate reaching the threshold of a third of a quota which would have meant their election deposit was returned to them.

1951 general election: Dublin South-East
Party	Candidate	FPv%	Count		
Party	Candidate	FPv%	1	2	3
Fine Gael	John A. Costello	31.4	9,222		
Independent	Noël Browne	28.9	8,473		
Fianna Fáil	Seán MacEntee	28.4	8,334		
Fianna Fáil	Michael Yeats	6.9	2,034	2,081	2,567
Fine Gael	J. Harold Douglas	2.4	710	2,389	2,868
Clann na Poblachta	Patrick McCartan	1.9	569	729	901
Electorate: 40,534 Valid: 29,342 Quota: 7,336 Turnout: 72.4%

=== 1948 general election ===
1948 general election: Dublin South-East
Party	Candidate	FPv%	Count				
Party	Candidate	FPv%	1	2	3	4	5
Fine Gael	John A. Costello	28.6	8,473				
Fianna Fáil	Seán MacEntee	24.9	7,371	7,382	7,397	7,628	
Clann na Poblachta	Noël Browne	16.6	4,917	4,982	5,459	6,841	7,851
Fine Gael	J. Harold Douglas	10.1	2,980	3,907	3,919	4,468	5,193
Fianna Fáil	Michael Yeats	9.9	2,928	2,938	2,962	3,145	
Labour	Eleanor Butler	8.1	2,399	2,442	2,478		
Clann na Poblachta	Donal O'Donoghue	1.9	559	569			
Electorate: 41,127 Valid: 29,627 Quota: 7,407 Turnout: 72.0%

== See also ==
- Politics of the Republic of Ireland
- Historic Dáil constituencies
- Elections in the Republic of Ireland
