= John Stafford (Irish politician) =

Irish former politician (born 1944)

Teachta Dála
- In office February 1987 – November 1992
- Constituency: Dublin Central

Lord Mayor of Dublin
- In office June 1997 – June 1998
- Preceded by: Brendan Lynch
- Succeeded by: Joe Doyle

Personal details
- Born: 20 May 1944 (age 81) Dublin, Ireland
- Party: Fianna Fáil
- Children: 3
- Parent: Thomas Stafford (father)

John Stafford (born 20 May 1944) is an Irish former Fianna Fáil politician. He was elected to Dáil Éireann as a Teachta Dála (TD) for the Dublin Central constituency at the 1987 general election. He was re-elected there at the 1989 general election, but owing to the 1992 boundary revisions he was unable to gain nomination there for Fianna Fáil in that year's general election. Instead he was selected to stand in Dublin North-Central, where he was unsuccessful.

A member of Dublin City Council, Stafford was Lord Mayor of Dublin from 1997 to 1998, and later proposed the motion which led to the council supporting the construction of the Spire of Dublin. The spire was opposed by his brother, councillor Tom Stafford. His father Thomas Stafford served as Lord Mayor of Dublin from 1967 to 1968.

Civic offices
| Preceded by Brendan Lynch | Lord Mayor of Dublin; 1997–1998 | Succeeded by Joe Doyle |

| Dáil | Election | Deputy (Party) | Deputy (Party) | Deputy (Party) | Deputy (Party) |
|---|---|---|---|---|---|
| 19th | 1969 | Frank Cluskey (Lab) | Vivion de Valera (FF) | Thomas J. Fitzpatrick (FF) | Maurice E. Dockrell (FG) |
| 20th | 1973 | Frank Cluskey (Lab) | Vivion de Valera (FF) | Thomas J. Fitzpatrick (FF) | Maurice E. Dockrell (FG) |
| 21st | 1977 | Constituency abolished | | | |

| Dáil | Election | Deputy (Party) | Deputy (Party) | Deputy (Party) | Deputy (Party) | Deputy (Party) |
|---|---|---|---|---|---|---|
| 22nd | 1981 | Bertie Ahern (FF) | Michael Keating (FG) | Alice Glenn (FG) | Michael O'Leary (Lab) | George Colley (FF) |
| 23rd | 1982 (Feb) | Bertie Ahern (FF) | Michael Keating (FG) | Tony Gregory (Ind) | Michael O'Leary (Lab) | George Colley (FF) |
| 24th | 1982 (Nov) | Bertie Ahern (FF) | Michael Keating (FG) | Tony Gregory (Ind) | Alice Glenn (FG) | George Colley (FF) |
| 24th | 1983 by-election | Bertie Ahern (FF) | Michael Keating (FG) | Tony Gregory (Ind) | Alice Glenn (FG) | Tom Leonard (FF) |
| 25th | 1987 | Bertie Ahern (FF) | Michael Keating (PDs) | Tony Gregory (Ind) | Dermot Fitzpatrick (FF) | John Stafford (FF) |
| 26th | 1989 | Bertie Ahern (FF) | Pat Lee (FG) | Tony Gregory (Ind) | Dermot Fitzpatrick (FF) | John Stafford (FF) |
| 27th | 1992 | Bertie Ahern (FF) | Jim Mitchell (FG) | Tony Gregory (Ind) | Joe Costello (Lab) | 4 seats 1992–2016 |
| 28th | 1997 | Bertie Ahern (FF) | Jim Mitchell (FG) | Tony Gregory (Ind) | Marian McGennis (FF) | 4 seats 1992–2016 |
| 29th | 2002 | Bertie Ahern (FF) | Dermot Fitzpatrick (FF) | Tony Gregory (Ind) | Joe Costello (Lab) | 4 seats 1992–2016 |
| 30th | 2007 | Bertie Ahern (FF) | Cyprian Brady (FF) | Tony Gregory (Ind) | Joe Costello (Lab) | 4 seats 1992–2016 |
| 30th | 2009 by-election | Bertie Ahern (FF) | Cyprian Brady (FF) | Maureen O'Sullivan (Ind) | Joe Costello (Lab) | 4 seats 1992–2016 |
| 31st | 2011 | Mary Lou McDonald (SF) | Paschal Donohoe (FG) | Maureen O'Sullivan (Ind) | Joe Costello (Lab) | 4 seats 1992–2016 |
| 32nd | 2016 | Mary Lou McDonald (SF) | Paschal Donohoe (FG) | Maureen O'Sullivan (Ind) | 3 seats 2016–2020 | |
| 33rd | 2020 | Mary Lou McDonald (SF) | Paschal Donohoe (FG) | Gary Gannon (SD) | Neasa Hourigan (GP) | 4 seats from 2020 |
| 34th | 2024 | Mary Lou McDonald (SF) | Paschal Donohoe (FG) | Gary Gannon (SD) | Marie Sherlock (Lab) | 4 seats from 2020 |
| 34th | 2026 by-election | Mary Lou McDonald (SF) | | Gary Gannon (SD) | Marie Sherlock (Lab) | 4 seats from 2020 |
