= Mary Freehill =

Irish former politician (born 1946)

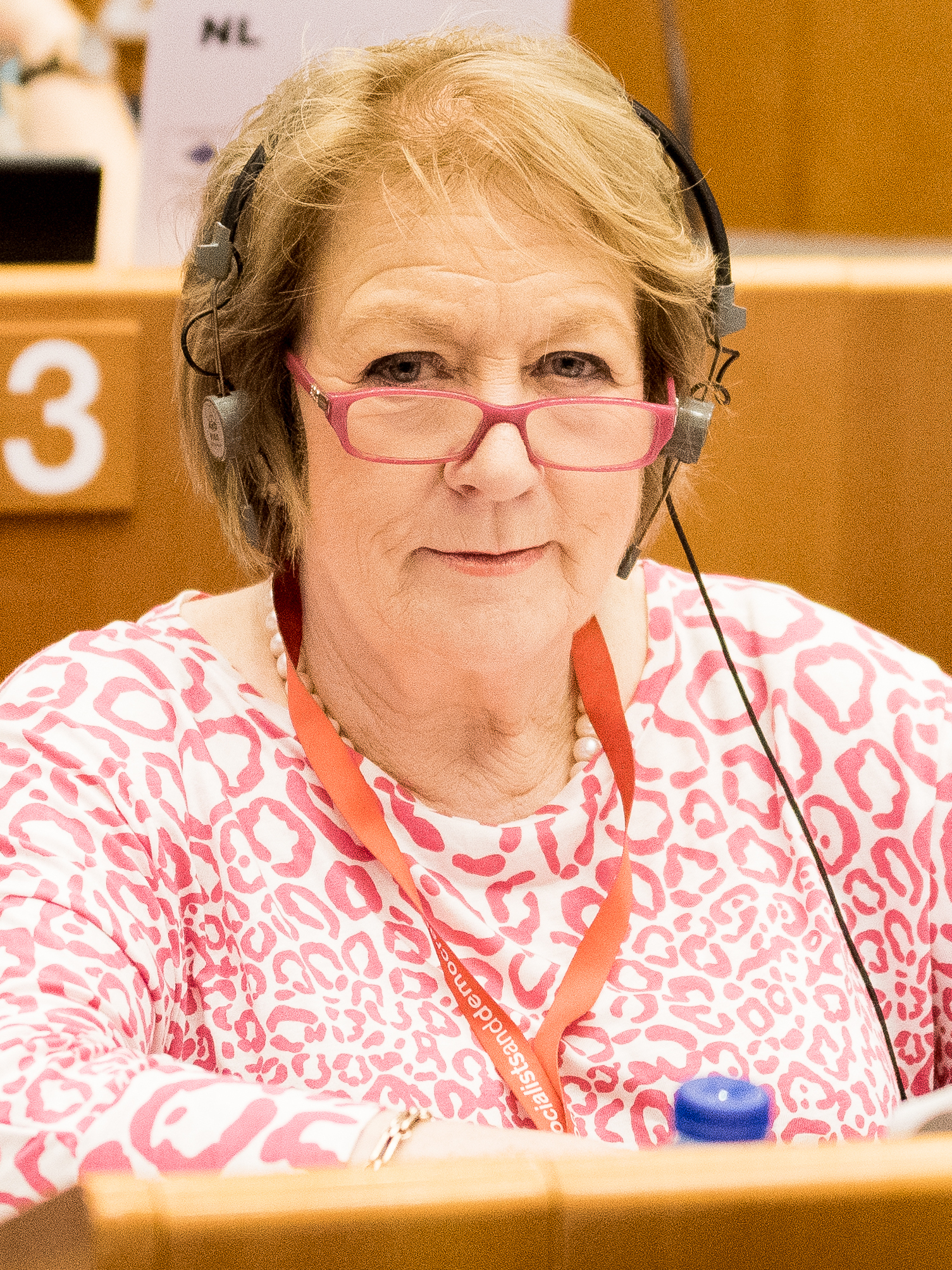
- Freehill in 2015

Dublin City Councillor
- In office 1977–2024
- Constituency: Kimmage–Rathmines

Lord Mayor of Dublin
- In office July 1999 – July 2000
- Preceded by: Joe Doyle
- Succeeded by: Maurice Ahern

Personal details
- Born: 22 July 1946 (age 79) Ballyconnell, County Cavan, Ireland
- Party: Labour Party

Mary Freehill (born 22 July 1946) is a former Dublin City Councillor, who served as the Lord Mayor of Dublin during the Millennium year from 5 July 1999 to 3 July 2000. She was a Labour Party councillor on Dublin City Council from 1977 to 2024.

Freehill was born and went to school in the town of Ballyconnell, County Cavan. Her parents were Bernard Freehill, a building contractor, and Kathleen Freehill (nee Donohoe) of Daisy Hill, Ballyconnell. She is a second cousin of Vin Scully, the former long-time play-by-play announcer for Major League Baseball's Los Angeles Dodgers.

Freehill was elected to the city council in 1977 to 1985 for Pembroke electoral area and was re-elected for Rathmines electoral area in 1991. She was re-elected at each subsequent local election (1999, 2004, 2009, 2014, 2019) for the same area. She was an unsuccessful Labour Party candidate for Dublin South-East at the 1977 and 1981 general elections, and for Dublin Central at the 1987 general election.

As Lord Mayor of Dublin City, she awarded the Freedom of the City to Nobel Peace Prize winner and Burma's pro-democracy leader Aung San Suu Kyi and also to the band U2.

Freehill did not contest the 2024 Dublin City Council election.

Civic offices
Preceded by Joe Doyle	Lord Mayor of Dublin; 1999–2000	Succeeded by Maurice Ahern
