= John Gormley =

Irish former politician (born 1959)

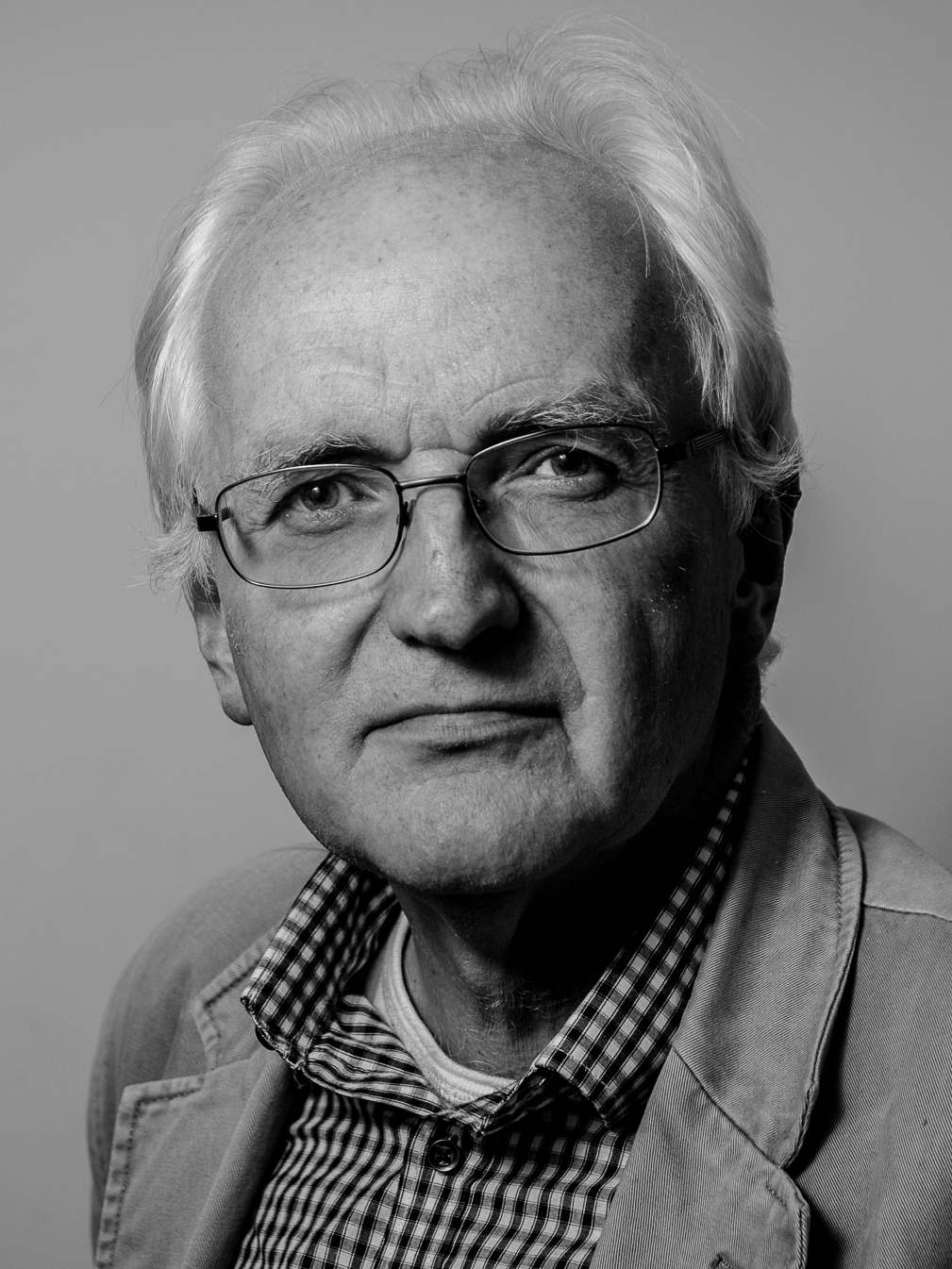
- Gormley in 2014

Minister for the Environment, Heritage and Local Government
- In office 14 June 2007 – 23 January 2011
- Taoiseach: Bertie Ahern; Brian Cowen
- Preceded by: Dick Roche
- Succeeded by: Éamon Ó Cuív

Leader of the Green Party
- In office 17 July 2007 – 27 May 2011
- Deputy: Mary White
- Preceded by: Trevor Sargent
- Succeeded by: Eamon Ryan

Lord Mayor of Dublin
- In office 11 June 1994 – 12 June 1995
- Preceded by: Tomás Mac Giolla
- Succeeded by: Seán Loftus

Teachta Dála
- In office June 1997 – February 2011
- Constituency: Dublin South-East

Personal details
- Born: 4 August 1959 (age 67) Ranelagh, Dublin, Ireland
- Party: Green Party
- Spouse: Penny Stuart (m. 1992)
- Children: 2
- Education: University College Dublin; University of Freiburg

John Gormley (born 4 August 1959) is an Irish former Green Party politician who served as Minister for the Environment, Heritage and Local Government from June 2007 to January 2011, Leader of the Green Party from June 2007 to May 2011 and Lord Mayor of Dublin from 1994 to 1995. He served as a Teachta Dála (TD) for Dublin South-East from 1997 to 2011.

== Early and personal life ==
Born in Dublin, Gormley was educated in St Munchin's College, Limerick; University College Dublin and the University of Freiburg. Prior to entering full-time politics, he ran an academy of European languages. He has held many positions in the Green Party including campaign director for the successful anti-smog campaign in the 1980s. He contested his first general election in 1989, in Dublin South-East, but was not elected. He also unsuccessfully contested the 1989 Seanad election and 1992 general election. In 1990, he wrote The Green Guide For Ireland, containing advice on how to live and campaign environmentally.

He lives in Ringsend with his wife, Penny, and their son and daughter.

== Political life ==
In 1991, he was elected to Dublin City Council. During his time as a member he was Lord Mayor of Dublin from 1994 to 1995, the first Green Party Councillor to serve as Lord Mayor. As Lord Mayor, he launched Dublin Gay Pride week in 1995.

=== Lord Mayor ===
He was the first Lord Mayor to launch Dublin Gay Pride week in 1995, although his predecessor, Tomás Mac Giolla had met with participants in the March in the previous year.

His Lord Mayor's Commission on Cycling, which produced a report on Cycling in Dublin, was seen as a significant advance for cycling in the city.

He also helped with the introduction of Sli na Slainte, a network of signposted walks for those seeking exercise to combat heart disease.

As part of the peace process he undertook a joint visit to the United States with the Lord Mayor of Belfast Hugh Smyth, of the Progressive Unionist Party.

Gormley also welcomed Prince Charles to the Mansion House (Residence of the Lord Mayor of Dublin). He subsequently met with protestors against the visit of Charles and agreed to visit the site of the Bloody Sunday Memorial in Derry.

He was the first elected representative in Ireland to have an email address, and when launching a new Irish web site, the virtual Irish pub he predicted the massive growth of the internet.

=== Dáil ===
At the 1997 general election, Gormley became the third Green candidate elected to Dáil Éireann – after a week-long re-count with Michael McDowell, which he won by 27 votes. Gormley and Trevor Sargent served as the only Green Party TDs between 1997 and 2002. He retained his seat at the 2002 general election, increasing his vote and taking the first seat in his constituency, though McDowell gained the most number of first preferences.

In the Dáil, on 15 October 1998, after Gormley declared that the Greens were the only party not to take money from the banks, Brian Cowen called him 'an incorrigible incorruptible'.

In 1998, he spoke against Ireland's participation in the Eurozone, stating that a monetary union without a fiscal union made no sense. In the same debate he predicted that the Euro could lead to the 'disintegration of the Union' because of 'the rise of extreme elements in Europe'. In the same debate he accused the Finance Minister Charlie McCreevy and the opposition of 'overheating' the economy.

In 2002, the business of the Dáil was suspended in uproar when Gormley insisted on getting an answer to his question regarding a tax on plastic bags.

He retained his seat at the 2002 general election, increasing his vote and taking the first seat in his constituency, though McDowell gained the most number of first preferences.

He was elected to the newly created post of party Cathaoirleach (chair) of the Green Party in 2002, and re-elected in late 2004 with 80% of the party vote. He proposed some of the major changes to the party structures such as the name change (from Green Alliance to Green Party); the need to have a party leader was suggested by Sargent.

On 16 May 2007, during the run up to the 2007 general election, Gormley emerged from a crowd of journalists to confront Michael McDowell, while he was unveiling a poster saying 'Left-Wing Government? No Thanks'. Gormley repeatedly requested McDowell to admit that the accompanying pamphlet on the matter was awash with lies. The incident fronted the evening's main news and the footage subsequently circulated on the Internet.

Gormley was re-elected at the 2007 general election, beating McDowell for the last seat by 304 votes. Following the election he led negotiations with Fianna Fáil on forming a government. The programme for government was approved by 86% of party members who attended a specially convened conference in Dublin's Mansion House, after which the party entered government for the first time. On 14 June 2007, he was named as Minister for the Environment, Heritage and Local Government in the new coalition.

=== Leader of Green Party ===
Following the general election of 2007, Trevor Sargent resigned as leader of the Green Party. The following leadership election was contested by Gormley and Patricia McKenna, and the Green Party announced that in the postal ballot he received 478 votes to McKenna's 263.

=== Minister for the Environment, Heritage and Local Government ===
As the new Minister for the Environment, Heritage and Local Government, Gormley took over the responsibility for the decision to allow the excavation of national monuments near the historical site of the Hill of Tara to facilitate the construction of the M3 motorway. On his final day in office, outgoing minister Dick Roche signed an order which allowed a newly discovered National Monument at Lismullin near Tara to be studied and then destroyed to make way for the building of the motorway. Gormley stated that he was unable for legal reasons to reverse this order. Green Party TD Ciarán Cuffe expressed his dissatisfaction with the former Minister Roche's decision and expressed his hope that Gormley could reverse it. Gormley appointed a long-standing critic of the M3 route, Dr. Conor Newman of NUIG, to oversee the archaeological work as part of a special committee on the Lismullen site. In 2009, the Tara-Skryne Valley was designated Ireland's first Landscape Conservation Area by Gormley, prohibiting shopping malls and retail parks from being constructed in the area.

In September 2007, he announced regulations introducing reductions in energy consumption and carbon emissions for all new homes in new building regulations. New homes are to be 40% more energy efficient, which will reduce the carbon footprint of each house by 40% also. The new regulations are also set to make renewable energy mandatory for all new build homes.

In his leader's speech to the Green Party conference in April 2008, he provoked a walk-out of the Chinese Ambassador and diplomatic delegation by calling for solidarity with the people of Tibet and referring to Tibet as a nation.

On 6 March 2008, Gormley established a Referendum Commission for the first referendum on the Treaty of Lisbon. The Minister did not restore the original remit of the commission – to outline arguments for and against the referendum – however during the campaign against the first Treaty of Nice referendum by the Green Party, Gormley had praised the role of the commission in advancing the pros and cons of the treaty.

In July 2008, changes to VRT and road tax which Gormley had brought about the previous year. The charges are now calculated on the basis of the carbon emissions of the vehicle. This had a dramatic effect according to the Sustainable Energy Authority of Ireland on the type of car sales that have occurred subsequently.

In November 2008, he announced new quality standards for rented accommodation which landlords would be obliged to follow. Additional funding for inspections and more severe penalties for landlords who provide substandard accommodation formed part of the initiative.

Gormley introduced a "Bike Scheme" in January 2009, which promoted cycling to work by offering tax incentives to employees and employers who purchased bicycles and switched to cycling. The scheme is part of a strategy to double the number of journeys made by bike by 2020, and also includes a multimillion-euro cycle-path upgrade plan.

In July 2009, Gormley introduced Non Principal Private Residence tax (NPPR), a tax on second homes and holiday homes, many of which were owned by people working abroad. It was a self-declaration tax with no bills being issued to property owners, leaving many caught unaware. The scheme was abandoned in 2014 with first and final bills/letters being issued to home owners. Severe penalties were attached to these letters, a late payment charge which amounted to 600 per cent of the premium (€1,000). In 2014 home owners, of which a significant number were non-resident in Ireland, were facing NPPR penalties up to €7,230 which remains as a permanent charge on the property until fully paid. There was uproar about the size of the penalties, especially from people who live overseas and who say they knew nothing about the NPPR charge until they got these letters. Many feel the 600 per cent penalty charge to be unconstitutional and some have taken their case to the Ombudsman.

In 2010, Gormley made a Ministerial order, forcing Councillors on Dún Laoghaire–Rathdown County Council, to revise a decision to rezone lands at The Park, Carrickmines (for retail development) during the framing of Dún Laoghaire–Rathdown's County Development Plan late in 2009. The Council ultimately voted for the proposal that was advanced by Fine Gael Councillors Jim O'Leary (now resigned) and Barry Ward, but this decision was the subject of much criticism from John Gormley's Green Party colleague and local TD, Ciarán Cuffe. In March 2010, the Minister instructed the council to reverse its decision.

In a close vote (with then Cathaoirleach Marie Baker exercising a casting a vote in favour of the Minister), the Council did change its decision, but the developer (Tristor Ltd.) took the Minister and Dún Laoghaire–Rathdown County Council to the High Court. Mr Justice Frank Clarke eventually ruled on the case in November 2010, finding that Minister Gormley had exceeded his powers by ordering the council to change its decision.

On 22 November 2010, he called for an election date to be fixed in the second half of January 2011 following the announcement of an EU financial rescue package for Ireland due to the ongoing financial crisis in the country. He resigned as Minister for the Environment, Heritage and Local Governmenton on 23 January 2011, when the Green Party withdrew from government.

=== 2011 general election and aftermath ===
Gormley lost his seat at the 2011 general election on 25 February 2011. He announced in an email to Green Party members on 20 March 2011, that he would not be seeking re-election as leader of the party. He was succeeded as party leader by Eamon Ryan on 27 May 2011.

Civic offices
Preceded by Tomás Mac Giolla	Lord Mayor of Dublin; 1994–1995	Succeeded by Seán Dublin Bay Rockall Loftus
Political offices
Preceded by Dick Roche	Minister for the Environment, Heritage and Local Government; 2007–2011	Succeeded by Éamon Ó Cuív
Party political offices
Preceded by Trevor Sargent	Leader of the Green Party; 2007–2011	Succeeded by Eamon Ryan

Dáil	Election	Deputy (Party)	Deputy (Party)	Deputy (Party)	Deputy (Party)
13th	1948	John A. Costello (FG)	Seán MacEntee (FF)	Noël Browne (CnaP)	3 seats 1948–1981
14th	1951	John A. Costello (FG)	Seán MacEntee (FF)	Noël Browne (Ind.)	3 seats 1948–1981
15th	1954	John A. Costello (FG)	Seán MacEntee (FF)	John O'Donovan (FG)	3 seats 1948–1981
16th	1957	John A. Costello (FG)	Seán MacEntee (FF)	Noël Browne (Ind.)	3 seats 1948–1981
17th	1961	John A. Costello (FG)	Seán MacEntee (FF)	Noël Browne (NPD)	3 seats 1948–1981
18th	1965	John A. Costello (FG)	Seán MacEntee (FF)	Seán Moore (FF)	3 seats 1948–1981
19th	1969	Garret FitzGerald (FG)	Noël Browne (Lab)	Seán Moore (FF)	3 seats 1948–1981
20th	1973	Garret FitzGerald (FG)	Fergus O'Brien (FG)	Seán Moore (FF)	3 seats 1948–1981
21st	1977	Garret FitzGerald (FG)	Ruairi Quinn (Lab)	Seán Moore (FF)	3 seats 1948–1981
22nd	1981	Garret FitzGerald (FG)	Gerard Brady (FF)	Seán Moore (FF)	Richie Ryan (FG)
23rd	1982 (Feb)	Garret FitzGerald (FG)	Gerard Brady (FF)	Ruairi Quinn (Lab)	Alexis FitzGerald Jnr (FG)
24th	1982 (Nov)	Garret FitzGerald (FG)	Gerard Brady (FF)	Ruairi Quinn (Lab)	Joe Doyle (FG)
25th	1987	Garret FitzGerald (FG)	Gerard Brady (FF)	Ruairi Quinn (Lab)	Michael McDowell (PDs)
26th	1989	Garret FitzGerald (FG)	Gerard Brady (FF)	Ruairi Quinn (Lab)	Joe Doyle (FG)
27th	1992	Frances Fitzgerald (FG)	Eoin Ryan Jnr (FF)	Ruairi Quinn (Lab)	Michael McDowell (PDs)
28th	1997	Frances Fitzgerald (FG)	Eoin Ryan Jnr (FF)	Ruairi Quinn (Lab)	John Gormley (GP)
29th	2002	Michael McDowell (PDs)	Eoin Ryan Jnr (FF)	Ruairi Quinn (Lab)	John Gormley (GP)
30th	2007	Lucinda Creighton (FG)	Chris Andrews (FF)	Ruairi Quinn (Lab)	John Gormley (GP)
31st	2011	Lucinda Creighton (FG)	Eoghan Murphy (FG)	Ruairi Quinn (Lab)	Kevin Humphreys (Lab)
32nd	2016	Constituency abolished. See Dublin Bay South.			
