= Brendan Lynch (politician) =

Irish politician (died 2018)

Lord Mayor of Dublin
- In office 1996–1997
- Preceded by: Seán D. Loftus
- Succeeded by: John Stafford

Personal details
- Born: Dublin, Ireland
- Died: 19 January 2018; Dublin, Ireland
- Political party: Independent
- Spouse: Peggy Scott
- Children: 5

Brendan Lynch (died 19 January 2018) was an Irish independent politician, who served as Lord Mayor of Dublin from 1996 to 1997. He was elected to Dublin City Council at the 1974 local elections as an independent councillor for the South Inner City electoral area, and was re-elected at each subsequent election until he retired from politics at the 1999 local elections. He was also the Honorary Director of Donore Credit Union, worked with The Irish Press and was a Peace Commissioner.

He died on 19 January 2018. He was married to Peggy Lynch (née Scott), and they had five children.

Civic offices
Preceded by Seán Dublin Bay Rockall Loftus	Lord Mayor of Dublin; 1996–1997	Succeeded by John Stafford
