= Linda Kavanagh =

Irish politician

Linda Kavanagh (died 17 March 2003) was a leading member of the Workers' Party and a member of Dublin City Council.

Linda Kavanagh died at the age of 46 on 17 March 2003 after a brief illness. A native of Inchicore she joined the Workers' Party in the mid-1980s and represented the party in a number of elections. She worked with former Workers' Party President and Dublin West TD Tomás Mac Giolla and when he retired from public life in 1998 she was co-opted in his place onto Dublin City Council.

She was involved in a number of community organisations in the Ballyfermot area and in Inchicore where she lived. She worked at St. James' Hospital and later became a full-time project worker with the Markiewicz Centre in Ballyfermot. She was the first chairperson of Ballyfermot Partnership and a founding member of the Lower Ballyfermot Tenants and Residents Association.

In the mid-1990s Kavanagh won a landmark Supreme Court ruling regarding the adoption rights of non-married couples and she had also won compensation for householders for conversion of their homes to smokeless fuels.

She pushed for the provision of a new club house for St. Matthew's Boxing Club in Ballyfermot and for the provision of a centre in Inchicore for drug misusers. The new centre was opened in 2006 and was named the Kavanagh Centre in her honour. It was officially opened on 4 May by the Minister of State at the Department of Community, Rural and Gaeltacht Affairs, Noel Ahern, disadvantaged and particularly drug misusers. I understand that one of her last tasks was to sign the legal papers to secure this building. I know that the management committee of the Inchicore Drug Team are very thankful to the Kavanagh family for allowing the use of her name for the premises. It will be a permanent reminder to all, of her work and dedication to the people of this community"
