= Seán Dublin Bay Rockall Loftus =

Irish environmentalist, barrister, and politician (1927–2010)

- Loftus in 1973

Teachta Dála
- In office June 1981 – February 1982
- Constituency: Dublin North-East

Dublin City Councillor
- In office June 1974 – June 1999
- Constituency: Clontarf

Lord Mayor of Dublin
- In office June 1995 – June 1996
- Preceded by: John Gormley
- Succeeded by: Brendan Lynch

Personal details
- Born: Seán Daniel Loftus; 1 November 1927 Dublin, Ireland
- Died: 10 July 2010 (aged 82) Dublin, Ireland
- Party: Independent
- Spouse: Úna Uí Lachtnáin (m. 1962)
- Children: 3
- Education: University College Dublin (attended); King's Inns
- Occupation: Lecturer

Seán Dublin Bay Rockall Loftus (1 November 1927 – 10 July 2010) was an Irish environmentalist, barrister and politician who drew attention to his campaign issues by changing his name. He was often known as "Dublin Bay Loftus". He was a member of Dublin City Council for 25 years, an alderman for much of that time, and a member of the council's Planning and Development Committee. Loftus is often credited as being one of the first advocates for environmentalism in Irish politics, with former Green Party leader John Gormley stating that Loftus "led the way even before the Green Party came into existence. Sean never wavered in his pursuit of the highest environmental ideals". Besides his environmentalist views, Loftus subscribed to the label of Christian Democrat and was socially conservative, opposing moves by Taoiseach Garret FitzGerald to liberalise Irish laws around divorce, contraceptives, and abortion.

== Background ==
Born Seán Daniel Loftus in Dublin in 1927, he was the eldest of seven siblings. He attended Coláiste Mhuire primary school on Parnell Square and received his secondary education at Catholic University School. His father was a doctor and Loftus attended medical school at University College Dublin but did not enjoy it, leaving before graduating. He moved to England in the late 1940s, where he worked as a builder. After six years, he returned to Ireland to attend King's Inns, qualifying as a barrister. He returned to England for several years before moving to the United States, where he worked and lectured. He moved back to Ireland in 1961. Loftus specialised in town planning law, lecturing in law at Bolton Street College of Technology (later the Dublin Institute of Technology). A resident of Clontarf, he campaigned for the sustainable development of Dublin Bay. Loftus was a devout Catholic. While he lived in the United States, he was an active member of the Montclair, New Jersey branch of an Irish-American Catholic fraternal organisation, the Ancient Order of Hibernians (AOH). He was guest of honor at the 1960 AOH National Convention by invitation of the National President, Jeremiah J. O’Callaghan. Loftus moved back to Ireland in 1961.

== Political career ==
During his time in America, Loftus met Eduardo Frei Montalva, who later became the leader of the Christian Democratic Party of Chile and President of Chile. The meeting with Montalva, who Loftus continued to admire afterwards, influenced Loftus to subscribe to the idea of Christian Democracy with corporatist influences. Due to this influence, during the late 1950s Loftus flirted with the hard-right "National Action" organisation, a group that advocated for "vocationalism", the localised Irish term for corporatism.

In 1961, Loftus founded the Christian Democrat Party of Ireland and stood for election to Dáil Éireann at the 1961 general election in the Dublin North-East constituency, the first of sixteen attempts. He contested every general election from 1961 to 1997. Although the party would exist for two decades, the Christian Democrat Party of Ireland struggled to register themselves on Ireland's official register of political parties and fought numerous court cases to achieve this. However, they were unsuccessful and partially because of this, the party never became any grander than a nexus of Rockall supporters.

In 1972 the Dublin Port and Docks Board proposed the building of an oil refinery in Dublin Bay. The plan was vigorously opposed by environmentalists, including Loftus, on the grounds that it posed a serious risk of pollution. Despite the motion having the support of larger political groups, such as Official Sinn Féin, the planned oil refinery was eventually rejected in 1976 thanks in part to Loftus bringing a bucket of polluted water from the bay to a public inquiry.

At the 1973 general election, Loftus stood for election to the Dáil in the Dublin North-Central constituency as a Christian Democrat on the issue of Dublin Bay. Because the party was too small to be registered under the Electoral Act 1963, meaning Loftus would be listed as 'Non-Party', he changed his name by deed poll to "Seán D. Christian Democrat Dublin Bay Loftus" in order that his political affiliation and campaign issue would appear on the ballot paper. Although not elected, he succeeded in highlighting the issue and the proposal was eventually turned down by the Minister for Local Government, James Tully. With the momentum from his campaign against the Dublin Bay oil refinery building, Loftus was elected to Dublin Corporation in 1974.

In the following years Loftus changed his name by deed poll several times more, to "Seán Dublin Bay Loftus", "Seán Dublin Bay Rockall Loftus" (as part of a campaign to press the Irish Government to make a territorial claim to the Rockall islet 424 kilometres (263 mi) off the coast of County Donegal) and "Seán Alderman Dublin Bay Rockall Loftus", among others. It was under this last name that he was elected to the 22nd Dáil for the Dublin North-East constituency at the 1981 general election. This Dáil was short-lived, however, and he himself contributed to the end of his Dáil career when he voted against John Bruton's budget in January 1982. During the early 1980s, Loftus supported the Anti H-Block movement and opposed attempts by Taoiseach Garret FitzGerald to liberalise Irish laws, suggesting FitzGerald was attempting "to dechristianise the people's constitution". At the February 1982 general election he stood in two constituencies, Dublin North-East and Dublin North-Central, but failed to win a seat in either.

Loftus continued to contest Dáil and European Parliament elections until 1997. He remained on Dublin City Council, and served as Lord Mayor of Dublin from 1995 to 1996.

Loftus remained active as a member and honorary legal advisor of Dublin Bay Watch, and led opposition to the 2002 application by the Dublin Port Company to fill in 52 acres (210,000 m^{2}) of Dublin Bay. The application was rejected in June 2010 by the planning board, An Bord Pleanála, while Loftus was in hospital, having undergone brain surgery. Local councillor Gerry Breen said its rejection was a "fitting tribute" to Loftus.

== Personal life ==
In 1962, Loftus married Úna Uí Lachtnáin, a home economics teacher from Cootehill, County Cavan. They had 3 children. A committed Gaeilgeoir, she became heavily involved in Oireachtas na Gaeilge, and was elected President of Oireachtas na Gaeilge in 2011. Uí Lachtnáin also served several years as Chairperson of the Dublin City Community Forum and was a founding member of the Bull Island Action Group.

== Death ==
Loftus died on 10 July 2010 at the Mater Private Hospital. His funeral mass took place at St. Gabriel's Roman Catholic Church in Dollymount and he was interred at St. Fintan's Cemetery, Sutton on 12 July 2010. His widow Úna Uí Lachtnáin died on 1 April 2014.

Civic offices
Preceded by John Gormley	Lord Mayor of Dublin; 1995–1996	Succeeded by Brendan Lynch

Dáil	Election	Deputy (Party)	Deputy (Party)	Deputy (Party)	Deputy (Party)	Deputy (Party)
9th	1937	Alfie Byrne (Ind.)	Oscar Traynor (FF)	James Larkin (Ind.)	3 seats 1937–1948	
10th	1938	Alfie Byrne (Ind.)	Oscar Traynor (FF)	Richard Mulcahy (FG)	3 seats 1937–1948	
11th	1943	Alfie Byrne (Ind.)	Oscar Traynor (FF)	James Larkin (Lab)	3 seats 1937–1948	
12th	1944	Alfie Byrne (Ind.)	Oscar Traynor (FF)	Harry Colley (FF)	3 seats 1937–1948	
13th	1948	Alfie Byrne (Ind.)	Oscar Traynor (FF)	Harry Colley (FF)	Jack Belton (FG)	Peadar Cowan (CnaP)
14th	1951	Alfie Byrne (Ind.)	Oscar Traynor (FF)	Harry Colley (FF)	Jack Belton (FG)	Peadar Cowan (Ind.)
15th	1954	Alfie Byrne (Ind.)	Oscar Traynor (FF)	Harry Colley (FF)	Jack Belton (FG)	Denis Larkin (Lab)
15th	1956 by-election	Patrick Byrne (FG)	Oscar Traynor (FF)	Harry Colley (FF)	Jack Belton (FG)	Denis Larkin (Lab)
16th	1957	Patrick Byrne (FG)	Oscar Traynor (FF)	Charles Haughey (FF)	Jack Belton (FG)	Denis Larkin (Lab)
17th	1961	Patrick Byrne (FG)	George Colley (FF)	Charles Haughey (FF)	Jack Belton (FG)	Eugene Timmons (FF)
17th	1963 by-election	Patrick Byrne (FG)	George Colley (FF)	Charles Haughey (FF)	Paddy Belton (FG)	Eugene Timmons (FF)
18th	1965	Patrick Byrne (FG)	George Colley (FF)	Charles Haughey (FF)	Paddy Belton (FG)	Denis Larkin (Lab)
19th	1969	Conor Cruise O'Brien (Lab)	Eugene Timmons (FF)	Charles Haughey (FF)	Paddy Belton (FG)	4 seats 1969–1977
20th	1973	Conor Cruise O'Brien (Lab)	Eugene Timmons (FF)	Charles Haughey (FF)	Paddy Belton (FG)	4 seats 1969–1977
21st	1977	Constituency abolished				

Dáil	Election	Deputy (Party)	Deputy (Party)	Deputy (Party)	Deputy (Party)
22nd	1981	Michael Woods (FF)	Liam Fitzgerald (FF)	Seán Dublin Bay Rockall Loftus (Ind.)	Michael Joe Cosgrave (FG)
23rd	1982 (Feb)	Michael Woods (FF)	Maurice Manning (FG)	Ned Brennan (FF)	Michael Joe Cosgrave (FG)
24th	1982 (Nov)	Michael Woods (FF)	Maurice Manning (FG)	Liam Fitzgerald (FF)	Michael Joe Cosgrave (FG)
25th	1987	Michael Woods (FF)	Pat McCartan (WP)	Liam Fitzgerald (FF)	Michael Joe Cosgrave (FG)
26th	1989	Michael Woods (FF)	Pat McCartan (WP)	Liam Fitzgerald (FF)	Michael Joe Cosgrave (FG)
27th	1992	Michael Woods (FF)	Tommy Broughan (Lab)	Liam Fitzgerald (FF)	Seán Kenny (Lab)
28th	1997	Michael Woods (FF)	Tommy Broughan (Lab)	Martin Brady (FF)	Michael Joe Cosgrave (FG)
29th	2002	Michael Woods (FF)	Tommy Broughan (Lab)	Martin Brady (FF)	3 seats from 2002
30th	2007	Michael Woods (FF)	Tommy Broughan (Lab)	Terence Flanagan (FG)	3 seats from 2002
31st	2011	Seán Kenny (Lab)	Tommy Broughan (Lab)	Terence Flanagan (FG)	3 seats from 2002
32nd	2016	Constituency abolished. See Dublin Bay North			
