= Joe Doyle (politician) =

Irish politician (1936–2009)

Senator
- In office 17 February 1993 – 12 September 2002
- In office 25 April 1987 – 15 June 1989
- Constituency: Administrative Panel

Teachta Dála
- In office June 1989 – November 1992
- In office November 1982 – February 1987
- Constituency: Dublin South-East

Lord Mayor of Dublin
- In office June 1998 – June 1999
- Preceded by: John Stafford
- Succeeded by: Mary Freehill

Personal details
- Born: 27 June 1936 County Dublin, Ireland
- Died: 8 August 2009 (aged 73) County Dublin, Ireland
- Party: Fine Gael
- Spouse: Margaret Mary Maguire (m. 1969)
- Children: 3

Joseph Doyle (27 June 1936 – 8 August 2009) was an Irish Fine Gael politician. He served two terms as a deputy for the Dublin South-East constituency. He served variously as a member of Dublin City Council, Dáil Éireann and Seanad Éireann, becoming Lord Mayor of Dublin from 1998 to 1999.

== Political career ==
Doyle, a former sacristan in the local Roman Catholic church in Donnybrook, was first elected to public office at the 1979 local elections, to represent the Pembroke area for Fine Gael on Dublin City Council. He served continually in City Hall from 1979 until his retirement at the 2004 local elections. Between 1998 and 1999 he served as Lord Mayor of Dublin.

He was elected to Dáil Éireann as a Fine Gael Teachta Dála (TD) for Dublin South-East at the November 1982 general election, where his party constituency colleague was party leader (and after the election Taoiseach) Garret FitzGerald.

== Rebellion on abortion ==
Doyle achieved early party notoriety in 1983, when he was one of eight Fine Gael TDs to defy the party and vote against the Fine Gael–Labour Party coalition's proposed wording to the anti-abortion constitutional amendment. Whereas the government's wording included a negative prohibition, namely that nothing in the constitution should be interpreted as granting a right to abortion, Doyle—along with Alice Glenn and some other colleagues—endorsed the Fianna Fáil alternative wording that granted a "right to life to the unborn, with due regard to the equal right of the mother". Because of the controversial nature of the issue of abortion, and the fact that Fine Gael was split on it, he was not sacked from the party for breaking the party whip.

== Winning and losing seats ==
He was one of a number of TDs to lose their seats at the 1987 general election. At the Seanad election that followed, he was elected by the Administrative Panel to sit in the upper house (Seanad Éireann). He regained his Dáil seat at the 1989 general election, where he and FitzGerald achieved two seats out of four with a tight vote-management strategy. However, he lost his seat again at the 1992 general election to new running mate Frances Fitzgerald. Though he contested the 1997 general election—under party pressure because it saw Doyle as the party's best chance to win a seat, even though he had originally decided not to contest any more general elections—he failed to regain a Dáil seat. He had the consolation of retaining his Senate seat in the election to the 21st Seanad.

== Lord Mayor of Dublin ==
Doyle served as Lord Mayor of Dublin from 1998 to 1999. He was central to the decision to erect the Spire of Dublin, on the site of Nelson's Pillar.

On his retirement from Dublin City Council in 2004, his political rival, Labour Party Dublin City Councillor Dermot Lacey, paid the following tribute: "I have long respected his integrity and commitment to achieving what he believed was best for the people he represented. In many ways Joe as a politician is the epitome of the historic mandate of Fine Gael - honourable, conservative, compassionate and committed to the democratic institutions of our State."

== Epilepsy ==
Doyle openly discussed in public life his lifelong experience of battling with epilepsy, a consequence of which was that he could not drive, normally a necessity for a local representative elected from a constituency.

== Best man at Brendan Behan's wedding ==
He also revealed that as sacristan in the local church he had been best man at the wedding of Irish playwright and author Brendan Behan, when Behan found himself without a best man at the ceremony.

== Personal life and family ==
Joe Doyle married Margaret Mary Maguire on 11 February 1969 in the Church of the Sacred Heart, Donnybrook, Dublin. They had two sons and one daughter. Joe's step-brother, John Doyle (1925–2009), was also active in politics and was Conservative Mayor and Bailiff of Hemel Hempstead in 1969.

Doyle was educated at CBS Westland Row.

Civic offices
Preceded by John Stafford	Lord Mayor of Dublin; 1998–1999	Succeeded by Mary Freehill

Dáil	Election	Deputy (Party)	Deputy (Party)	Deputy (Party)	Deputy (Party)
13th	1948	John A. Costello (FG)	Seán MacEntee (FF)	Noël Browne (CnaP)	3 seats 1948–1981
14th	1951	John A. Costello (FG)	Seán MacEntee (FF)	Noël Browne (Ind.)	3 seats 1948–1981
15th	1954	John A. Costello (FG)	Seán MacEntee (FF)	John O'Donovan (FG)	3 seats 1948–1981
16th	1957	John A. Costello (FG)	Seán MacEntee (FF)	Noël Browne (Ind.)	3 seats 1948–1981
17th	1961	John A. Costello (FG)	Seán MacEntee (FF)	Noël Browne (NPD)	3 seats 1948–1981
18th	1965	John A. Costello (FG)	Seán MacEntee (FF)	Seán Moore (FF)	3 seats 1948–1981
19th	1969	Garret FitzGerald (FG)	Noël Browne (Lab)	Seán Moore (FF)	3 seats 1948–1981
20th	1973	Garret FitzGerald (FG)	Fergus O'Brien (FG)	Seán Moore (FF)	3 seats 1948–1981
21st	1977	Garret FitzGerald (FG)	Ruairi Quinn (Lab)	Seán Moore (FF)	3 seats 1948–1981
22nd	1981	Garret FitzGerald (FG)	Gerard Brady (FF)	Seán Moore (FF)	Richie Ryan (FG)
23rd	1982 (Feb)	Garret FitzGerald (FG)	Gerard Brady (FF)	Ruairi Quinn (Lab)	Alexis FitzGerald Jnr (FG)
24th	1982 (Nov)	Garret FitzGerald (FG)	Gerard Brady (FF)	Ruairi Quinn (Lab)	Joe Doyle (FG)
25th	1987	Garret FitzGerald (FG)	Gerard Brady (FF)	Ruairi Quinn (Lab)	Michael McDowell (PDs)
26th	1989	Garret FitzGerald (FG)	Gerard Brady (FF)	Ruairi Quinn (Lab)	Joe Doyle (FG)
27th	1992	Frances Fitzgerald (FG)	Eoin Ryan Jnr (FF)	Ruairi Quinn (Lab)	Michael McDowell (PDs)
28th	1997	Frances Fitzgerald (FG)	Eoin Ryan Jnr (FF)	Ruairi Quinn (Lab)	John Gormley (GP)
29th	2002	Michael McDowell (PDs)	Eoin Ryan Jnr (FF)	Ruairi Quinn (Lab)	John Gormley (GP)
30th	2007	Lucinda Creighton (FG)	Chris Andrews (FF)	Ruairi Quinn (Lab)	John Gormley (GP)
31st	2011	Lucinda Creighton (FG)	Eoghan Murphy (FG)	Ruairi Quinn (Lab)	Kevin Humphreys (Lab)
32nd	2016	Constituency abolished. See Dublin Bay South.			
