= Female genital mutilation in India =

Ritual cutting of female genitals in India

Female genital mutilation (FGM) is a cultural practice that occurs in several cultures and is practised in India by some Islamic groups. The Dawoodi Bohra is one sect of Islam in India known for their practice of FGM, with other Bohra sects reported as partaking in practices of FGM as well. The procedure frequently occurs at the age of seven and involves "all procedures involving partial or total removal of the external female genitalia or other injury to the female genital organs.". The process is typically performed by a traditional practitioner using a knife or a blade and can range from Type I to Type IV. The consequences of FGM take on a wide range and can span from discomfort to sepsis and have also been correlated with psychological consequences, such as post-traumatic stress disorder.

The topic of FGM has remained highly controversial and has garnered both support and opposition for the practice due to its roots in cultural and religious practices. International efforts have ensued to raise awareness on practices of FGM, and cases have been made to ban such practices in India. In opposition, Dawoodi Bohra women have argued for the procedure, citing their religious and cultural freedoms as means for its authorization. Despite legal efforts to ban FGM practices in India, it has not been recognized as prevalent in India and remains legal.

== Practice ==
India pictured on a globe; one of the leading locations for FGM.

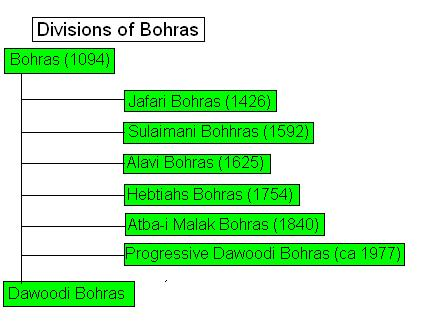
Graph outlining the Dahwoodi Bohra sections.

FGM is practised by the Dawoodi Bohra, a sect of Shia Islam with one million members in India. Known as khatna, khafz, and khafd, the procedure is performed on six- or seven-year-old girls and involves the total or partial removal of the clitoral hood. The spiritual leader of the Dawoodi Bohra, Mufaddal Saifuddin, clarified that while "[r]eligious books, written over a thousand years ago, specify the requirements for both males and females as acts of religious purity", the Bohras must "respect the law of the land" and refrain from carrying out Islamic female circumcision in countries where it is prohibited. Other Bohra sects including the Sulemani Bohras and the Alavi Bohras, as well as some Sunni communities in Kerala, are reported as practising FGM.

=== Consequences ===
Meghana Reddy J, a gynaecologist, reported in 2018 that khatna can lead to complications in later life, including difficult deliveries and urinary infections. In one case a girl had developed sepsis after having had khatna and great effort had been required to revive her.

In conjunction with a small study, the first of its kind in India, twenty Bohras were examined by Sujaat Vali, an obstetrician and gynaecologist, who reported that only a specialist would be able to separate and cut the clitoral hood without also cutting the clitoris, and the clitoris had been cut in most cases examined. According to Vali, "[h]alf of them feel some kind of irritation, while 30% either feel discomfort while walking/urinating or have lost sensitivity in the area." The study covered 83 women and 11 men from five Indian states and found that 75 per cent of the respondents' daughters who were at least seven years old had been subjected to FGM.

Although the practice of FGM in India or in the Dawoodi Bohra community has yet to be adequately researched, an informal poll of Dawoodi Bohra women concluded that with Type I FGM, the most commonly used type in Dawoodi Bohra tradition, no health consequences occurred.

== Activism ==
=== Opposition and support ===
In November 2011, a 21-year-old law student posted an online petition requesting that Mohammed Burhanuddin, the then religious leader of the Dawoodi Bohras, ban FGM. A spokesman ruled out any change saying "Bohra women should understand that our religion advocates the procedure and they should follow it without any argument."

Two Mumbai-based groups, Sahiyo and We Speak Out, launched a campaign in February 2016 called "Each One Reach One"; the campaign was repeated during Ramadan in 2017. The campaign promoted conversations about female genital cutting. In an online survey of Bohra women, Sahiyo found that khatna had been performed on 80 per cent of participants, with most cut when aged six or seven; 81 per cent wanted the practice to stop.

==== The United Nations ====
In 2012 The United Nations declared February 6 as International Day of Zero Tolerance for Female Genital Mutilation. This was done in an effort to raise awareness around FGM. Alongside, declaring this day UN created a joint programme surrounding the ban of FGM. In 2023 they created a theme that partnered with the #MenEndFGM group Called "Partnership with Men and Boys to transform Social and Gender Norms to end FGM."

On 10 December 2016 (Human Rights Day), a group of Dawoodi Bohra women started an online petition calling for FGM to be banned. A similar petition was conducted by the group a year earlier; that petition was submitted to India's Women and Child Development Minister Maneka Gandhi. Also that month, Dawoodi Bohra women petitioned the United Nations demanding that India be recognised as a country where Female Genital Mutilation (FGM) or Female Genital Cutting (FGC) is practised. In September 2017, when the 36th regular session of the United Nations Human Rights Council (UNHRC) was conducting a Universal Periodic Review of India, a written submission on FGM in India was presented at a side event. That was the first time the issue of FGM in India had been raised at the United Nations.

==== The Dawoodi Bohra Women for Religious Freedom ====
The Dawoodi Bohra Women for Religious Freedom (DBWRF) was established in May 2017 by six Bohra women to support their "beliefs, customs, culture and religious rights". It claims to represent the views of nearly 75,000 women who are followers of Mufaddal Saifuddin. The DBWRF states that the form of FGM practiced by the Dawoodi Bohra is a harmless procedure and not mutilation.

DBWRF's stated mission is to "stand for the rights of Dawoodi Bohra women in India" to ensure they have the same freedom as other citizens, particularly by defending women who are victimised for their religious beliefs, practices, customs and culture. In the face of controversy, DBWRF has taken the lead in ensuring that the practice of FGM is protected. In July 2018, senior advocate Abhishek Manu Singhvi represented the DBWRF during proceedings in the Supreme Court and stated that "the practice of khafz is an essential part of the religion as practised by Dawoodi Bohra Community and their right to practise and propagate religion is protected under Articles 25 and 26 of the Constitution of India".

== Misogyny and FGM in India ==
Considering the discord and public aversion to FGM worldwide and specifically in India, it is significant to see the factors that affect and sustain the practice of FGM in India, misogyny being one of the leading factors.

With gender politics in mind, "In India and in the West, there is a tendency to see gender violence and misogyny in India as an expression of 'culture' and 'tradition'" which adds context as to why FGM is heavily unmentioned but also considered a social norm within the Indian Bohra community.

FGM is a social norm in the Indian Bohra community and, "nonconformity to social norms is commonly sanctioned to various degrees with consequences ranging from personal feelings of guilt to social exclusion, stigma, and shame" which furthers the pressure to conform to FGM in order to fit into ones community.

FGM in the Bohra community, "is believed to mark a rite of passage to adulthood, girls are robbed of their sexuality at a very young age just so the Patriarchal culture demands it." Although, individuals within this community believe in this, women that have gone through the process feel as if it's a,"direct attack on a woman's sexuality."

Due to such firm beliefs in this tradition other stances and claims have been made in order to reinforce the pursuit of FGM in the Bohra community. One claim made by many FGM practicing communities is that, "uncut women are prohibited from participating in important religious celebration," or are considered to, "bring bad luck into the bride's life."

"Understanding the complex social norms and cultural value systems that shape the meaning and significance of the practice within this community is critical to the work of anti-FGC advocates" as it enforces that Bohra women are not dehumanized, and that their culture is still respected despite the practice of FGM.

== Supreme Court ==
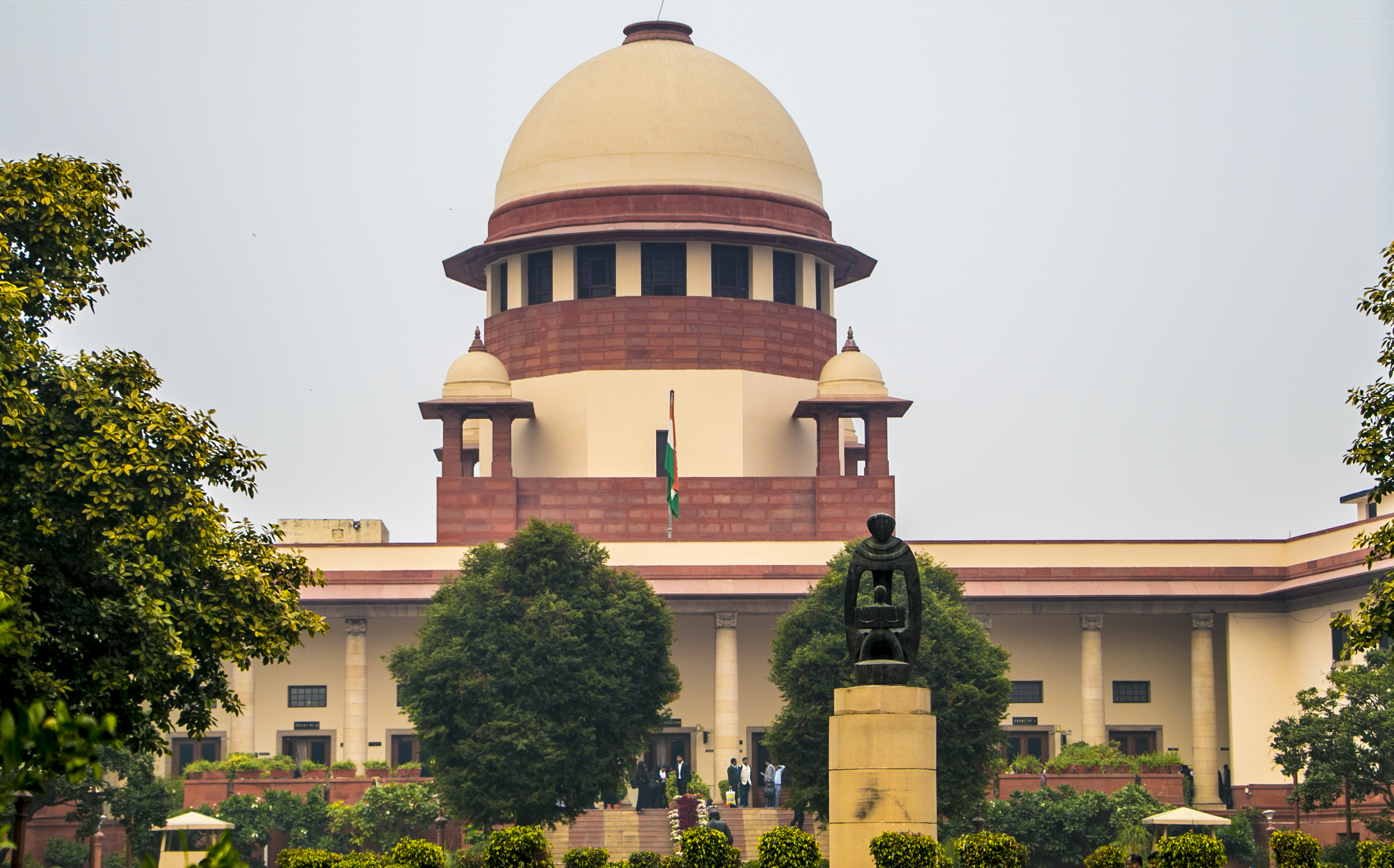
Part of the Supreme Court of India.

In May 2017, a public interest litigation (PIL) case was raised in India's Supreme Court. The case was filed by Sunita Tiwari, a lawyer based in Delhi, and sought a ban on FGM in India. The Supreme Court received the petition and sought responses from four states and four central government ministries.

An advocate for the petition claimed the practice violated children's rights under Article 14 (Right to Equality) and Article 21 (Right to Life) of the Constitution of India, while an advocate opposing the petition argued that khafz is an essential part of the community's religion, and their right to practise the religion is protected under Articles 25 and 26.

The Ministry of Women and Child Development reported in December 2017 that "there is no official data or study which supports the existence of FGM in India." Earlier, in May 2017, Women and Child Development Minister Maneka Gandhi announced that the government will ban FGM if it is not voluntarily stopped.

In April 2018 India's Attorney General K. K. Venugopal asked a bench of the Supreme Court to issue directions regarding the case, saying that FGM was already a crime under existing law. The bench adjourned the case and issued notices to Kerala and Telangana, having earlier notified Maharashtra, Gujarat, Rajasthan and Delhi.

In September 2018 the Supreme Court referred the PIL to a five-judge constitution bench at the request of Venugopal and the counsel for the Dawoodi Bohras. In November 2019, the Supreme Court decided that the issue of FGM be referred to a larger seven-judge bench and that it be examined alongside other women's rights issues. The court said it was a "seminal issue" regarding the power of the court to decide whether a practice is essential to a religion.

== See also ==
- Prevalence of female genital mutilation by country
