= Gishiri =

Gishiri may refer to:

- Gishiri cutting, a form of female genital mutilation practiced in Northern Nigeria and Southern Niger
- Gishiri Village, a village in the Maitama District of Abuja, Nigeria
