= Khanim Latif =

Iraqi activist

Khanim Rahim Latif

Executive Director of Asuda
- Incumbent
- Assumed office January 21, 2002

Personal details
- Born: Sulaymaniyah, Iraq
- Spouse: Kamal Rauf
- Children: 1
- Website: Website

Khanim Rahim Latif (Sorani Kurdish: خانم لەتیف, romanized: Xanim Letîf; Arabic: خانم لطيف, romanized: Xanim Latīf),(born in Sulaymaniyah, Iraq) is a liberal human and women’s rights activist in Iraqi Kurdistan who seeks to defend equality and offer women a refuge from gender-based violence.

== Early life and education ==
Latif has bachelor's degree in Law and Political Science in 2014-2015 and Diploma in Social Work Practice from the Canterbury Christ Church University in the UK in 2006.

== Career ==
Latif joined the women's rights movement in Kurdistan in 2000. In 2002, she founded the first women's protection shelter providing refuge to victims of gender based violence and honor killing. She was appointed as the Director for Asuda, the first independent NGO to focus on violence against women in Iraq based in the city of Sulaymaniyah. She has published several booklets and books in Kurdish including Consequences of violence against women. Latif also translated into Kurdish several international conventions and documents on women’s rights such as CEDAW.

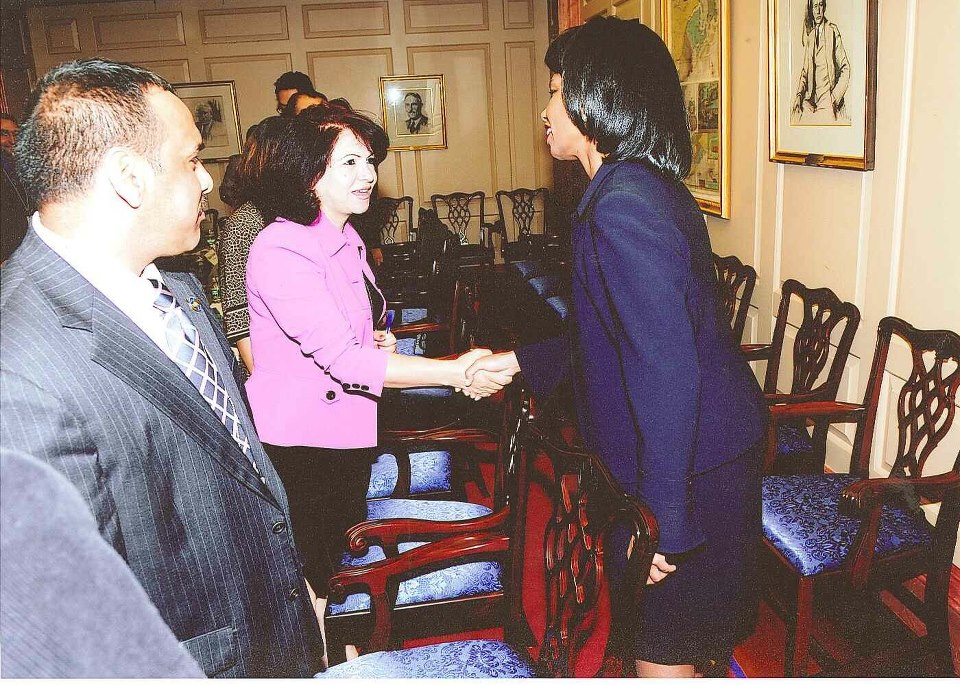
Khanim Latif meeting with former US Secretary of State Condoleezza Rice at the US State Department, 2008

Latif has been a member of Frontline Defenders International since 2010, a member of the Kurdish National Congress (KNK) since 2011, and a member of Amnesty International since 2006. She has worked extensively on UNSCR1325 related activities in Iraq and Kurdistan and is a founding member of UNSCR1325 Iraq National Action Plan (INAP) coalition. Latif is also an adviser Global Fund for Women for Middle East and North Africa. Latif is also a member of the Honor Based Violence Awareness Network.

Latif was selected as an independent candidate for the Iraqi National Assembly (Parliament) elections for the 2005 elections. She attended many of the countrywide conferences, workshops and symposiums on women in Baghdad and other Iraqi cities. She also participated in campaigning for endorsing a 25% quota for female participation in the future legislative authorities in Iraq/National Assembly.

Latif was selected as nominee for the US Department of State Women of Courage Award in 2008 and a nominee for 2016 Vital Voices Global Leadership Award.

Latif contributes to many reports by international and local organizations and media about women's issues in Kurdistan and Iraq and has been interviewed by international media as a source of information with regard to women's rights in Iraq.

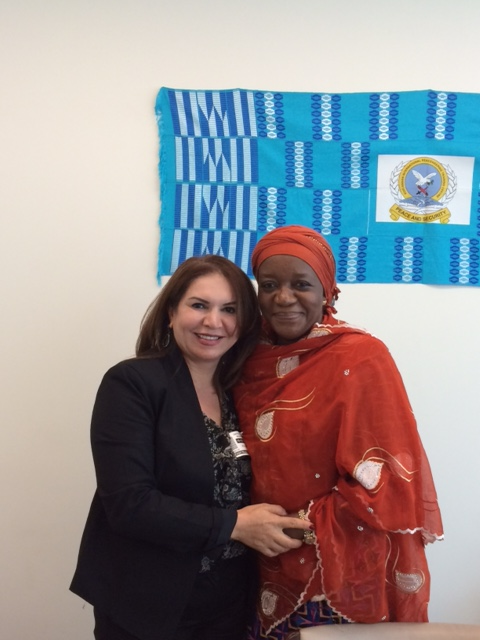
Khanim Latif meeting with Zainab Hawa Bangura, United Nations Secretary-General Special Representative on Sexual Violence in Conflict, March 2016

Latif also regularly participates in international, regional, countrywide and local events and conferences on women's rights and SGBV in Iraq.

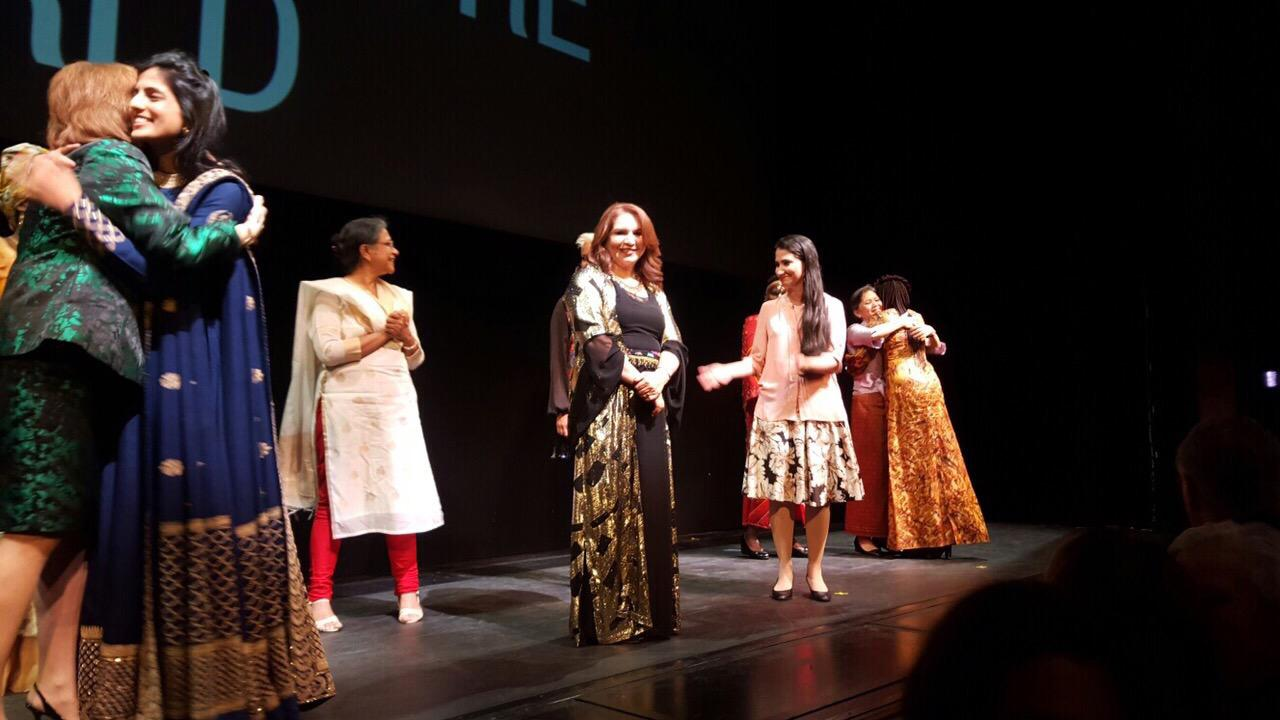
Khanim Latif at the Vital Voices Global Leadership Award Ceremony-2016, at the Kennedy Arts Center

In 2014, after the terrorist group ISIS began a violent campaign against the region’s Yazidi population, Latif contributed to the search for women survivors in abandoned buildings and temporary shelters. She discovered that ISIS had abducted at least 2,000 women during the attack. As some of the abducted women started to escape, Latif sought them out and offered Asuda’s care. She learned that women were being tortured, sold, sexually abused and forced into labor and publicized these atrocities locally and globally.

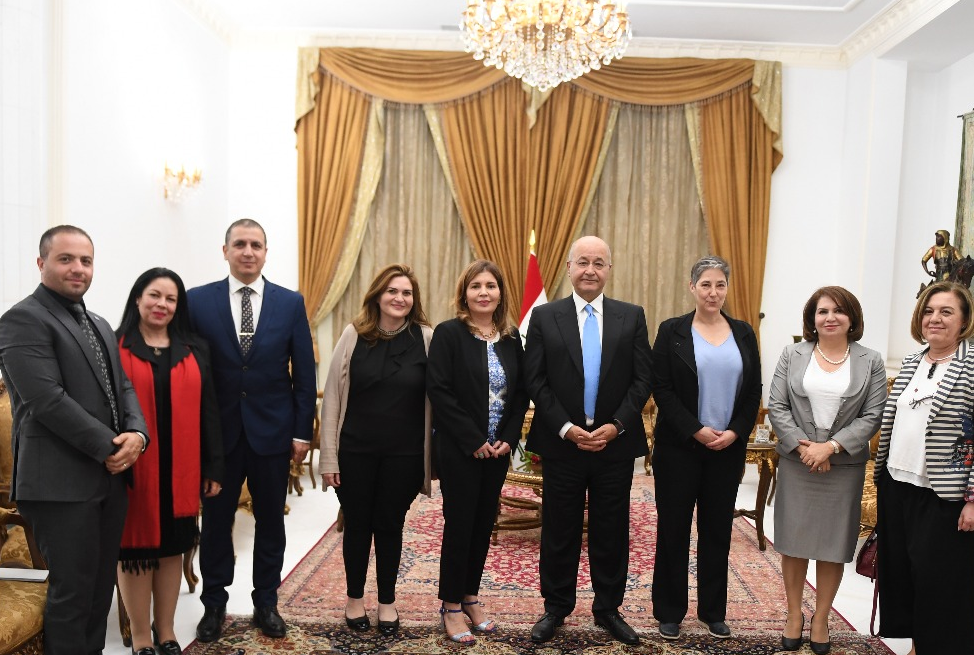

In 2019 Khanim Latif become Iraqi President Advisor for Gender and Civil Society

UN Security Council Briefing on Iraq by Khanim Latif Khanim Latif, Iraqi civil society activist and Founder and Executive Director of Asuda for Combating Violence against Women, was invited to provide a civil society perspective and recommendations when the Security Council met to discuss the situation in Iraq in May 2023. The NGO Working Group on Women, Peace and Security facilitated her statement but she did not speak on behalf of the NGOWG.

== Personal life ==
Latif is married to Kamal Rauf, a journalist in Iraqi Kurdistan and Director of Sharpress publications and has one daughter.

== Awards ==
In recognition for her work and contribution to women's rights in Iraq, Latif received the Vital Voices 15th Global Leadership Award for Human Rights. She was honored on 9 March 2016 during a ceremony held at the Kennedy Center in Washington DC. The award honored Latif together with three other activists: Hafsat Abiola-Costello, Akanksha Hazari and Yoani Sánchez.
