= Josephine Kulea =

Kenyan women's rights campaigner

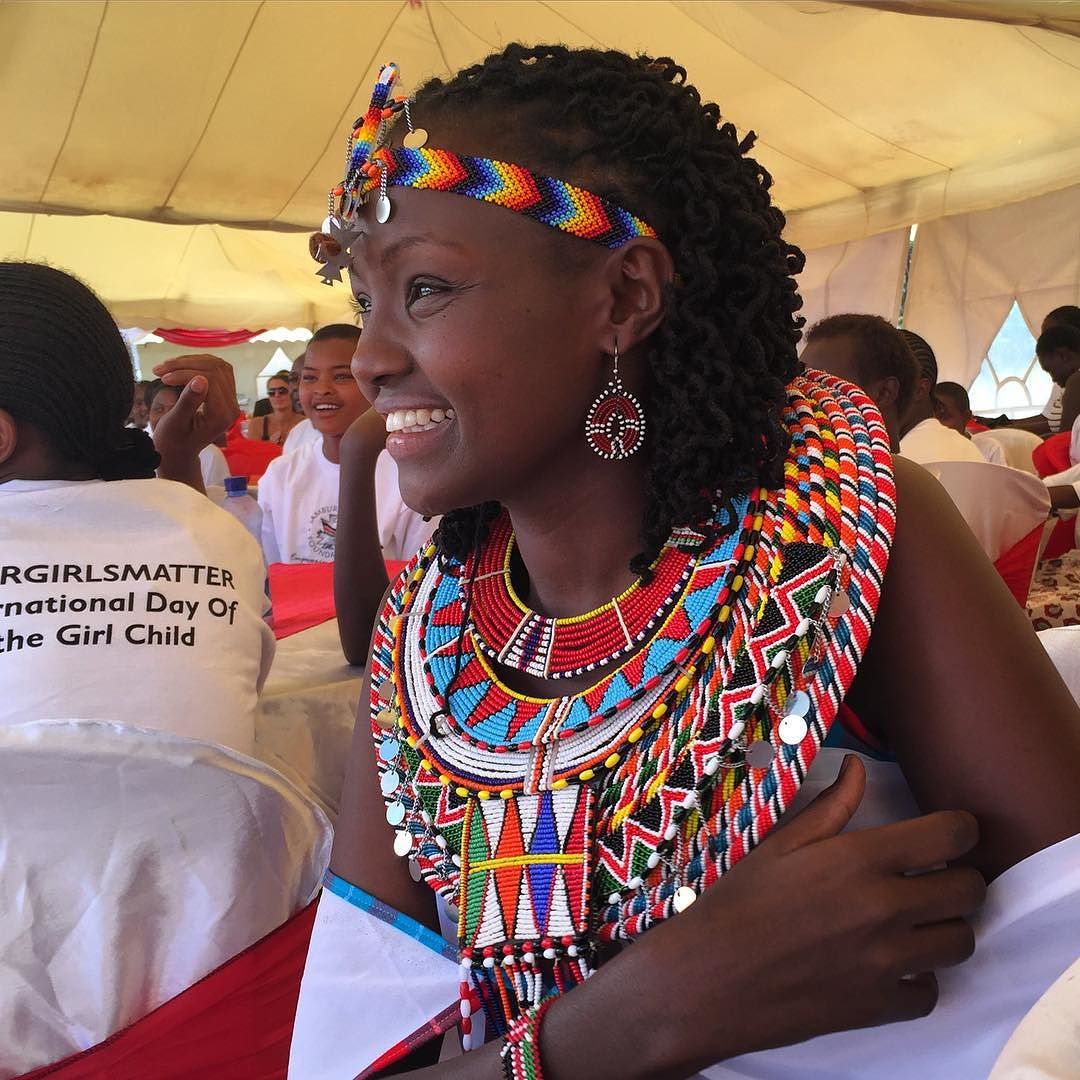
- Kulea in 2015
- Known for: Women's and children's rights campaigns

Josephine Kulea is a Kenyan women's rights campaigner. Rescued from female genital mutilation and forced marriage as a child, she has since set up the Samburu Girls Foundation, which has saved more than 1,000 girls from similar practices. Kulea was recognised as an "unsung heroine" by US ambassador to Kenya Michael Ranneberger in 2011.

== Life ==
Josephine Kulea grew up among the Samburu people in Kenya. The area has a tradition of "beading", whereby male relatives give young girls beaded necklaces, force them to undergo female genital mutilation (FGM), and then are able to have sex with them. Any children born from these arrangements are killed after birth. Kulea was saved from this practice and a child marriage by a local priest, and sent to boarding school in Meru, with the blessing of her parents. After her father died two years later, her uncles wished to force her to marry, but her mother refused and made sure she stayed at school. Kulea went on to attend a boarding secondary school and the Mathari Consolata Nursing School in Nyeri.

After graduating as a nurse, Kulea refused an arranged marriage to a businessman. Her nursing training taught her that FGM was not a usual practice, and that its use in Samburu did not accord with the situation in other communities. Kulea received funding in 2008 to help her to rescue other girls from Samburu, Laikipia, and Isiolo. One of the first rescues she carried out was of her two cousins, one of whom was to be married at the age of 10, and then her sister who, at the age of 7, had been made to replace her. She managed to have her uncles, who were behind the practice, arrested (FGM and child marriage were made illegal in Kenya in 2011).

Kulea founded the Samburu Girls Foundation in 2012, and by September of that year it had rescued 56 girls and helped to arrange their secondary education. Additionally, thirteen of the girls' babies had been placed into children's homes. Kulea works alongside the police and the wife of Samburu West MP Simeon Lesrima. She relies on a network of informants to let them know when illegal practices are taking place. She also hosts a radio programme to raise awareness of the illegal practices and inform people of her foundation. By the end of 2016, she is said to have saved more than 1,000 girls from FGM and forced marriage.

Kulea and the foundation are opposed by some politicians and churches, who are afraid of losing votes or members, and has been subject to threats and curses from community elders. Her favourite quote is: “When you educate a man, you educate an individual. When you educate a woman, you educate a nation.” by James Emman Kwegyir Aggrey.
