= Asuda =

Women's rights NGO in Iraqi Kurdistan

- Founded: 2001
- Type: Non-profit organization
- Purpose: Women free from violence and abuse
- Location(s): Sulaymaniyah, plus 2 sub offices in Erbil and Duhok
- Region served: Iraq, Kurdistan Region
- Services: Protection, Awareness, Research and Advocacy
- Method: Grants, Funding, campaigns
- Key people: Khanim Rahim Latif (executive director)
- Employees: 25
- Volunteers: 10
- Website: asuda.krd

Asuda for Combating Violence against Women is a women's rights NGO operating in Iraqi Kurdistan. The term Asuda means: "providing comfort".

== Focus ==
Asuda provides protection and support to victims of gender-based violence in Kurdistan (Iraq) as well as to women who have been forced to leave Iraqi Kurdistan regardless of their ethnicity and religion.

Asuda is a non-profit, non-governmental, non-affiliated organization based in Sulaymaniyah, Iraqi Kurdistan. Asuda is a member of NGOs Coordination Committee for Iraq (NCCI).

== Background ==
Asuda states that violence against women, notably honor killings, is a key social problem in Iraqi Kurdistan. Despite efforts from wider society to end the killings, the rate of violence is increasing. Respect for women and women's rights continue to be a controversial and sensitive issue. Honor killings are accepted within certain regional 'tribal' or customary laws.

== Objectives ==
- Eradication of gender discrimination and all forms of violence against women including female genital mutilation (FGM) in the Kurdish society.
- Breaking taboos of bringing up women's rights issues and influence the public opinion in favor of women's rights.
- Promoting awareness among the public about the negative consequences of violence against women.
- Reinforcing lobbying groups to amend relevant laws and legislation that are against the interests of women's rights, and that encourage violence against women and abuse of women's rights.

== Activities ==
Asuda undertakes:

- Protection: Providing shelter to hundreds of women, protection from facing gender-based violence, FGM, abuse, or honor killing threats. More women come to the center for mediation services, counseling, and/or legal aid.
- Public awareness: Asuda cooperates with police and authorities in order to increase their awareness about honor killings and violence against women. Asuda also seeks to educate the public by utilizing local media outlets, campaigns and seminars. Asuda publishes booklets and books on women's rights and violence as educational material.
- Research and monitoring: Asuda collects and compiles data and statistics on violence against women. Asuda intends to establish an online database collating statistics such as female fatalities due to suicide or deaths resulting from honor killings.
- Political lobbying: Asuda works closely with the Kurdistan Regional Government to influence the development of legal standards and improve laws to protect women. Asuda claims partial credit for placing women's rights as a Kurdish government's priority.

== Accomplishments ==
In 2000, Asuda opened the first women's shelter in the Kurdish region. Since then, Asuda has played an important role in lobbying the Iraqi Kurdistan government to place priority on women's rights. Today, Asuda continues to provide shelter, information, legal aid and mediation to women in need.

== Financial disclosure ==
Asuda is reliant on grants and donations from local, national, regional and international donors and organizations. These organizations include various agencies and programs of the United Nations, the European Union and governments worldwide. Asuda has received many grants from key international and regional organizations, embassies and ministries of foreign affairs of European Union and the United States.

== Controversy ==
Due to controversy about Asuda's work and some negative local community perception, Asuda has come under several direct and indirect threats and attacks. The most serious attack to date on Asuda occurred on May 11, 2008, when unknown gunmen opened fire on Asuda's main office in Sulaymaniyah, seriously injuring a woman inside.

== See also ==
- Rasan
