= Khalid Adem =

Ethiopian man convicted for FGM

- Born: 1975 (age 50–51); Addis Ababa, Ethiopia
- Known for: Female genital mutilation

Khalid Misri Adem (Amharic: ካሊድ አደም; born 1975) is an Ethiopian who was both the first person prosecuted and first person convicted for female genital mutilation (FGM) in the United States, stemming from charges that he had personally excised his 2-year-old daughter's clitoris with a pair of scissors.

== Arrest and charges ==
Adem, a Georgia gas-station clerk originally from Addis Ababa, Ethiopia, was arrested on March 28, 2003, and charged for aggravated battery and cruelty to children. Gwinnett County prosecutors alleged that in 2001 Adem had used a pair of scissors to remove the clitoris of his two-year-old daughter in the kitchen of the Duluth apartment Adem shared with his wife, Fortunate.

During the trial Adem's wife Fortunate testified: "He said he wanted to preserve her virginity … He said it was the will of God. I became angry in my mind. I thought he was crazy."

In Adem's native Ethiopia, while female genital mutilation (FGM) has been made illegal by the 2004 Penal Code, and is formally discouraged by the Ethiopian government, the practice remains a very common procedure, with the World Health Organization estimating the prevalence of FGM in the country in 2005 at 74.3%

== The trial ==
Adem denied he had excised his daughter's clitoris or asked anyone else to do it. His defense lawyer conceded that the girl had in fact had her clitoris removed, but implied that Fortunate Adem's family—immigrants from South Africa—might have been responsible.

Adem's lawyer argued that Fortunate's accusations were the result of the acrimonious divorce and custody battle the couple went through in 2003, during which Fortunate received sole custody of the girl. The fact that the crime had occurred in 2001 and yet was not reported by Fortunate until 2003 was used to suggest the accusation was spurious and vindictive, as the wound would have caused the child great pain and would have required constant cleaning.

Fortunate claimed she did not discover her daughter's amateur clitoridectomy until an argument with her husband in 2003 about the practice of female genital cutting, during which, according to Fortunate, Khalid Adem implied it had already occurred to their daughter. The two were divorced several months afterwards, and Fortunate was awarded sole custody of the girl.

Khalid claimed the reverse, that it was Fortunate who had revealed to him that their daughter had had her clitoris removed, and that she was falsely accusing him to obtain leverage for the custody battle.

Lawyers for the defense raised the question of why Adem, an urban Ethiopian who grew to adulthood in the United States, would have felt compelled to perform the cutting, especially since none of his immediate family (i.e. his sisters) are circumcised. Moreover, the operation in his native Ethiopia is virtually always performed by women. The defense also tried to cast doubt on the veracity of the testimony of Adem's daughter, who was two years old at the time of the incident, but was seven by the time she testified before the court. Defense attorney W. Mark Hill brought in psychologist Jack Farrar to raise the question of false memory. The fact of the clitoridectomy was not disputed by the defense. The prosecution's inability to identify the "second man" who allegedly helped Adem perform the operation was also used to imply the story was false.

== Conviction and public response ==
On November 2, 2006, Adem was convicted of aggravated battery and cruelty to children and sentenced to two terms of 15 years, concurrent, the first 10 years to be served in prison and the remaining five years on probation. He also received a fine in the amount of $5,000, with an additional $32 a month for a probation and supervision fee.

Prime minister of Ethiopia Meles Zenawi said, "If a whole community is involved in this practice, you cannot jail an entire community. You have to change the mindset, and that takes time."

Ben Koissaba, a leader of the Maasai of Kenya (who consider circumcision of males and females a part of their distinctive cultural heritage), was quoted by Reuters as saying, "If a woman is not cut, she remains a baby forever and cannot perform social rites with other women … [Adem] was doing it because he thought it would be a bad omen on his child if he did not. Maybe he should have been reprimanded, not jailed, but we should try to understand his culture."

== Legal changes ==
At the time of the crime, many states—including Georgia—had no laws on the books specifically addressing female genital cutting. After Adem's arrest, Representative Mary Margaret Oliver (D-Decatur), in collaboration with Fortunate Adem, was able to get a law passed specifically outlawing female genital cutting in the state of Georgia. It was enacted in 2005. Khalid Adem was however not tried under this law, as his actions occurred before it went into effect.

== Deportation ==
In March 2017, Adem was deported by U.S. Immigration and Customs Enforcement to his native Ethiopia, having served 10 years in prison.
