= Gishiri cutting =

Form of female genital mutilation

Gishiri or gishiri cutting is a form of female genital mutilation performed commonly by the Hausa-Fulani people of northern Nigeria and southern Niger. The procedure is believed by traditional practitioners to treat a variety of gynecologic ailments, although there is no scientific basis for this procedure, and it is considered pseudoscience.

== Etymology ==
The word "gishiri" is Hausa for "salt". It refers to the practice of Arab traders who still caravan across the Sahara to cities in northern parts of West Africa, such as Kano, Nigeria. When a customer buys a quantity of salt, the trader produces a long knife and cuts a piece off a large block; this knife is similar to the kind used to produce gishiri cuts.

== Procedure and risks ==
A whole range of gynecological complaints, including difficulty in labor, infertility, dyspareunia (pain during sex), pelvic organ prolapse and urinary retention, are believed to be caused by a vagina that is too narrow in these areas. The traditional treatment is to incise the vagina. A long knife is inserted into the vagina and backward cuts from the back of the vagina down into the perineum are made.

Serious injuries can result, such as fistulae: holes in the vaginal walls that separate it from the bladder or the rectum. Sometimes the knife is inserted down the urethra to make the cut, laying bare the entire lower urinary tract. Many women also die from hemorrhage which results from the procedure.

== See also ==
- Vulvectomy
