= Sahiyo =

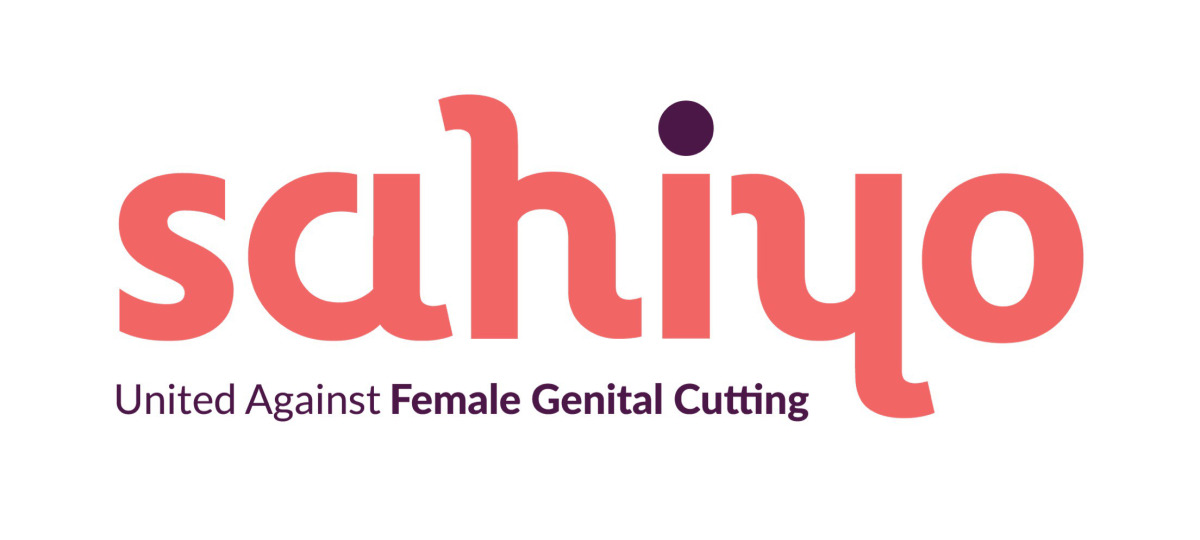
- Formation: 2015
- Purpose: Girls' and women's rights, human rights
- Location: Mumbai, India Massachusetts, USA
- Official languages: English, Gujarati, Hindi
- Website: https://sahiyo.org/

Sahiyo is a non-governmental organization founded in 2015, to advocate for girls' and women's rights and oppose the practice of female genital mutilation (FGM) in Asian communities, with a focus on the Dawoodi Bohra community in India.

== History ==
Sahiyo (the Bohra Gujarati word for 'saheliyo,' or friends) was founded in 2014 by five women: Mariya Taher, Aarefa Johari, Priya Goswami, Insia Dariwala, and Shaheeda Tavawalla-Kirtane, who strongly opposed the ritual of 'khatna' or female genital cutting (FGC) in the Dawoodi Bohra community. Sahiyo partnered with national and international NGOs such as German-Iraqi NGO Wadi, WeSpeakOut, Orchid Project, Tostan, and Breakthrough. In December 2015, the organization was officially established.

In 2017, Sahiyo produced a report of female circumcision being practiced in the Dawoodi Bohra community, as well as by other Muslim sects. In November of the same year, Sahiyo attended the European Forum to Build Bridges on FGM to encourage transnational cross-border cooperation on opposing FGC globally.

From 19 to 21 January 2018, Sahiyo hosted the first annual U.S. Dawoodi Bohra Anti-Female Genital Cutting Activist Retreat in the United States and India. Its purpose was to allow activists to share their experiences and build solidarity. Sahiyo was recognized by the Population Reference Bureau as one of "six inspiring organizations" working to fight FGC. In September 2018, Sahiyo founder Aarefa Johari and Aysha Mahmood won the 2017 Laadli Media and Advertising Award for Gender Sensitivity for their work on Sahiyo's investigative report on the prevalence of FGC in Kerala.

In 2019, Sahiyo established a U.S. Advisory Board to guide its organizational direction. In February 2019, Sahiyo investigators found a clinic in Kozhikode that practiced FGM. In March, Sahiyo hosted its second annual Activists' Retreat, both in Mumbai and in New York, for women concerned about FGC in the Bohra community. That same year, Sahiyo was one of three winners in the ViiV Healthcare #EndFGM Positive Action Challenge, which supports innovative interventions to end FGC. From 16 to 19 March, Mariya Taher represented Sahiyo at the Women Deliver 2019 Conference in Copenhagen, Denmark, where she spoke on a panel highlighting the prevalence of FGM globally, speaking specifically about the Dawoodi Bohra community both in India and across the world. For the first time, a pre-conference on FGM was held on 2 June, the day before the conference began.

On 13 June, Sahiyo organized a roundtable of around 60 experts from different disciplines and cultural groups to launch a Massachusetts End FGM/C Network, to raise awareness of the issue and to share knowledge and resources. The event was co-sponsored by the Muslim American Leadership Alliance (MALA), Tostan International, MassNOW, Lesley University, the U.S. End FGM/C Network, and the Women's Bar Association of Massachusetts. On 8 December, Sahiyo became a partner of FemmeCon, an Indian women's health festival organized by TheaCare, an interactive multimedia knowledge platform for information about women's health.

On February 1, 2020, Sahiyo spoke on FGM at the 63rd annual conference of Obstetricians and Gynecologists (AICOG), in Lucknow, India. In April, due to COVID-19, Sahiyo hosted its third annual Activists' Retreat online. On 16 April, Sahiyo co-founder Aarefa partnered with StoryCenter's Silence Speaks program to offer an online platform where South Asian women could share their personal stories and cultivate a virtual community. On 21 April, Sahiyo partnered with API-GBV and U.S. End FGM/C Network for an educational webinar focusing on FGM in the United States, its connection to the broader anti-gender-based violence movement, and anti-FGM community activism in the United States. In May, Sahiyo held a COVID-19 storytelling session for Voices to End FGM/C, to continue developing an online community for workshop alumni and survivors. On 13 June, Sahiyo co-founder Priya Goswami gave a keynote speech, "Bringing Change through an On-ground Movement," at Intesaab Fest 2020, a student-run online festival in India. Voices to End FGM/C alumna Mariam Sabir's presentation on Sahiyo's storytelling workshop was selected for virtual display at the July 2020 AAFP National Conference of Family Medicine Residents and Medical Students. In October, one of the Voices to End FGM/C videos received an honorable mention from the Sunhak Peace Prize at the Peace Motion Graphics Contest. Mariya Taher of Sahiyo U.S. received a Crave Foundation for Women grant in recognition of her work against FGC. On 30 July, Sahiyo joined the Global Woman P.E.A.C.E. Foundation and the Council of the Great City Schools to host the webinar "Learning about Female Genital Mutilation/Cutting (FGM/C) in the Classroom: The Importance of Nationwide Education as a Tool for Prevention".

On 26 February 2021, Sahiyo launched Bhaiyo, an organization for men who oppose FGC. Bhaiyo hosts online webinars, town halls, and community education events; creates international relationships in the form of exchange/mission trips to build knowledge of anti-FGC activism; and raises awareness of the issue. In March, Sahiyo co-hosted a parallel session and organized the United Nations' Virtual 65th Commission on the Status of Women, where they introduced their Voices to End FGM/C project.

From 14 January to 25 February 2022, StoryCenter and Sahiyo hosted the sixth annual Voices to End FGM/C digital storytelling workshop virtually. Sahiyo also launched the Critical Intersections research project, which investigates how FGC survivors and activists have often encountered racist narratives and/or other critical oppressive intersections in their work and their recovery. On 20 January, Sahiyo India held a webinar, "How to Stop the Rising Trend of Medicalisation of Female Genital Cutting in Asia". On 1 February, CARE Atlanta Global Innovation Hub hosted a webinar on reproductive rights and justice, with Sahiyo's U.S. Executive Director Mariya Taher as a guest speaker talking about FGC in the U.S. On 6 February, Sahiyo hosted the second Sahiyo Discusses club with author Shabnam Samuel about her memoir, A Fractured Life. On the same day, Sahiyo launched the social media campaign, Each Bhaiyo, Reach Bhaiyo, with the goal of increasing recruitment of male allies to join Bhaiyo. On 14 March, Sahiyo partnered with the Global Platform at the 66th NGO Commission on the Status of Women to host a webinar called "Engaging Men to End Female Genital Mutilation/Cutting."
