= Michael White (judge) =

Irish judge and solicitor (born 1953)

Judge of the High Court
- In office 24 October 2011 – 1 October 2021
- Nominated by: Government of Ireland
- Appointed by: Mary McAleese

Judge of the Circuit Court
- In office 21 April 1996 – 24 October 2011
- Nominated by: Government of Ireland
- Appointed by: Mary Robinson

Personal details
- Born: 1953 (age 72–73) Carndonagh, County Donegal, Ireland
- Spouse(s): Maud McKee (m. 1982; d. 2014)
- Children: 4
- Education: University College Dublin; Law Society of Ireland

Michael White (born 1953) is a retired Irish judge who served as a Judge of the High Court from 2011 to 2021 and a Judge of the Circuit Court from 1996 to 2011.

== Early life ==
White was born in Carndonagh, County Donegal, 1953. His father Michael was a solicitor. He attended St Patrick's Boys' National School, Carndonagh Boys Secondary School and Gormanston College. He graduated with a degree in law from University College Dublin in 1973. He engaged in socialist activism during his time in university and joined the Workers' Party.

== Legal and political career ==
He qualified as a solicitor in 1975. He contested three general elections and one by-election in the Dublin Central constituency between 1981 and 1983 for the Workers' Party.

He set up a law firm with Pat McCartan and Paula Scully in 1976, before setting up his own practice in 1987. He later specialised in family law and labour law. He represented future Tánaiste Eamon Gilmore in a land dispute during his career as a solicitor.

== Judicial career ==
He was appointed to the Circuit Court in 1996, one of the first three solicitors to be appointed to judicial office. In the Circuit Court, he sentenced George Redmond following findings by the Flood Tribunal. He presided over the trial surrounding the death of Brian Murphy, which influenced the fictional novel Bad Day in Blackrock and its film adaptation What Richard Did.

He was appointed to the High Court through application to the Judicial Appointments Advisory Board in October 2011. He is the chair of the Hammond Lane Project Board for the development of a new courthouse in Dublin. He publicly criticised the procedures and administration of the Irish family law courts in 2018.

White was the judge in Charge of the Central Criminal Court.

In February 2021, he was appointed as the inaugural chairperson of the Parole Board and in June 2021 and took over as the chairperson of a Commission of Investigation into allegations of sexual abuse made against Bill Kenneally.

He retired as a High Court judge on 1 October 2021.

== Personal life ==
White lives in Dublin. He married Maud McKee in 1982, a doctor originally from Portballintrae, with whom he had four sons. Dr. McKee died in 2014.
