= John Harbison (pathologist) =

First State Pathologist of Ireland (1935–2020)

- Born: 23 December 1935; Howth, Ireland
- Died: 18 December 2020 (aged 84)
- Education: Trinity College Dublin
- Known for: State Pathologist for Ireland
- Medical career
- Profession: pathologist, academic
- Sub-specialties: forensic pathology

John Harbison (23 December 1935 – 18 December 2020) was the second State Pathologist of Ireland.

== Early life and education ==
Harbison was born in the Howth area to Sheelagh Harbison and her husband Dr James Augustine Harbison, educated locally, and at St Gerard's School, Bray and Stonyhurst College, and subsequently graduated from Trinity College Dublin in 1960. His father was a doctor, who had held roles as county and city medical officer. His brother Peter Harbison was an archaeologist and author.

== Career ==
He worked at Our Lady's Hospital for Sick Children and held positions in hospitals in Bristol and Oxford before becoming an assistant pathologist in TCD. He was a lecturer in medical jurisprudence in TCD and became the second state pathologist in 1974, succeeding Maurice Hickey.

He worked on cases including the Kerry babies, Sophie Toscan du Plantier, Stardust, Brian Murphy and Grangegorman, carrying out around 100 post mortems a year. In 1991 he was appointed Professor of Forensic Medicine and Toxicology at the Royal College of Surgeons. He ceased performing post mortems in 2003, at the age of 67. In 2006 health issues prevented him from giving testimony in court cases.

He was succeeded as State Pathologist by Professor Marie Cassidy.

== Personal life ==
Harbison was married to Kathleen Harbison in 1979, and they had two children and two grandchildren. He and his family used to live at Innisbeg in Howth.

He died on 18 December 2020, just five days before his 85th birthday. His funeral took place at Glasnevin Crematorium on 21 December 2020.
