= Toscan du Plantier =

Toscan du Plantier is a surname. Notable people with the surname include:

- Daniel Toscan du Plantier (1941–2003), French film producer
- Sophie Toscan du Plantier (1957–1996), French TV producer, murdered in Ireland
