= TD v Minister for Justice Equality and Law Reform =

Supreme Court of Ireland case

T.D. v Minister for Justice Equality and Law Reform
- Coat of arms of Ireland
- Court: Supreme Court of Ireland
- Decided: 10 April 2014
- Citation: [2014] IESC 29

Case history
- Appealed from: High Court
- Appealed to: Supreme Court

Court membership
- Judges sitting: Denham C.J., Murray J., Fennelly J., O'Donnell J., McKechnie J.

Case opinions
- An inherent element of State sovereignty over national territory is to have very wide powers in the interest of the common good to control aliens, their entry into the State, their departure and activities within the State. This comes with a certain procedural autonomy.
- Decision by: Murray J.

Keywords
- EU law; Judicial Review; Principle of Effectiveness; Principle of Equivalence; Time Limit

T.D. v Minister for Justice Equality and Law Reform [2014] IESC 29; [2014] 4 IR 277 is a reported Irish Supreme Court case decision where the court considered whether Section 5(2) of the Illegal Immigrants (Trafficking) Act 2000 was compatible with the principles of equivalence and effectiveness under EU law. Ultimately, the Supreme Court dismissed this argument.

== Background ==
The respondents (defendants) were South African. In April 2009, the first respondent and her children (the second and third named respondents) requested asylum in the State of Ireland. The children, were included in her asylum application without a separate investigation into their claims.

The Refugee Legal Service made sure that the first person named as a respondent could obtain legal advice from the start of her asylum application. The first named respondent received a letter on May 6, 2009, telling her that "the Commissioner" (i.e. the Office of the Refugee Applications Commissioner) had decided not to consider her and her children refugees. The respondents claimed they had been victims of racial persecution. However, their claims were rejected because they lacked credibility.

When the respondents received the rejection, they filed a Notice of Appeal against the commissioner's decision. This did not work because the Refugee Appeals Tribunal agreed with what the Commissioner said. The tribunal came to the conclusion that the applicants' claim for asylum was neither plausible nor credible. On August 29, 2009, the Minister for Justice, Equality, and Law Reform told the respondents that their request to be a refugee had been turned down and that it was thought they should be deported. After that, the respondents applied for secondary protection to make sure that they would not be sent back to their home countries. But this was turned down by the Minister. The deportation orders were sent out on March 9, 2010.

On April 1, 2010, the respondents began the process of judicial review. The respondents challenged the order to deport them and the decisions the Minister had made in the past not to give them refugee status. As the High Court Judge, Hogan J., pointed out, the problem was that the review application was sent after the 14-day limit set by Section 5 of the Illegal Immigrants (Trafficking) Act of 2000.

Concerning the 14-day deadline, the High Court judge said that even though the respondents had asked for more time, they had not given a good reason why the review of their application had taken so long. After noticing the delay, the High Court Judge looked into "whether the time limit provided in section 5 of the Act 2000 was compatible with the principles of effectiveness and equivalence of European Union law". If it was compatible, the respondents could have used their rights under EU law in the national courts, because EU law takes precedence over national law.

The High Court judge decided that the time limit was strict and, because of that, it was incompatible with the principles of equivalence and effectiveness of Union law. Even though there was a long delay, he allowed the respondents' request for judicial review to be considered.

The High Court judge let the Minister of Justice and Law Reform appeal the High Court's decision because he thought the issue was of "exceptional public importance". In this case, the Minister is appealing Hogan J. of the High Court's ruling, allowing the respondents to request a judicial review of a decision the Minister made.

== Holding of the Supreme Court ==
The Supreme Court ruled unanimously that Section 5(2) of the Illegal Immigrants (Trafficking) Act 2000 did not violate the principle of effectiveness or the principle of equivalence (by majority, with Murray J. dissenting) under EU law.

=== The Relationship between national procedural rules and EU Law ===
EU law is a part of the domestic law of each member state. Rights arising from EU law may be invoked before national courts. But domestic courts have a certain amount of "procedural autonomy". The two equivalence and effectiveness principles which were considered in this case place restrictions on this procedural autonomy.

==== The Principle of Equivalence ====
This Principle demands that national procedural law be applied without distinction, meaning it must be used the same way for everyone. In similar proceedings, national procedural law must not treat the protection of rights under EU law less favourably than the protection of rights under national law. National procedural law must work the same way for rights that are derived from national law and those that come from EU law.

==== The Principle of Effectiveness ====
The Principle of Effectiveness says that even if national procedural laws are in line with the Principle of Equivalence, they cannot make it excessively difficult or impossible to claim rights under EU law.

=== Supreme Court's deliberations ===
The court consisted of Denham C.J., Murray J., Fennelly J., O'Donnell J., and McKechnie J.

Concerning the principle of effectiveness, the court said that the respondents had access to professional legal advice throughout the whole process of their different applications. The respondents had failed to notify that there was some particular difficulty preventing them from initiating judicial review procedures earlier than they did or within the fourteen day period.

In this case, the principle of equivalence was used to look at how much control a state has over aliens (immigrants, refugees) entering or remaining in its territory.

For the common good, the state must have broad powers to control aliens' arrival, departure, and behaviour. This statement expresses state sovereignty over national territory, which is recognised in domestic and international law. The Supreme Court decided that the equivalence principle was based on how the state handled the entry of aliens into a new territory. There is a time limit that needs to be considered. Regardless of whether national or EU law supports a claim, this is true. Hence, the equivalence principle was not breached.

Since there were no questions about how EU law should be interpreted that needed to be answered, the case was not sent to the Court of Justice of the European Union. The Supreme Court also said that it was up to the national court to decide if its own rules went against the principles of equivalence. It was decided that only the national court can fully understand how its rules work in the context of the state system.

=== Decision ===
The judgement was delivered by Murray J.

The Supreme Court decided that Section 5(2) of the Illegal Immigrants (Trafficking) Act 2000 supported and was in line with the principles of equivalence and effectiveness in EU law. The respondents' request for a court review was rejected.
