= Cork West =

Cork West may refer to:

- West Cork (UK Parliament constituency)
- West Cork (podcast)
- Cork West (Dáil constituency) (1923–1969)

== See also ==
- West Cork
