= Dublin Central by-election =

Dublin Central by-election may refer to several by-elections in Dublin, Ireland:

- 1983 Dublin Central by-election, following the death of George Colley
- 2009 Dublin Central by-election, following the death of Tony Gregory
- 2026 Dublin Central by-election, following the resignation of Paschal Donohoe

== See also ==
- Category:Dáil by-elections
