= Death of Brian Murphy =

2000 killing in Dublin, Ireland

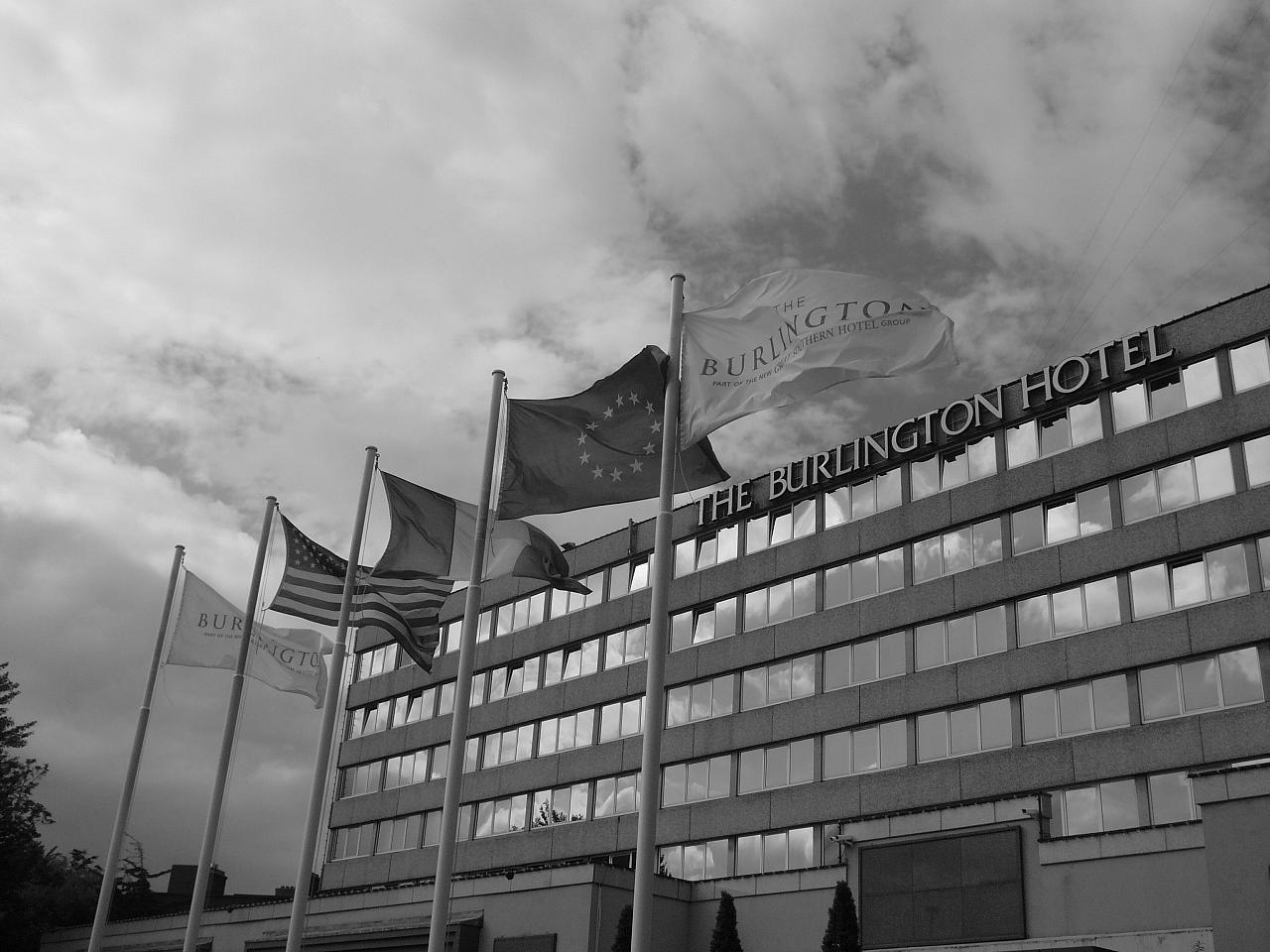
- The Burlington Hotel, outside which Murphy was killed, pictured in 2008.
- Date: 31 August 2000
- Location: Sussex Road, Dublin 2, Ireland; 53.329936°N 6.249325°W
- Also known as: Club Anabel case
- Inquest: Unlawful killing
- Coroner: Brian Farrell
- Accused: Dermot Laide; Sean Mackey; Desmond Ryan; Andrew Frame
- Charges: Manslaughter, violent disorder
- Convictions: Laide: manslaughter (overturned on appeal), violent disorder Mackey: violent disorder Ryan: violent disorder (overturned on appeal)

Club Anabel (Central Dublin)

In the early hours of 31 August 2000, Brian Murphy, an 18-year-old student, was attacked by a large group of young men outside the Club Anabel nightclub at the Burlington Hotel in Dublin, Ireland. He died shortly after the attack. The subsequent investigations drew great media interest, with the incident commonly referred to as the Club Anabel case.

Four men were charged with manslaughter and violent disorder regarding the death, which went to criminal trial in 2004: one was found not guilty on all charges; two were found guilty of violent disorder (although one of the two convictions was overturned on appeal); and one was found guilty of manslaughter and violent disorder, with the manslaughter conviction overturned on appeal in 2005. No other individuals were ever charged. A coroner's court inquest returned a verdict of unlawful killing in 2007.

== Early life ==
Brian Murphy
- Born: 1981; Dublin, Ireland
- Died: 31 August 2000 (aged 18–19); Ballsbridge, Dublin, Ireland
- Cause of death: Cerebral oedema, asphyxiation
- Occupation: Student
- Known for: Victim of unlawful killing
- Parent(s): Denis Murphy (father); Mary Murphy (mother)

Brian Murphy was born in Dublin, Ireland, to Denis and Mary Murphy and lived in Clonskeagh. In the summer of 2000 he had completed his Leaving Certificate exams and had a part-time job at the Brown Thomas department store; he had previously attended St Conleth's College, Gonzaga College and Bruce College (a grinds school).

== Death ==
On 30 August 2000, Murphy visited The Sports Bar at University College Dublin (UCD), with a friend, Matthew Moran, before they both travelled by bus to Leeson Street to spend the evening at Club Anabel in the nearby Burlington Hotel, where a friend who worked as a barman had promised them swift entry. A "students' night" was in progress with special drinks promotions. During the evening, Murphy mentioned to a female friend that he expected to be beaten up that night by "some boys" he had seen earlier, due to a row over an ex-girlfriend. As the club was closing, Murphy left the premises in the early hours of the next morning with a group of friends by the side entrance onto Sussex Road. The group smoked outside for some time and engaged in acts of horseplay, including stealing the shoes of a girl who was seated at the kerbside, and grabbing a carton of milk from a passing milk float.

A fracas broke out outside the hotel between 2:30 am and 3:00 am involving Murphy and a number of others, during which Murphy became surrounded by several men (possibly up to 10 individuals in two different groups) who punched him a number of times and who then kicked him repeatedly after he fell to the ground for up to 30 seconds. The fracas lasted no more than five minutes from start to finish. Friends attended to him immediately, finding him unconscious and carrying him across the road, and an ambulance was summoned at 3:11 am. He was brought to the emergency department at St Vincent's University Hospital at 3:35 am, and was subsequently pronounced dead at 4:57 am.

A post mortem examination by the state pathologist, John Harbison, found the cause of death to be cerebral oedema and inhalation of blood due to multiple facial injuries consistent with a significant assault.

== Trial ==
An intensive Garda Síochána investigation followed the incident, culminating in four young men being charged with his killing and causing violent disorder. Although there were around 50 witnesses to the incident, the investigation was frustrated by many witnesses giving incomplete evidence or contradictory, confusing statements, meaning that charges could not be brought against other individuals who were involved in the case. The month-long trial in 2004 attracted huge media interest because of the defendants’ privileged backgrounds; all four had finished secondary school studies more than a year previously at the fee-paying Blackrock College, and the majority of witnesses present on the night were similarly from overlapping social, school, university or sports circles in Dublin's Southside. This contrasted with other high-profile violent incidents at the time, which had mostly involved those at the margins of Irish society.

The defendants – Dermot Laide, Andrew Frame, Seán Mackey and Desmond Ryan – were all charged with manslaughter and violent disorder. Frame was found to be not guilty of either charge; Ryan was initially found guilty of violent disorder, but with the conviction being subsequently overturned on appeal; Mackey was convicted for violent disorder; and Laide was initially found guilty of both violent disorder and manslaughter, but with the manslaughter conviction later being overturned on appeal. A retrial was ordered in Laide's case over the manslaughter charge, but in 2006 a nolle prosequi (no prosecution) was entered by the State due to "ongoing evidential difficulties". By this time the incumbent state pathologist, Marie Cassidy, had made a new statement which conflicted with the autopsy report by her predecessor, John Harbison, and Harbison was now unable to give further evidence due to an illness affecting his lucidity.

== Inquest ==
The inquest into the case concluded in 2007 with a jury at Dublin City Coroner's Court unanimously determining the death to be the result of unlawful killing secondary to head injuries.

== In popular culture ==
Writer Kevin Power won the Rooney Prize for Irish Literature for his 2009 début novel Bad Day in Blackrock, inspired in part by the Murphy incident. The book was adapted for film in 2012 as What Richard Did, which was directed by Lenny Abrahamson and won five awards at the 10th Irish Film & Television Awards in 2013.
