= Sophie: A Murder in West Cork =

- Genre: Documentary
- Starring: Ian Bailey; Barry Roche; Eugene Gilligan
- Country of origin: Ireland
- Original languages: English; French
- No. of seasons: 1
- No. of episodes: 3

Production
- Running time: 49–64 minutes

Original release
- Network: Netflix
- Release: 30 June 2021

Sophie: A Murder in West Cork is a 2021 docuseries about the death of Sophie Toscan du Plantier, released on Netflix on 30 June 2021. It features Ian Bailey, Barry Roche and Eugene Gilligan.

== Cast ==
- Ian Bailey
- Barry Roche
- Eugene Gilligan
- Bertrand Bouniol
- Marie Madeleine Opalka
- Peter Bielecki
- Len Lipitch
- Elizabeth Wassell
- Dermot Dwyer
- Pierre-Louis Baudey-Vignaud
- Frédéric Gazeau
- Florence Newman
- Daniel Caron
- Lara Marlowe
- Diane Martin
- Denis Quinlan
- Agnès Thomas
- Michael Sheridan

== Episodes ==
No.	Title	Original release date
1	"The World Turned Upside Down"	30 June 2021
2	"The Suspect"	30 June 2021
3	"Justice"	30 June 2021
