= Marie Cassidy =

Pathologist, professor of forensic medicine

- Born: 1955 (age 70–71); Rutherglen, Scotland
- Education: University of Glasgow
- Known for: first full-time female forensic pathologist in the UK first female State Pathologist for Ireland
- Medical career
- Profession: pathologist, academic
- Sub-specialties: forensic pathology

Marie Therese Jane Cassidy (born 1955) is a pathologist, academic and former contestant on Dancing with the Stars Ireland. From 2004 to 2018 she was State Pathologist of Ireland, the first woman to hold the position. She is Professor of Forensic Medicine at the Royal College of Surgeons of Ireland and Trinity College, Dublin.

== Early life and education ==
Marie Cassidy was born in 1955 in Rutherglen and raised in Wishaw, both in Lanarkshire, Scotland. She is the granddaughter of emigrants from County Donegal. She lives in London and is married with two children.

Cassidy studied medicine at the University of Glasgow, graduating in January 1978, having been drawn to the field due to cardiac illnesses suffered by her father, who died when she was 15.

== Career ==
She became a member of the Royal College of Pathologists in 1985 and a forensic pathologist the same year, making her the first female full-time forensic pathologist in the United Kingdom.

She held a professorship of forensic medicine at the University of Glasgow before moving to Ireland in 1998 to take up the position of Deputy State Pathologist. She was appointed to the position of State Pathologist in January 2004, succeeding Professor John Harbison to become the first female State Pathologist in Ireland.

She is also Professor of Forensic Medicine at the Royal College of Surgeons of Ireland and Trinity College, Dublin.

Cassidy has also worked as a consultant for the United Nations, helping to identify the remains of victims of war crimes in Bosnia.

Cassidy announced her intended retirement as State Pathologist of Ireland on 7 September 2018.

She has acted as a consultant to the television crime series Taggart. She also advised Irish crime writer Alex Barclay.

A character in the book The Human Body is based on her.

== Media career ==
Since retiring as state pathologist in 2018, Cassidy has fronted series for RTÉ including Dr. Cassidy's Casebook where she revisited some of the most memorable investigations of her career. In August 2022, she took part in the documentary Cold Case Collins, a retrospective look at the assassination of Irish revolutionary, Michael Collins on the hundredth anniversary of his death.

In January 2023, Cassidy appeared on the sixth series of Dancing with the Stars Ireland. She was partnered with Stephen Vincent and was eliminated 2nd overall in week 4, finishing in 10th place.

== See also ==
- List of pathologists
