= 1983 Dublin Central by-election =

By-election to the 24th Dáil

- 23 November 1983
- Turnout: 32,704 (46.5%)
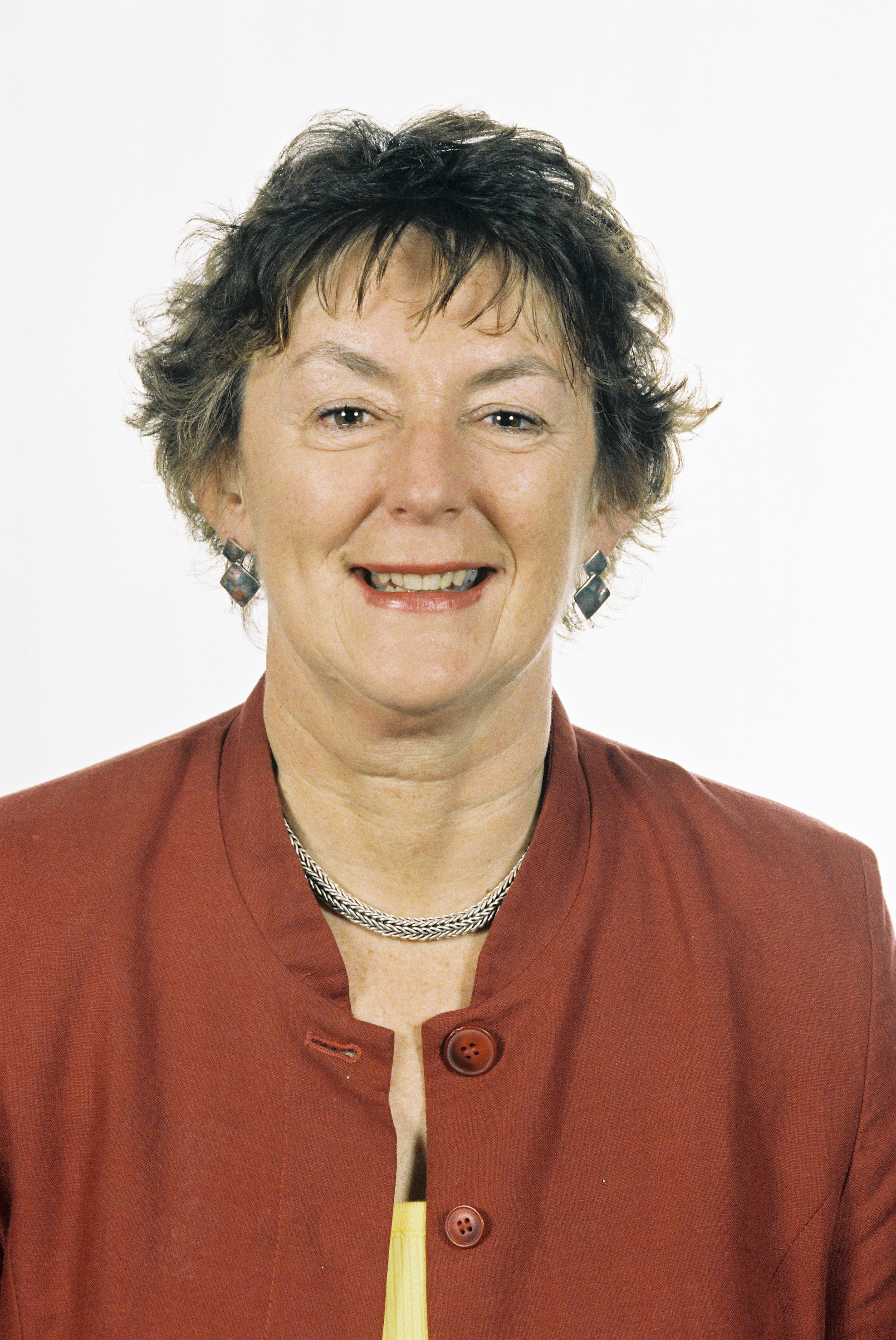
	Leonard		White
Nominee	Tom Leonard	Mary Banotti	Michael White
Party	Fianna Fáil	Fine Gael	Workers' Party
First preferences	15,236	7,362	4,342
Percentage	46.6%	22.5%	13.3%
Final count	16,439	8,623	6,284
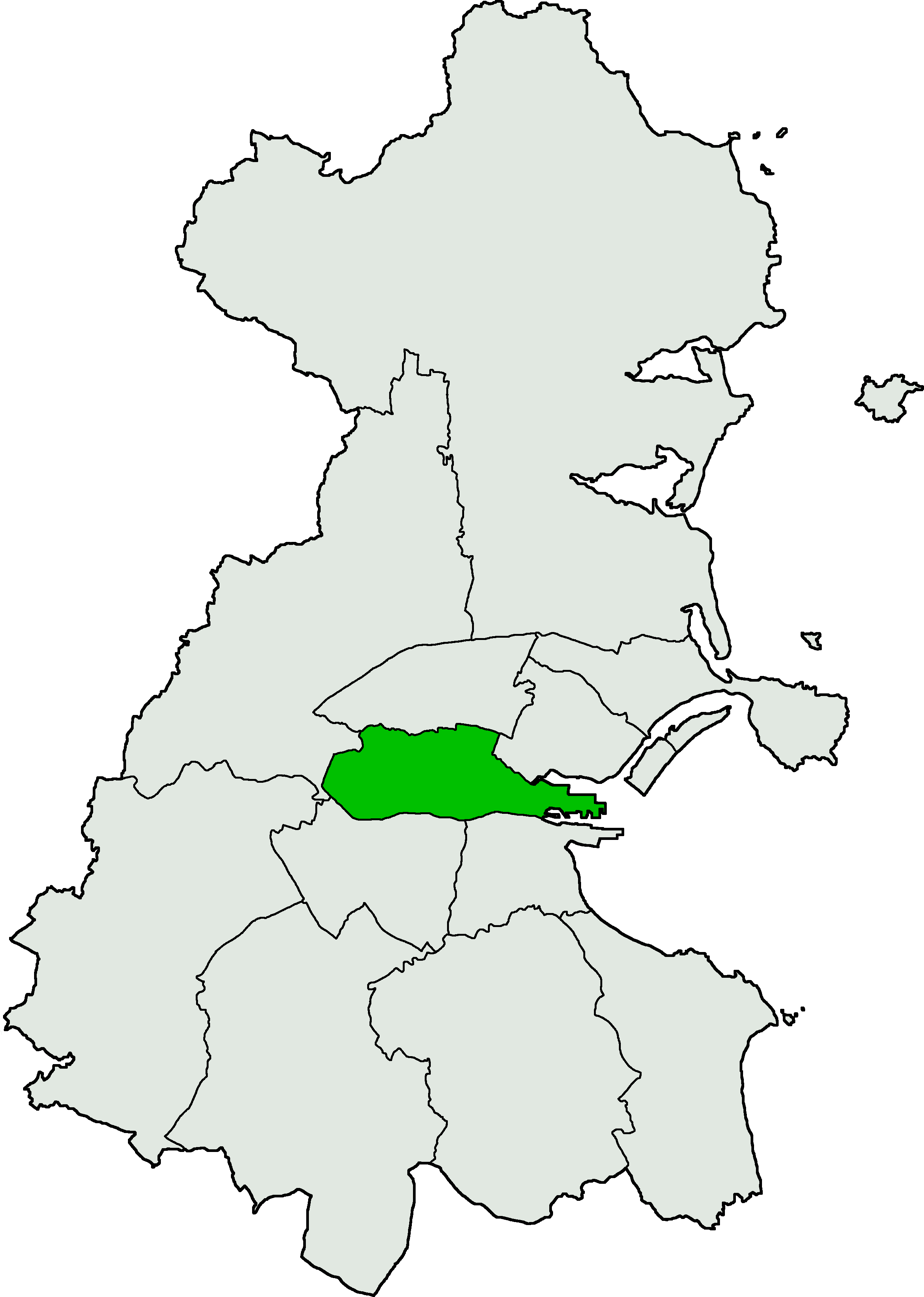
- Dublin Central shown within County Dublin
TD before election
George Colley
Fianna Fáil
TD after election
Tom Leonard
Fianna Fáil

A Dáil by-election was held in the constituency of Dublin Central in Ireland on Wednesday, 23 November 1983, to fill a vacancy in the 24th Dáil. It followed the death of Fianna Fáil Teachta Dála (TD) George Colley on 17 September 1983.

The writ of election was moved by Fianna Fáil TD Bertie Ahern on 2 November and was agreed by the Dáil.

The by-election was won by the Fianna Fáil candidate Tom Leonard.

The runner-up, Mary Banotti was elected to the European Parliament in 1984.

== Result ==
1983 Dublin Central by-election
Party	Candidate	FPv%	Count							
Party	Candidate	FPv%	1	2	3	4	5	6	7	8
Fianna Fáil	Tom Leonard	46.6	15,236	15,240	15,273	15,289	15,343	15,449	15,795	16,439
Fine Gael	Mary Banotti	22.5	7,362	7,373	7,400	7,411	7,504	7,668	8,446	8,623
Workers' Party	Michael White	13.3	4,342	4,358	4,373	4,472	4,594	4,743	5,274	6,284
Sinn Féin	Christy Burke	7.1	2,304	2,307	2,313	2,373	2,407	2,444	2,566	
Labour	Jimmy Somers	6.0	1,966	1,970	1,977	1,997	2,044	2,122		
Independent	Leo Armstrong	1.8	574	580	602	608	700			
Independent	Anthony Ryan	1.4	458	468	487	503				
Communist	Edward Glackin	0.7	243	244	247					
Independent	William Foley	0.5	147	153						
Independent	Jim Tallon	0.2	72							
Electorate: 70,403 Valid: 32,704 Quota: 16,353 Turnout: 46.5%
