= Tom Leonard (Irish politician) =

Irish politician (1924–2004)

Teachta Dála
- In office November 1983 – February 1987
- Constituency: Dublin Central
- In office June 1977 – June 1981
- Constituency: Dublin Cabra

Personal details
- Born: 30 May 1924 Dublin, Ireland
- Died: 5 March 2004 (aged 79) Dublin, Ireland
- Party: Fianna Fáil

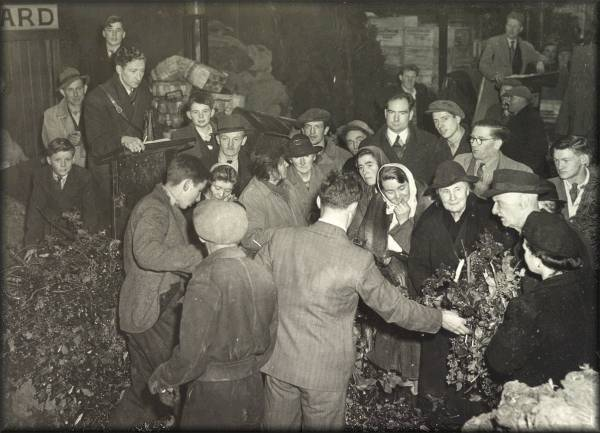
Tom Leonard (on the podium, left) Christmas 1949, auctioning holly wreaths in the Dublin Fruit and Vegetable Markets.

Thomas Leonard (30 May 1924 – 5 March 2004) was an Irish Fianna Fáil politician.

== Biography ==
Leonard was born in Dublin, and worked much of his life in a family business in the Dublin Corporation Wholesale Fruit and Vegetable Markets. The business had been started two generations earlier by his grandmother, continued by his father and ultimately passed to Leonard and his two brothers. While in business, Leonard was also a Dublin City Councillor.

He was a Fianna Fáil candidate at the 1969 and 1973 general elections. He was first elected to Dáil Éireann as a TD for Dublin Cabra at the 1977 general election.

At the end of his first term in office, Leonard's constituency was abolished and became part of the new Dublin Central constituency. He stood there at the 1981 general election, but lost his seat; he was also an unsuccessful candidate there at the February 1982 and November 1982 general elections. Leonard when he won the November 1983 by-election for Dublin Central following the death of George Colley.

During this tenure, he was appointed by the party leader and former Taoiseach Charles Haughey to the New Ireland Forum.

Leonard was unsuccessful at the 1985 Dublin Corporation election. Unusually for a sitting TD, he was not selected by Fianna Fáil to contest the 1987 general election, losing out to John Stafford and Dermot Fitzpatrick. Leonard graciously accepted the party decision which ended his Dáil career and went back to being a city councillor.

He continued in the markets until his retirement, and died in Blanchardstown, Dublin in 2004.

Dáil	Election	Deputy (Party)	Deputy (Party)	Deputy (Party)
21st	1977	Tom Leonard (FF)	Vivion de Valera (FF)	Hugh Byrne (FG)
22nd	1981	Constituency abolished		

Dáil	Election	Deputy (Party)	Deputy (Party)	Deputy (Party)	Deputy (Party)
19th	1969	Frank Cluskey (Lab)	Vivion de Valera (FF)	Thomas J. Fitzpatrick (FF)	Maurice E. Dockrell (FG)
20th	1973	Frank Cluskey (Lab)	Vivion de Valera (FF)	Thomas J. Fitzpatrick (FF)	Maurice E. Dockrell (FG)
21st	1977	Constituency abolished			

Dáil	Election	Deputy (Party)	Deputy (Party)	Deputy (Party)	Deputy (Party)	Deputy (Party)
22nd	1981	Bertie Ahern (FF)	Michael Keating (FG)	Alice Glenn (FG)	Michael O'Leary (Lab)	George Colley (FF)
23rd	1982 (Feb)	Bertie Ahern (FF)	Michael Keating (FG)	Tony Gregory (Ind.)	Michael O'Leary (Lab)	George Colley (FF)
24th	1982 (Nov)	Bertie Ahern (FF)	Michael Keating (FG)	Tony Gregory (Ind.)	Alice Glenn (FG)	George Colley (FF)
24th	1983 by-election	Bertie Ahern (FF)	Michael Keating (FG)	Tony Gregory (Ind.)	Alice Glenn (FG)	Tom Leonard (FF)
25th	1987	Bertie Ahern (FF)	Michael Keating (PDs)	Tony Gregory (Ind.)	Dermot Fitzpatrick (FF)	John Stafford (FF)
26th	1989	Bertie Ahern (FF)	Pat Lee (FG)	Tony Gregory (Ind.)	Dermot Fitzpatrick (FF)	John Stafford (FF)
27th	1992	Bertie Ahern (FF)	Jim Mitchell (FG)	Tony Gregory (Ind.)	Joe Costello (Lab)	4 seats 1992–2016
28th	1997	Bertie Ahern (FF)	Jim Mitchell (FG)	Tony Gregory (Ind.)	Marian McGennis (FF)	4 seats 1992–2016
29th	2002	Bertie Ahern (FF)	Dermot Fitzpatrick (FF)	Tony Gregory (Ind.)	Joe Costello (Lab)	4 seats 1992–2016
30th	2007	Bertie Ahern (FF)	Cyprian Brady (FF)	Tony Gregory (Ind.)	Joe Costello (Lab)	4 seats 1992–2016
30th	2009 by-election	Bertie Ahern (FF)	Cyprian Brady (FF)	Maureen O'Sullivan (Ind.)	Joe Costello (Lab)	4 seats 1992–2016
31st	2011	Mary Lou McDonald (SF)	Paschal Donohoe (FG)	Maureen O'Sullivan (Ind.)	Joe Costello (Lab)	4 seats 1992–2016
32nd	2016	Mary Lou McDonald (SF)	Paschal Donohoe (FG)	Maureen O'Sullivan (Ind.)	3 seats 2016–2020	
33rd	2020	Mary Lou McDonald (SF)	Paschal Donohoe (FG)	Gary Gannon (SD)	Neasa Hourigan (GP)	4 seats from 2020
34th	2024	Mary Lou McDonald (SF)	Paschal Donohoe (FG)	Gary Gannon (SD)	Marie Sherlock (Lab)	4 seats from 2020
34th	2026 by-election	Mary Lou McDonald (SF)		Gary Gannon (SD)	Marie Sherlock (Lab)	4 seats from 2020
