= Murder of Sophie Toscan du Plantier =

1996 murder in Ireland

Sophie Toscan du Plantier
- Born: Sophie Bouniol; 28 July 1957; Paris, France
- Died: 23 December 1996 (aged 39); Goleen, County Cork, Ireland
- Cause of death: Blunt force trauma
- Body discovered: 23 December 1996, 10 am
- Resting place: Combret, France; 44°30′27″N 3°11′01″E
- Occupation: Television producer
- Spouse: Daniel Toscan du Plantier (m. 1991; died 2003)

Murder location on a map of County Cork

Sophie Toscan du Plantier (28 July 1957 – 23 December 1996), a 39-year-old French woman, was killed outside her holiday home near Toormore, Goleen, County Cork, Ireland, on the night of 23 December 1996.

== Victim ==
Sophie Toscan du Plantier, née Bouniol, was born on 28 July 1957. She was a French television producer and lived in Paris with her husband and a son from her first marriage. She had visited Ireland several times as a teenager and bought the cottage at Toormore in 1993 as a holiday retreat. She was a regular visitor with her son. Locals knew her by her maiden name. The cottage is located in the townland of Dunmanus West in rural West Cork. She arrived alone in Ireland on 20 December 1996, with plans to return to Paris for Christmas.

== Investigation ==
Toscan du Plantier was found dead by a neighbour at 10 am, her body clad in nightwear and boots, in a laneway beside her house. Her longjohn bottoms were caught on a barbed-wire fence. Bloodstains were present on a gate as well as a nearby piece of slate and a concrete block. Her body was left outdoors until the State pathologist, Dr. John Harbison, arrived 28 hours later. He found "laceration and swelling of the brain, fracture of the skull, and multiple blunt head injuries". The facial injuries were so severe that her neighbour could not formally identify her.

The Gardaí have been criticised for mishandling evidence, with several items including the bloodstained gate going missing in their custody. This was later denied by Gardai who said that the gate had been disposed of due to its lack of evidentiary value. They were also alleged to have coerced and intimidated witnesses, including the prime suspect Ian Bailey. A Garda Síochána Ombudsman Commission report concluded that while there was a lack of administration and management in the investigation, there was no evidence of high-level corruption. The report noted that records of the Gardaí investigation had been altered and several pages removed, although this had taken place some time after the initial investigation.

== Suspect ==
Ian Kenneth Bailey was born on 27 January 1957 in Manchester, England. He worked variously as a freelance journalist, sometimes published under the name Eoin Bailey, as a fish factory worker, and held a market stall selling pizzas and poems. He moved to Ireland in 1991 and lived with his partner, Catherine "Jules" Thomas, in Goleen from 1992 onwards.

Bailey, who lived near Toscan du Plantier's home in Ireland, was a suspect arrested twice by the Garda Síochána, yet no charges were laid as the Director of Public Prosecutions (DPP) found there was insufficient evidence to proceed to trial. Bailey lost a libel case against six newspapers in 2003. He also lost a wrongful arrest case against the Gardaí, Minister for Justice, and Attorney General in 2015.

In 2019, Bailey was convicted of murder in absentia by the Cour d'Assises in Paris, and sentenced to 25 years in prison. He was tried in absentia in France after winning a legal battle against extradition. In 2020, Ireland's High Court ruled that Bailey could not be extradited. Bailey died on 21 January 2024, aged 66, following a suspected cardiac arrest outside his residence in Bantry.

Bailey was known to local Gardaí from previous incidents of domestic violence towards his partner, which had resulted in her hospitalisation. In 2001, he was convicted of assault in Skibbereen District Court. A psychiatrist's report prepared for the murder trial concluded he had a "personality constructed on narcissism, psycho-rigidity, violence, impulsiveness, egocentricity, with an intolerance to frustration and a great need for recognition. Under the liberating effects of alcohol, he had the tendency to become violent". After his failed libel case, the judge stated that "Mr Bailey is a man who likes a certain amount of notoriety, that he likes perhaps to be in the limelight, that he likes a bit of self-publicity".

Bailey denied knowing the victim. Several witnesses contradicted this.

Bailey was informed of the murder at 1:40 pm by an Examiner reporter. He denies telling Bailey the woman was French as he did not know this information at that stage. Several witnesses reported being told by Bailey before noon that he was reporting on a murder of a French woman. Another three witnesses stated they were offered crime scene photographs at about 11 am.

While under investigation, he continued to write news articles alleging the victim had "multiple male companions" and steering suspicion for the murder away from West Cork toward France.

In the days following the murder, Bailey was noted to have multiple scratches to his forearms as well as an injury to his forehead. He attributed these to cutting down a Christmas tree on the morning of 22 December. Investigators could not reproduce those injuries while cutting down trees, and witnesses who were with him on the evening of the 22nd, before the murder, could not recall any injuries.

Bailey and his partner gave conflicting accounts of his whereabouts on the night of the murder. In their initial statements to Gardaí, they both said Bailey had been in bed all night long. Thomas subsequently retracted that account and said Bailey had got out of bed about an hour after they had gone to bed at 10 pm, and returned at 9 am with a new injury to his forehead. Bailey changed his story to say that he got up at 4 am, wrote an article for about 30 minutes and returned to bed.

At the 2019 Paris trial, Amanda Reed declared that her 14-year-old had told her that Bailey had told him in February 1997 that he "smashed her brains in with a rock", though Bailey disputed this.Richie and Rosie Thomas declared in 2003 that in 1998, while drinking at home with Bailey after a night out, he began talking to them about the killing and said, "I did it, I did it – I went too far", though again Bailey disputed this.

Bailey wrote to the Director of Public Prosecutions, while being sought by French authorities, to ask for a trial in Ireland as he wished to clear his name.

Bailey died after collapsing, due to a suspected cardiac arrest, outside his residence in Bantry, on 21 January 2024, aged 66.

In January 2024, after Bailey's death, Gardaí conducted a search of his flat with a warrant, taking a laptop, memory sticks, notebooks and personal items which could be used for a DNA profile.

== Key witness ==
On 11 January 1997, a woman who lived in Schull rang the Gardaí from a payphone using an alias to state she saw a man on Kealfadda Bridge at 3 am on the night of the murder. A public appeal was made on television for her to come forward to give a statement. She called the station from her house to say she would not come forward, but the call was traced and she was subsequently identified.

The woman said she was driving with a man who was not her husband and was unwilling to give evidence publicly. In 2015, under oath, she named the man as a since deceased man from Longford.

In the 2003 libel trial, she gave evidence on behalf of the newspapers that the man she saw on the bridge was Bailey.

In 2004, she was threatened with legal action by Bailey to retract her statements. In 2005, she reported being intimidated by Bailey in her shop.

In 2015, she gave evidence on behalf of Bailey in his wrongful arrest civil case. She contradicted her earlier testimony. A transcript of her testimony was referred to the DPP to examine whether she had committed perjury.

== French murder trial ==
In 2007, the Association for the Truth on the Murder of Sophie Toscan du Plantier née Bouniol was founded by her family in order to advance the investigation.

In February 2010, a European Arrest Warrant was issued by a French magistrate which led to the High Court in Ireland granting an extradition order. This was appealed to the Supreme Court by Bailey. In March 2012, the appeal was granted by the Irish Supreme Court. All five judges upheld the appeal on the ground that the French authorities had no intention to try him at this stage; four of the judges also upheld the argument that the European Arrest Warrant prohibited surrendering Bailey to France because the alleged offence occurred outside French territory and there was an absence of reciprocity.

In 2016, Bailey wrote to the Director of Public Prosectutions asking for a trial in Ireland so he could clear his name, which did not happen.

In March 2017, Bailey was arrested in Ireland on foot of a European Arrest Warrant issued by the French authorities. The warrant sought to extradite Bailey to France to stand trial for the voluntary homicide of Sophie Toscan du Plantier and the High Court of Ireland endorsed the warrant. Bailey was successful in avoiding extradition, and in 2018, a French court ruled there was "sufficient grounds" for Bailey to face trial in absentia.

Bailey was convicted in absentia in Paris of murder and sentenced to 25 years in prison on May 31, 2019.

French law claims to have the right of jurisdiction over the murder of a French citizen anywhere in the world. At the time of the French trial, Bailey's Irish solicitor Frank Buttimer said “France has no respect for our justice system. We are a democratic country." Speaking to RTÉ, Mr Buttimer called the French trial a "show trial” that undermines the Irish courts. "It is one jurisdiction telling another jurisdiction that its criminal justice system isn’t up to standard, and that it is the standard that is measured by the other jurisdiction, where I personally think that their system isn’t up to the standard that we have, but we respect their system. They clearly have no respect for ours", the solicitor said.

On 12 October 2020, the judge Paul Burns in Ireland's High Court ruled that Bailey could not be extradited to France on the ground that Section 44 of the European Arrest Warrant Act states that "A person shall not be surrendered under this Act if the offence specified in the European arrest warrant issued in respect of him or her was committed or is alleged to have been committed in a place other than the issuing state". Later that same month, the Irish State decided not to appeal the High Court's finding, effectively ending all attempts to extradite Bailey.

During a French state visit to Dublin in August 2021, President Macron suggested that a new trial for Bailey could be arranged should he wish to travel to France.

== Bandon phone recordings ==
In 2014, when it came to light that phone calls at Garda stations had been secretly recorded, there were claims that some recordings from Bandon Garda station had evidence of irregularities in the Toscan du Plantier investigation. The 297 recorded calls regarding the investigation which had survived a flood were investigated by the Fennelly Commission. The commission concluded that while there was evidence Gardaí were "prepared to contemplate" altering or suppressing evidence that Bailey had not committed the murder, there was no evidence Gardaí had actually done so. It did find that Gardaí improperly disclosed confidential information about the investigation to journalists and other civilians.

== Garda review ==
In June 2022 it was reported that the Garda Serious Crime Review Team would conduct "a full review" of the murder case.

== Media ==
A large number of true crime accounts have been produced:

- The murder was the subject of a 2018 true-crime podcast miniseries titled West Cork, produced by Audible and hosted by documentarian Jennifer Forde and investigative journalist Sam Bungey.
- An hour-long television documentary titled The du Plantier Case produced by RTÉ and presented by Philip Boucher-Hayes was aired in July 2017.
- A five-part television series titled Murder at the Cottage: The Search for Justice for Sophie, produced and directed by Jim Sheridan, aired on Sky Crime in June 2021.
- A documentary series titled Sophie: A Murder in West Cork was made available for streaming on Netflix on 30 June 2021. In January 2025 Bailey's partner Jules Thomas announced she was suing Netflix and production company Lightbox Media, alleging unauthorised filming and fabrication.
- A podcast titled Unsolved Murders: True Crime Stories, produced by Parcast Network, broadcast its episodes 137 & 138 titled "Film Fatale".
- A podcast titled Mens Rea: A True Crime Podcast broadcast its episode 3 titled "The murder of Sophie Toscan du Plantier & trial by press".
- A book titled Death in December: The Story of Sophie Toscan du Plantier by Michael Sheridan was published in 2004.
- A book titled The Murder of Sophie: How I Hunted and Haunted the West Cork Killer by Michael Sheridan was published in December 2020.
- A book titled A Dream of Death by Ralph Riegel was published in June 2020.
- A book titled Murder at Roaringwater by Nick Foster was published in May 2021.
- A book titled The Blow-In: Ian Bailey's fight to clear his name by G.M. Comiskey was published in September 2024.
- A book titled Sophie: The Final Verdict by Senan Molony was published in September 2024. On publication, Tánaiste Micheál Martin stated that Ireland "didn't do right" by Toscan du Plantier".
- A docudrama film titled Re-creation, co-directed by David Merriman and Jim Sheridan and inspired by the 1957 Sidney Lumet film 12 Angry Men, was released in 2025.
- A book titled Debout, comme une reine by Emily Barnett was published in January 2026 in French (ISBN 978-2-07-312095-3).

== See also ==
- List of unsolved murders (1980–1999)
- Minister for Justice Equality and Law Reform v Bailey
