= Paul Burns (judge) =

Irish barrister, High Court judge since 2020

The Hon. Mr. Justice Paul Burns

Judge of the High Court
- Incumbent
- Assumed office 20 March 2020
- Nominated by: Government of Ireland
- Appointed by: Michael D. Higgins

Personal details
- Education: Trinity College Dublin; King's Inns

Paul Burns is an Irish judge and lawyer who has served as a Judge of the High Court of Ireland since March 2020. He previously practiced as a barrister with a specialisation in criminal trials.

== Early life ==
Burns attended Trinity College Dublin where he obtained a bachelor's degree in legal science in 1984 and a Master of Letters in law in 1987.

== Legal career ==
He became a barrister in 1986 and became a senior counsel in 2004. His practice was predominantly focused on criminal law, appearing for both accused persons and the Director of Public Prosecutions. Among the trials he has been involved with included serious offences of murder, sexual offences and drug offences. He has also acted in actions involving judicial review, constitutional law, personal injuries and defamation.

In 1998, he appeared in the Special Criminal Court for Paul Ward in his trial for the murder of Veronica Guerin and in 2003, in the Court of Criminal Appeal for Catherine Nevin in an appeal of her murder conviction. He represented former judge Brian Curtin at trial and in Oireachtas proceedings and later former judge Heather Perrin in her trial for false accounting. In 2007, he was counsel for the Garda Síochána in a case for damages taken by Frank McBrearty Snr and appeared for solicitor Michael Lynn in preliminary hearings. Burns has also represented the wife of John Gilligan in civil proceedings and, in defamation actions against media organisations, Declan Ganley, Paddy McKillen and Denis O'Brien. He prosecuted cases against Thomas "Slab" Murphy and against a man accused of the shooting of Gareth Hutch.

He was appointed to the Electronic Communications Appeals Panel in 2005.

== Judicial career ==
Burns was nominated to become a judge of the High Court of Ireland in December 2019 and was appointed in March 2020. The vacancy was created following Donald Binchy becoming a judge of the Court of Appeal.

He has heard cases involving extradition and bail applications. In October 2020, he refused to order the extradition of Ian Bailey to France for trial arising from the death of Sophie Toscan du Plantier. He has also presided over cases involving personal injuries, medical negligence and homicide.

Coffey is a judge of the Special Criminal Court.
