= Sheelagh Harbison =

Irish medieval historian

- Born: Sheelagh Helen MacSherry; 2 September 1914; Letterkenny, County Donegal, Ireland
- Died: 14 October 2012 (aged 98); Beaumont Hospital, County Dublin, Ireland
- Education: Convent of Notre Dame

Sheelagh Harbison (2 September 1914 – 14 October 2012), was an Irish medieval historian.

== Biography ==
Harbison was born Sheelagh Helen MacSherry on 2 September 1914 in Letterkenny, County Donegal, to bank manager Frederick William MacSherry and his wife, Helen MacDermott. She was the third child in a family of four. Her younger brother Stephen was severely disabled. Harbison spent a lot of time with her mother's sister, "Aunt Gertie", as her brother's care took all his mother's attention. Gertrude married Dr John MacNamara and moved to Corofin, County Clare, in 1922 and took Harbison with them. MacNamara gave Harbison a love of books and learning through his library.

Harbison was sent to boarding school at the Convent of Notre Dame school in Birkdale, Lancashire, when she was twelve. Holidays at that time were with her father's brother, Henry MacSherry, in Eastbourne where she learned to play tennis.

Harbison worked in an office after finishing a secretarial course. When she married Kildare (and later Dublin) medical officer Dr James Austin Harbison, they settled in Sutton, Dublin. They had two children, John and Peter. In 1967, Harbison inherited Inchiquin House from her aunt in Corofin, but the following year her husband died. Harbison went to college as a mature student, undertaking a degree at Trinity College Dublin. Due to her lack of Latin, she initially took on a pass degree but with her ability, the university offered her a history and political science BA moderatorship but she was required to learn Latin. Harbison studied with Professor Annette Jocelyn Otway-Ruthven. She wrote her dissertation on Geoffrey de Geneville under the supervision of Professor James Lydon.

Harbison earned her degree in 1972 and went on to complete a master's which was written on William of Windsor in Ireland, 1369–76, and graduated in 1977. Later, she worked as a research assistant for William Edward Vaughan as she worked on a doctorate. Harbison remained in Trinity, known as "Mrs H", tutoring in medieval history and was elected to Trinity Common Room as an honorary member. While at Trinity, she wrote a number of articles on Irish history including about Limerick and Rindoon castle as well as on Irish swords. Other topics were based on her research on William of Windsor. Harbison died on 14 October 2012, aged 98, in Beaumont Hospital, County Dublin.
