= Rindoon =

Archaeological site in County Roscommon, Ireland

- Rinn Dúin (Irish)
- Rindown, Rinndown
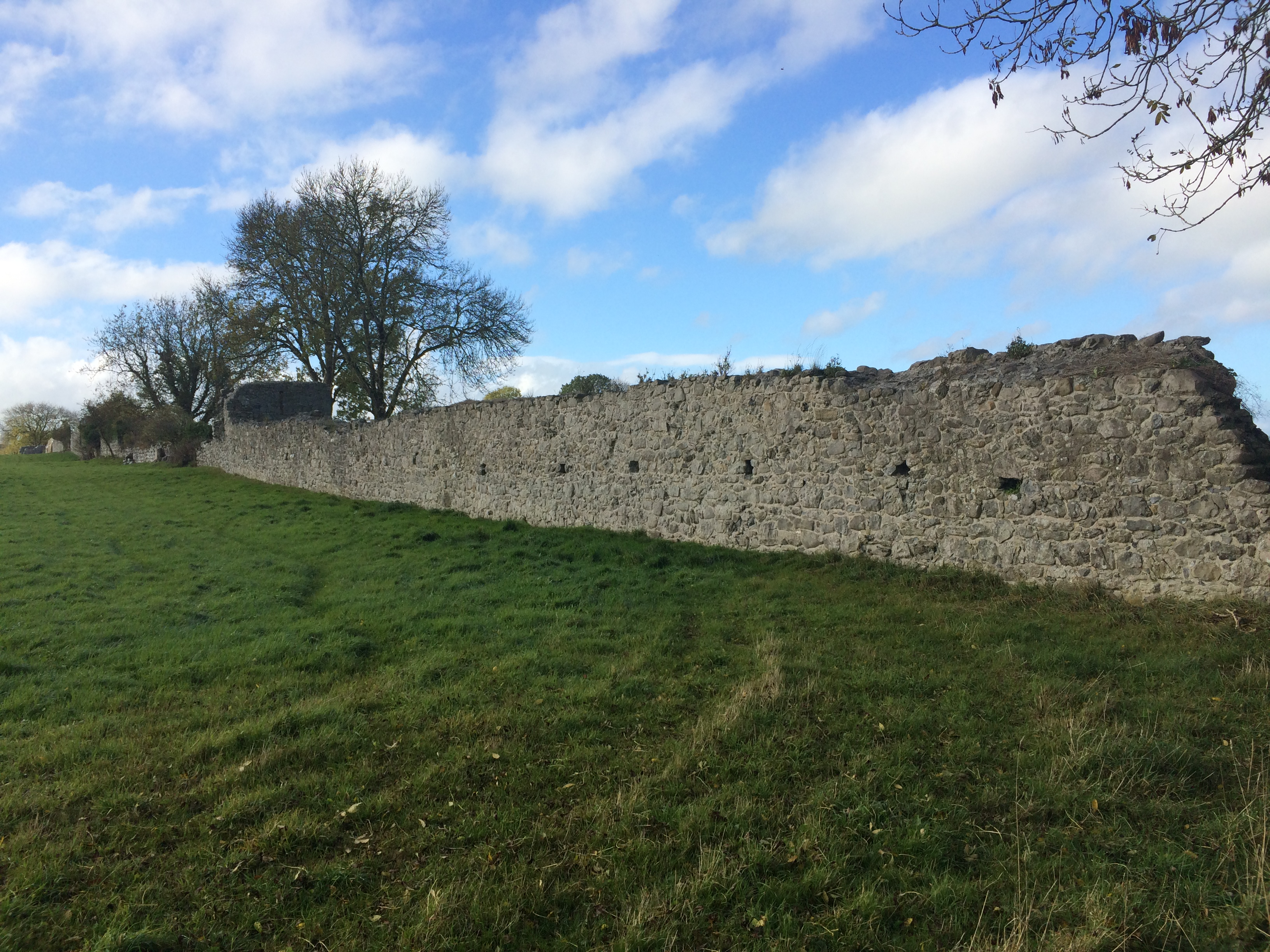
- Rindoon town wall

- Location within Ireland
- 53.538901°N 7.991500°W
- Type: Abandoned village
- Periods: Medieval Ireland
- Location: Warren, St. John's, County Roscommon, Ireland

History
- Built: early 13th century AD
- Abandoned: early 14th centuries

National monument of Ireland

Rindoon (Irish: Rinn Dúin, meaning "fort of the promontory") is a deserted medieval town in County Roscommon, Ireland. The castle and town acted as an Anglo-Norman bridgehead during the 13th-century invasion of Connacht, but were abandoned after repeated attacks by the Gaelic Irish in the 14th century. Substantial ruins survive on the headland, including parts of the castle, stone jetties, a significant portion of the town wall, and other buildings.

== Location ==
Rindoon is located on St. John's Point, a peninsula reaching into Lough Ree, 4 km east of Lecarrow. Rindoon Castle overlooks a sheltered inlet locally known as "Safe Harbour". The harbour controlled the narrowest part of Lough Ree, creating a chokepoint between the north and south parts of the lake and providing a convenient crossing point by boat.

== History and archaeology ==
Historians such as Sheelagh Harbison and Kieran O’Conor have proposed a possible Viking settlement on St. John's Point, along with a pre-Norman fort, known as Rindoon, on which the later Anglo-Norman castle was built. Rindoon first appears in historical sources in 1156 when the King of Connacht, Rory O’Conor, used the harbour as a naval base.

The Anglo-Norman settlement was founded in 1227 by Geoffrey de Marisco, acting as Henry III’s justiciar in Ireland, who began work on a stone castle. In 1229, the development of Rindoon was halted when the town and unfinished castle were attacked and burned by Felim O’Conor, as he vied for the kingship of Connacht. After significant building in 1234 and 1235 by the Anglo-Normans, Felim O’Conor returned in 1236 to attack the town, but this time the castle was complete enough to hold out against his assault. The town did not face direct attack again until 1270, when Aedh O’Conor, Felim’s son, burned a number of settlements in Connacht, including Rindoon.

Aedh O’Conor continued to lead a Gaelic resurgence in Connacht and returned to sack the castle again in 1272. Rindoon underwent significant repairs in the following years and its defences were improved with the addition of wooden towers, an Anglo-Norman garrison, and possibly defensive weapons such as trebuchets and perriers. These improved defences, coupled with Aedh’s death in 1274 and succession disputes amongst the O’Conors, allowed the town to flourish in the 1280s, marking a high point for the settlement.

As the Gaelic resurgence grew from 1290, Rindoon was surrounded by potential enemies in Connacht and needed to be supplied by boat across Lough Ree. The Bruce campaign in Ireland (1315-1318) saw the town and castle burnt by Rory O’Conor in 1315, then vying for the kingship of Connacht; the subsequent famine, disease, and economic downturn damaged the town and it never again paid rents to the Dublin government. Some effort was made to man the castle with Anglo-Norman constables until the 1330s, but by 1340, the castle was controlled by the Gaelic Irish.

In 1570, a government report referred to Rindoon as a ruined castle, and it was mentioned for the last time in another report in 1603, at the end of the Nine Years' War, as belonging to the English Crown. Archaeological evidence, such as gunloops, suggests the castle was refortified between these two dates, and briefly returned to its original role as a border fortress aiming to subdue Connacht.

== Access ==
Rindoon is working farmland under private ownership. In 2009, two looped walks on the peninsula were opened to the public, but were closed again in subsequent years.

== Gallery ==
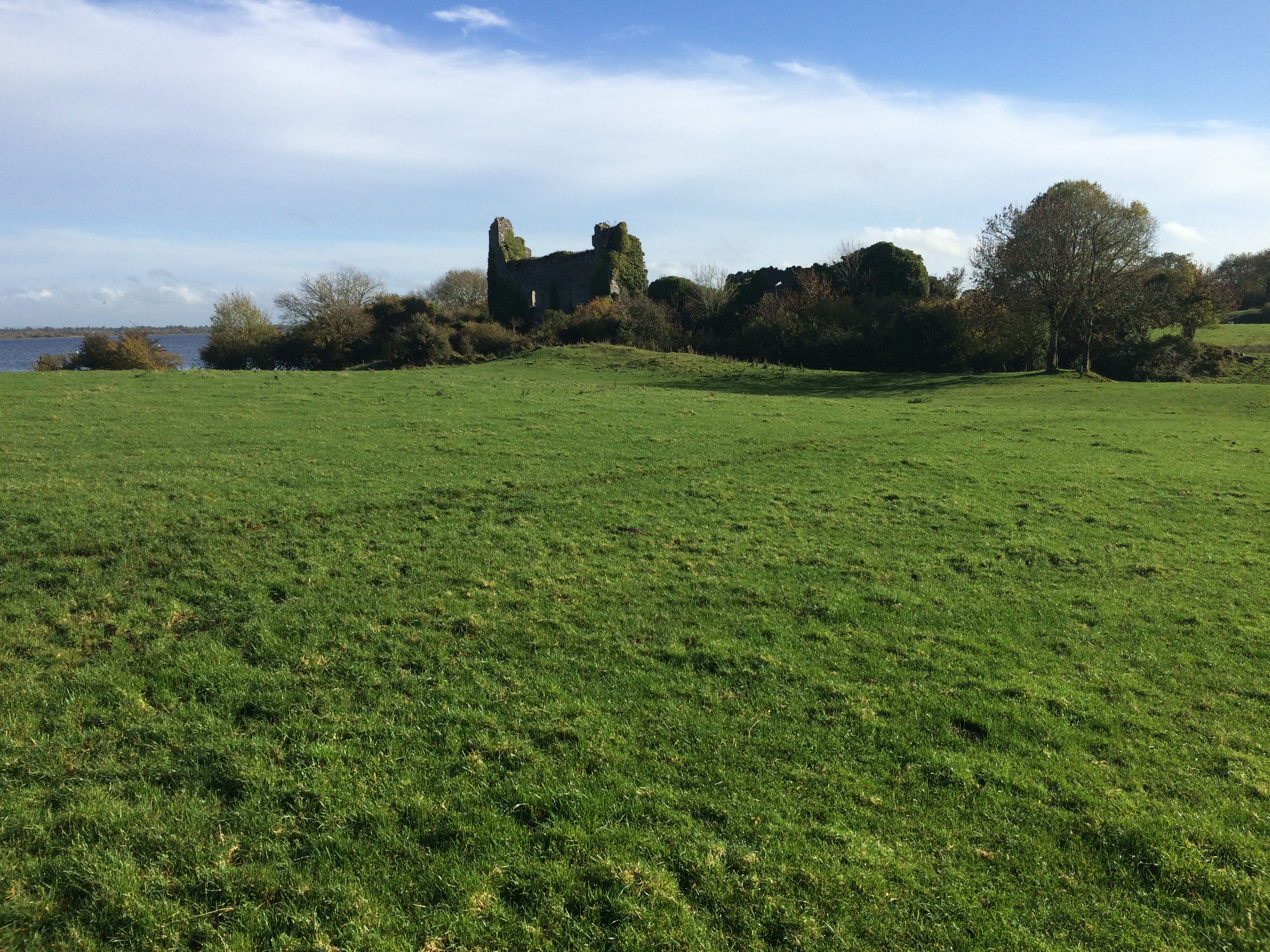
Rindoon Castle

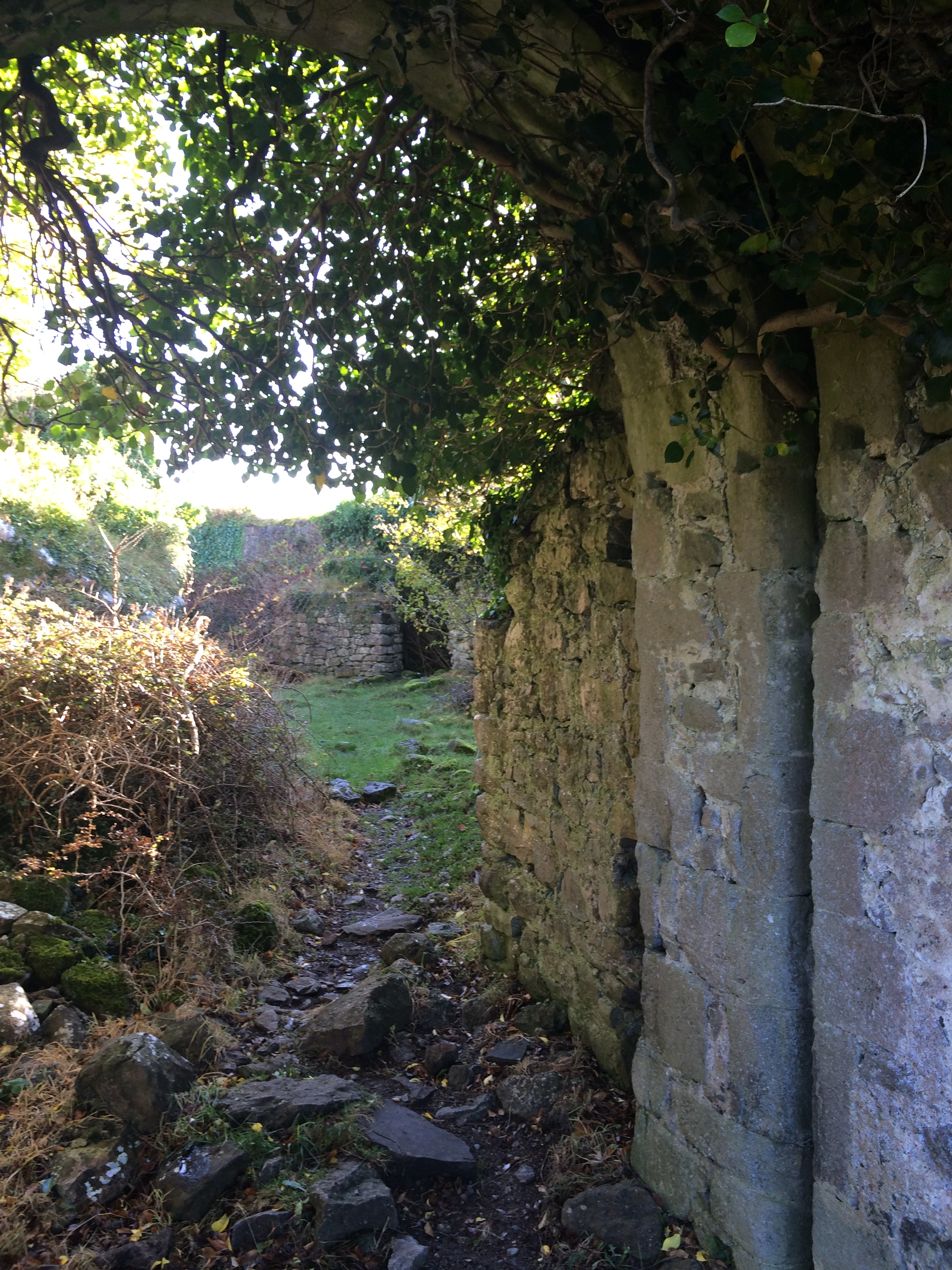
Rindoon Castle main entrance

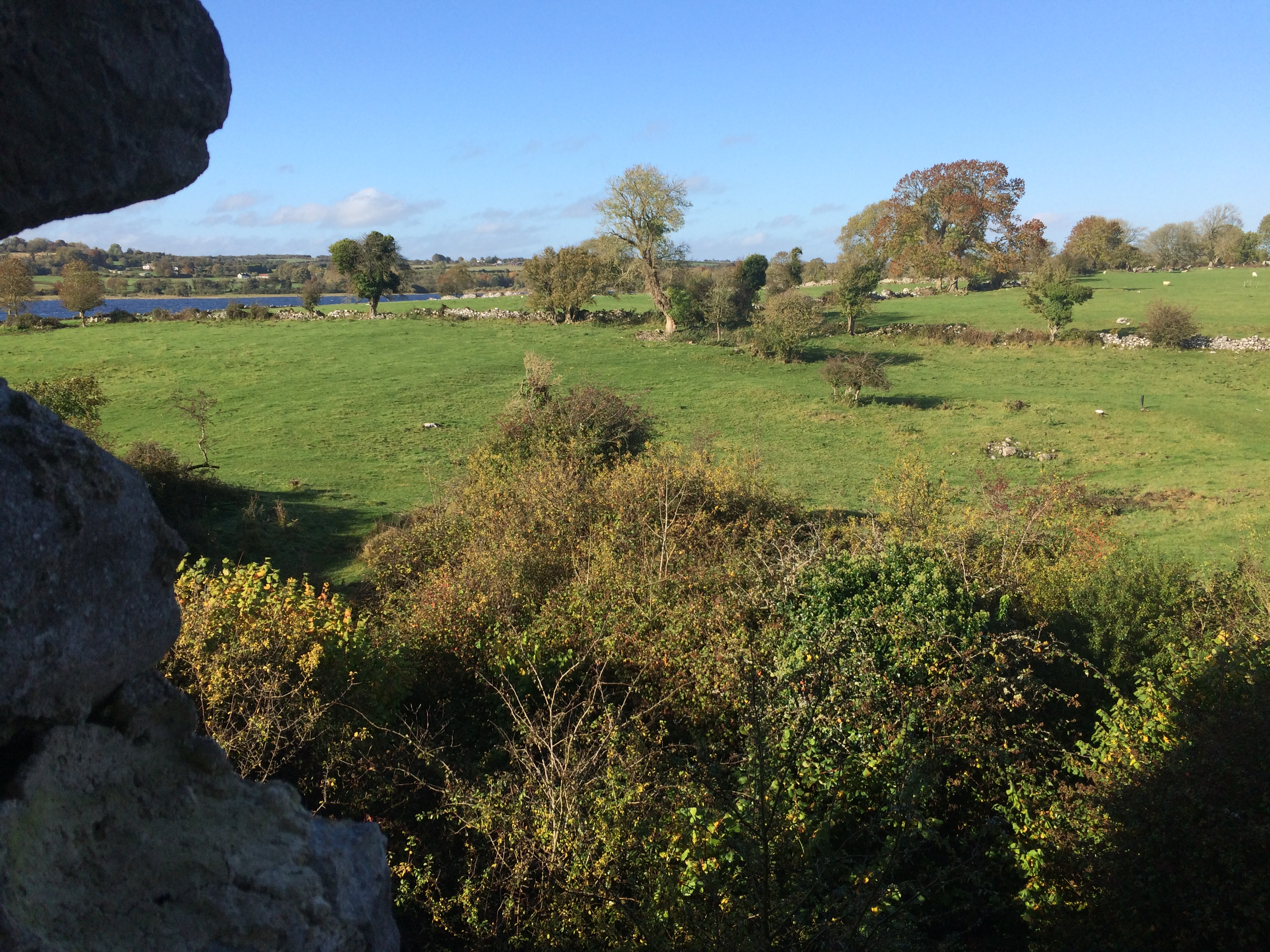
Rindoon, view from the castle

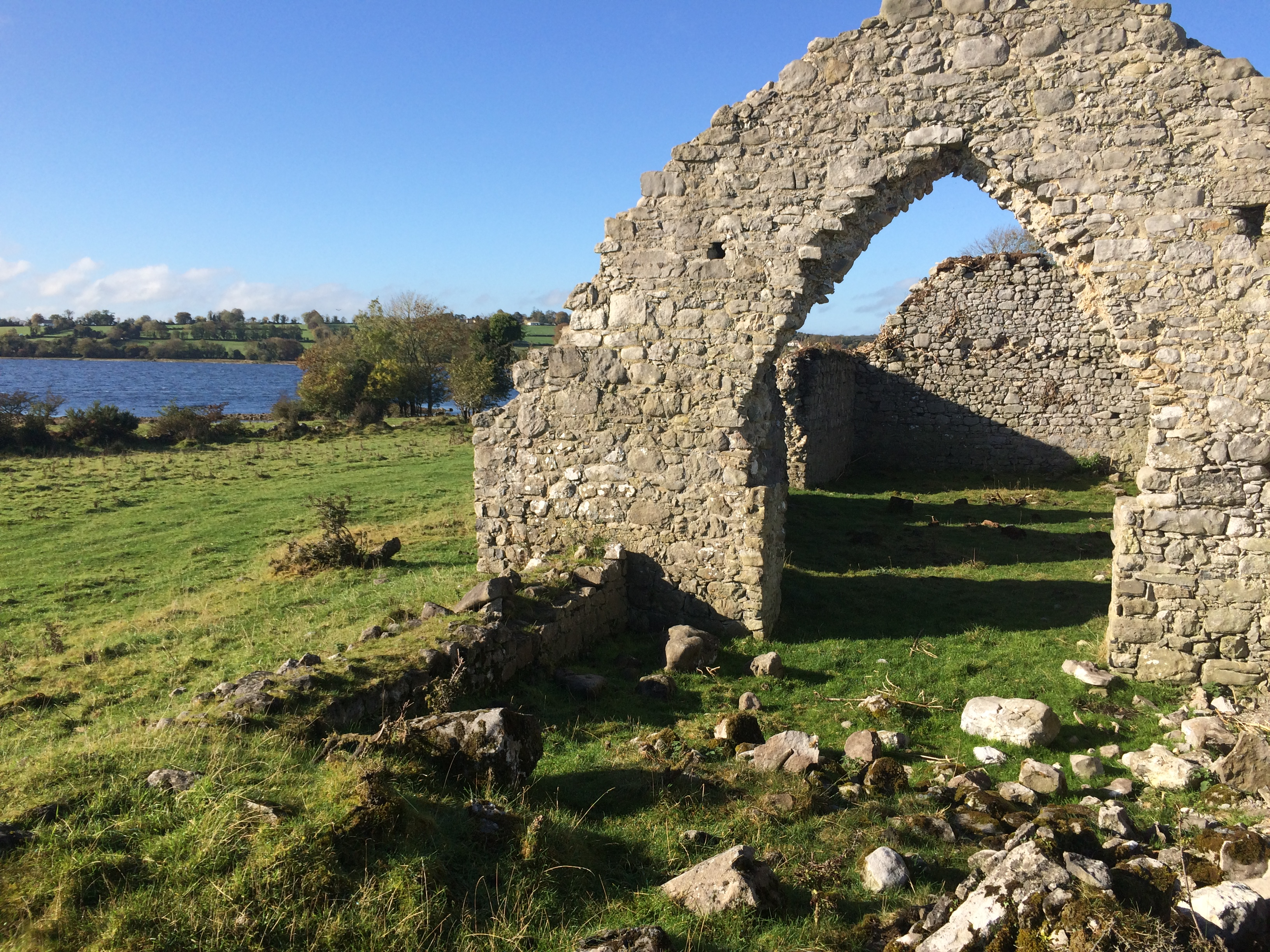
Rindoon Church

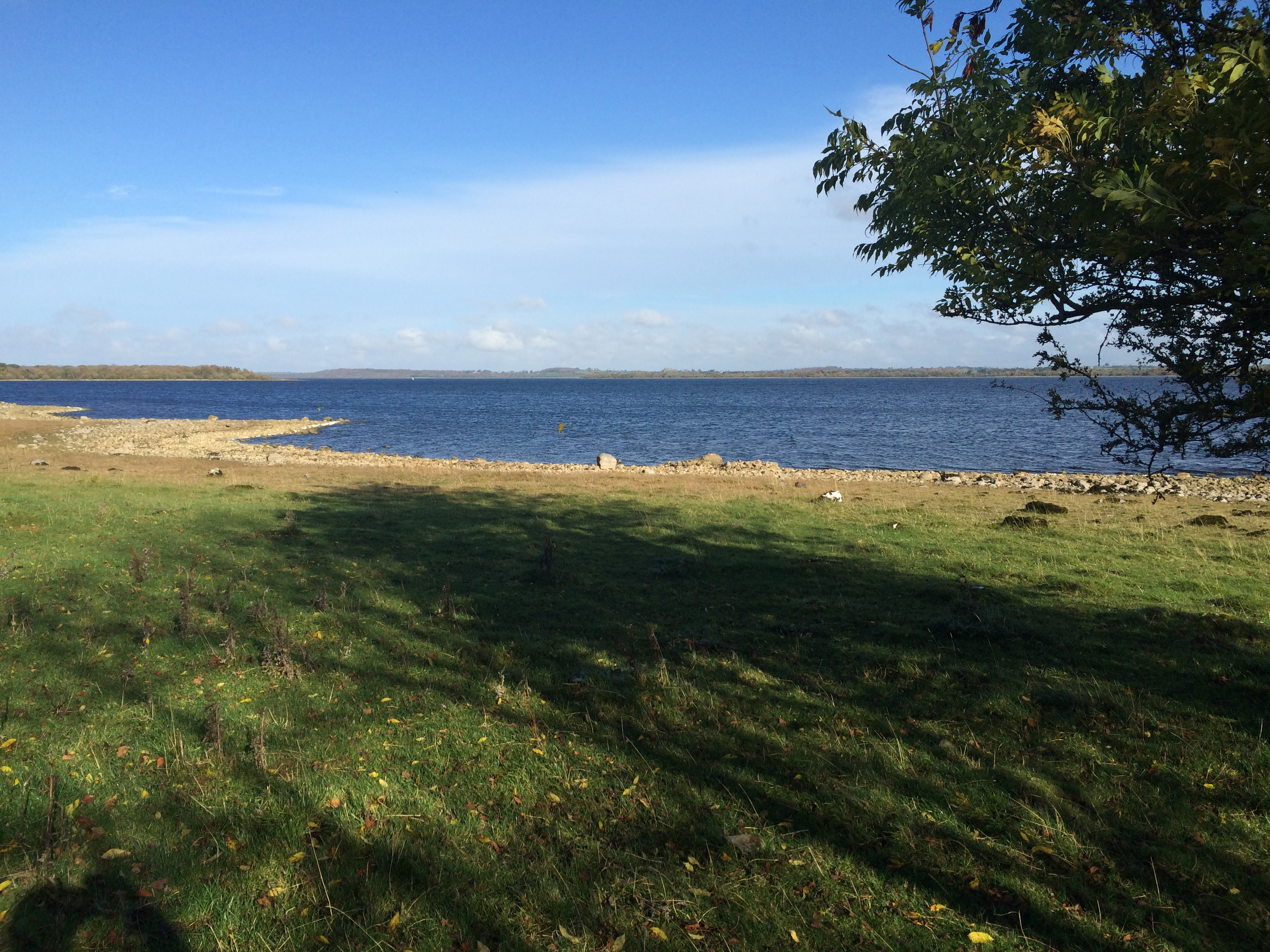
Rindoon Harbour
