= Minister for Justice, Equality and Law Reform v Bailey =

Irish Supreme Court case

Minister for Justice, Equality and Law Reform v Bailey [2012] IESC 16
- Coat of arms of Ireland
- Court: Supreme Court of Ireland
- Citations: Minister for Justice, Equality and Law Reform v Bailey [2012] IESC 16

Case history
- Appealed from: High Court
- Appealed to: Supreme Court

Court membership
- Judges sitting: Denham CJ, Murray J, Hardiman J, Fennelly J, O'Donnell J

Keywords
- European Arrest Warrant; Extradition; Surrender; Arrest warrant; Rendition

Minister for Justice, Equality and Law Reform v Bailey [2012] IESC 16, was an Irish Supreme Court case in which the Court held they did not have the jurisdiction to order the surrender of a non-Irish citizen for the commission of a crime committed in Ireland. Ian Bailey was accused of murdering a French citizen in Ireland. The French judicial authorities requested the extradition of Bailey from Ireland to France so to question him about the crime. However, the issue in this case was that Bailey is not a French citizen, rather his nationality is British. This case dealt with an unprecedented question of law as usually the person requested by the issuing state is a national of that state. The significance of this case was that the Supreme Court dealt with a situation where Bailey was a British national yet the French authorities requested for his extradition. Nevertheless, the Court decided that Bailey could not be surrendered because the French had not actually charged him with a crime.

== Background ==
A European Arrest Warrant for Bailey by the French government for the murder of Sophie Toscan Du Plantier in Ireland. Bailey resisted the extradition order to France. Bailey had previously been investigated for the murder by Irish authorities but was not charged. The Supreme Court had been told by the High Court to consider the public importance of an extraterritorial jurisdiction to prosecute a person for an offense which the DPP had decided not to prosecute. The Court looked at a number of statutes to decide whether the surrender of Bailey would be a violation of the Irish statutes, or if it is unfair to him, or whether it would be an abuse of power.

Ian Bailey was accused of murdering of Sophie Toscan du Plantier some time during 23 December 1996 in Co Cork. On 18 March 2011, the High Court delivered a judgement which decided to surrender Bailey to France. However, after the Court certified to the Supreme Court that this case involved a point of law of public importance, Bailey appealed to the Supreme Court. He did so on the basis of section 16(12) of the European Arrest Warrant as amended by section 12 of the Criminal Justice (Miscellaneous Provisions) Act 2009.

The Supreme Court held that the requirements of section 21A of the European Arrest Warrant Act 2003 (the 2003 Act) had not been satisfied. Meaning, there had been no decision made to prosecute Bailey for the alleged murder of du Plantier by French authorities. Without such a decision, it would be unlawful to extradite him to France. Hence, the appeal was allowed on foot of section 44 of the European Arrest Warrant Act but not on the basis of section 42 of the same Act.

== Main issues ==
The main issue to be considered by the court was how the nationality of Bailey, as a British citizen, having allegedly committed a crime in Ireland would effect the ability of the Irish courts to order his surrender to the issuing state that is France.

== Holding of the Supreme Court ==
The question before the Court was whether the surrender of Bailey is against section 44 of the 2003 Act when the alleged crime was committed in Ireland and when he himself is not a national of the requesting state. An additional problem was that the DPP had decided not to prosecute Bailey due to insufficient evidence. Usually extradition orders are requested when a national of the requesting state commits a crime in that state but flees the country. However, in this case the alleged offence was committed in Ireland. Nevertheless, under French laws, the courts there can request for the return of an accused who has murdered a French citizen even if that murder did not happen in France. Also, Bailey was questioned by the Gardai in relation to the murder of Sophie Toscan du Plantier and his file at the DPP's office had been reviewed multiple times. Yet, the decision to not prosecute him remained the same. This Court had to analyse section 44 of the 2003 Act, section 42 of the same Act as amended by the Criminal Justice (Terrorist Offences) Act 2005 (the 2005 Act), section 21A of the 2003 Act as amended by the 2005 Act and finally section 37 of the 2003 Act.

Section 44 prohibits the surrender of a person if the offence which is alleged against him or her is executed outside the requesting state or if the alleged offence was committed outside of Ireland. In addition, Bailey is a British citizen. So, under Irish laws only Irish citizens can be susceptible to a charge of murder in Ireland. The High Court judge gave value to interpreting section 44 in light of other sections in the 2003 Act.The lower court judge ultimately concluded that section 44 does not prohibit the surrender of Bailey nor does Article 4(7) of the Framework Decision. However the latter section is not part of Irish legislation. Section 44 allows Ireland to extradite someone who is accused of committing a crime outside the issuing state in circumstances where the Irish State would exercise extraterritorial jurisdiction in reciprocal circumstances. The Court decided that it needed to reverse the situation and look at whether the Irish state has any jurisdiction if it was in the shoes of French authorities. Accordingly, it was said that Ireland cannot request for the surrender of a British citizen from France for the murder of an Irish citizen alleged to have been committed by that British citizen. A murder in another state is not an offense which may be prosecuted in Ireland unless it is committed by an Irish citizen. Hence, the Court decided to allow the appeal in relation to section 44 because Bailey cannot be extradited to France when he is not a French citizen.

The next issue was section 42 as amended. It states that a person cannot be surrendered where the DPP or the Attorney General has yet to decide whether the person should be prosecuted or not. This does not apply in the case of Bailey because the DPP had already made a decision after reviewing his file. Likewise, section 42(b) also does not apply to Bailey because it says where proceedings are brought against an accused for an offence outlined in the European arrest warrant by the State, that person cannot be surrendered. However, proceedings were not brought against Bailey anyway. Bailey sought to rely on section 42(c) which had been amended. Court said there is no right to not be prosecuted. Decisions of the prosecutor may be influenced or changed if new evidence emerges no matter how compelling the facts of a case are. Denham J said that Bailey has a right to due and fair procedures, but he had not established that he has a right to not be surrendered. Hence, an appeal on the basis of section 42 was not allowed as the law in Ireland is focused on the amended section and not the original subsection c which Bailey relies on. Subsection c was taken out of section 42 after the amendment.

The third problem was section 21A of the 2003 Act as amended. Member States of the European Union are obliged to surrender people under the Framework Decision. Section 21A as repealed states that in order to extradite a person, the requesting state must first have decided to charge and put that person on trial. The warrant that the French authorities submitted did not.

The Supreme Court allowed the appeal on the first and third grounds of appeal. The Court unanimously overturned the order of the High Court.

== Subsequent developments ==
Bailey successfully resisted extradition again in 2017. French authorities formally charged Ian Bailey and he was convicted in absentia by a French judge in 2019. The French renewed their extradition request following the conviction.

== See also ==
- Murder of Sophie Toscan du Plantier
- Supreme Court of Ireland
- European Arrest Warrant
- High Court (Ireland)
- Extraterritorial jurisdiction in Irish law
