= What Richard Did =

- Australian DVD cover
- Directed by: Lenny Abrahamson
- Written by: Malcolm Campbell
- Produced by: Ed Guiney
- Starring: Jack Reynor; Róisín Murphy; Lars Mikkelsen; Lorraine Pilkington
- Cinematography: David Grennan
- Edited by: Nathan Nugent
- Music by: Stephen Rennicks
- Distributed by: Element Pictures
- Release date: 5 October 2012
- Running time: 87 minutes
- Country: Ireland
- Language: English
- Box office: $488,327

What Richard Did is a 2012 Irish drama film directed by Lenny Abrahamson and written by Malcolm Campbell. The film is loosely based on Kevin Power's Bad Day in Blackrock, a 2008 novel inspired by the real-life death of Brian Murphy in 2000. It won the best Irish film of the year award at the 10th Irish Film & Television Awards and was the most commercially successful Irish film of 2012.

It has screened at the 2012 Toronto International Film Festival and the BFI London Film Festival and was selected to screen at the Tribeca Film Festival in New York in April 2013.

== Plot ==
Richard Karlsen, a charismatic and confident young man, leads a privileged life on Dublin's Southside. A former rugby player for his exclusive fee-paying school's Senior Cup team, he and his friends are enjoying their last summer before university. He develops feelings for Lara Hogan, the girlfriend of Conor Harris, an old teammate. Richard gradually wins her affections, souring his relationship with Conor. The two attend a party in a wealthy suburb with Conor arriving unannounced later. Richard becomes envious of Lara's ongoing platonic friendship with Conor. After briefly stepping outside he is then barred from re-joining the festivities while Lara and Conor remain inside. Richard continues drinking and begins to argue with Lara when she leaves the party. Conor, after confronting some gatecrashers, is angered by Richard's behaviour and hits him. Two mutual friends, Cian and Stephen, step in to defend Richard and punch Conor to the ground. As he lies there, Richard delivers a powerful kick to Conor's head. Richard, Lara, Cian and Stephen leave and observe Conor attempting to stagger back towards the party.

The next morning, Richard is shocked to learn that Conor was later found dead. He meets up with Cian and Stephen and the three agree to keep the incident a secret, with only Lara being aware of their involvement. Lara reassures Richard that she lied to Garda investigators to protect him, telling them that they left the party before the brawl broke out. Richard attends a Garda station and gives a false statement to this effect. He tells the truth to his manic depressive father, Peter, who is distraught and tells him to stay alone at the family's beach house. While there, Richard suffers a breakdown.

A few days later, Peter has ascertained through contacts that the Garda investigation is focusing on the gatecrashers, and that there are no separate inquiries or suspects. Richard and his rugby team meet to say goodbye to Conor. Afterwards, he goes drinking with friends and sleeps with a girl who also attended the party. At Conor's funeral mass, Richard is overcome with guilt after an emotional speech from Conor's heartbroken mother, who is incredulous at the lack of witnesses to the attack. He privately tells Lara that he plans to confess the crime and then suggests eloping with her, but does neither. Some weeks later he is seen beginning his university studies.

== Cast ==
- Jack Reynor as Richard Karlsen
- Róisín Murphy as Lara Hogan
- Lars Mikkelsen as Peter Karlsen
- Lorraine Pilkington as Katherine Karlsen
- Gavin Drea as Stephen
- Fionn Ó Loingsigh as Ciân
- Pádraic Delaney as Pat Kilroy
- Sam Keeley as Conor Harris
- Gabrielle Reidy as Eileen Harris
- David Herlihy as Brendan Harris
- Michelle Doherty as Liv
- Patrick Gibson as Jake
- Liana O'Cleirigh as Clodagh
- Mella Carron as Sophie Kilroy

== Production ==
Unlike Abrahamson's previous two films, the screenplay for What Richard Did was not written by Mark O'Halloran but by Malcolm Campbell. The details of the plot deviate significantly from the source novel. The director worked with the cast for a full year in advance of production while script development was ongoing, holding a series of workshops in an effort to make successive drafts more reflective of contemporary Irish youth culture.

Shot on location in counties Dublin and Wicklow, the film was financed by the Irish Film Board and Screen Scene, and was produced by Element Pictures. At the request of Kevin Power, author of the book that was the source material for the movie, the university scenes at the end of the film were shot at University College Dublin.

== Reception ==
=== Critical response ===
Reviews for What Richard Did were overwhelmingly positive. On Rotten Tomatoes the film has an approval rating of 91% based on 33 reviews, with an average rating of 7.6/10. On Metacritic, the film has a score of 80 out of 100, based on reviews from 13 critics, indicating "generally favorable reviews".

Peter Bradshaw called the film slow-burning and disturbing in The Guardian. "Abrahamson shows that whatever the failings and weaknesses of the young, it is their elders who insist on wriggling away from blame. What Richard Did is an engrossing and intelligent drama that throbs in the mind for hours after the final credits".

=== Accolades ===
In February 2013, the film picked up five awards at the 10th Irish Film & Television Awards including the award for Best Film. Jack Reynor won for Actor Lead Film whilst Lenny Abrahamson and Malcolm Campbell picked up awards for Best Director and Script with Nathan Nugent winning for Editing Film. In May 2013, It won the Golden Tulip (best movie) at The Istanbul International Film Festival in Turkey.

== Home media ==
The film was released on DVD in Ireland on 8 February 2013.
