= Kevin Power =

Irish writer and academic (born 1981)

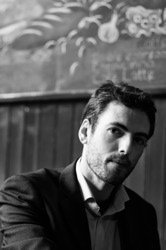
Kevin Power

Kevin Power (born 1981) is an Irish writer and academic. His novel Bad Day in Blackrock was published by The Lilliput Press in 2008 and filmed in 2012 as What Richard Did. In April 2009 Power received the 2008 Hennessy XO Emerging Fiction Award for his short story "The American Girl" and was shortlisted for RTÉ's Francis MacManus short story award in 2007 for his piece entitled "Wilderness Gothic". He is the winner of the 2009 Rooney Prize for Irish Literature.

== Education ==
Power graduated from University College Dublin with a BA (2002), an MA (2003), and a PhD in American Literature in 2013.

== Career ==
He currently teaches in the School of English at Trinity College Dublin. He writes regularly for The Sunday Business Post. In 2026, he became a fellow of Trinity College Dublin.

== Publications ==
- Bad Day in Blackrock. Lilliput, 2010.
- White City. Simon & Schuster, 2021.
- The Written World: Essays & Reviews. Lilliput, 2022.

== Awards ==
- 2007: Shortlisted, RTÉ's Francis MacManus short story award in 2007 for his piece entitled "Wilderness Gothic"
- 2009: Winner, 2008 Hennessy XO Emerging Fiction Award for his short story "The American Girl"
- 2010: Winner, 2009 Rooney Prize for Irish Literature
