= West Cork (podcast) =

Crime podcast

Publication
- No. of episodes: 14
- Original release: February 2018

West Cork is a non-fiction podcast series reported and hosted by Sam Bungey and Jennifer Forde, about the murder of Sophie Toscan du Plantier in Drinane, County Cork, Ireland, on 23 December 1996. The 13-episode series premiered as an Audible original on 8 February 2018, and was made freely available widely as a podcast in 2021. A new episode of the series was released on 14 May 2021, detailing the trial in absentia of the main suspect. A television adaptation of the series is being planned.

The series investigates the murder of Sophie Toscan du Plantier née Bouniol (28 July 1957 – 23 December 1996), a French television producer who was beaten to death outside her holiday home near Toormore, Schull, County Cork, on the night of 23 December 1996. The podcast series was critically acclaimed upon release, and became Audible's most listened-to podcast series of all time.

== Synopsis ==
Sophie Toscan du Plantier was found murdered on 23 December 1996, on the driveway of her holiday home in Drinane, near Schull, County Cork, Ireland. Sophie was born on 28 July 1957 and raised in the first district of Paris in an apartment where her parents Marguerite and Georges Bouniol still live. She married in 1980 and had a son, Pierre-Louis Bauday-Vignaud, the following year. Sophie was a producer of documentaries for French television, on subjects around art and various subcultures. In 1991 she remarried to the renowned French film producer Daniel Toscan du Plantier. They lived in the second district of Paris and in 1992 Sophie bought a getaway home in Toormore, County Cork. Sophie visited frequently with friends and family but in December 1996 she travelled there alone for the first time.

Among her documentary projects is a film about the concept of the fold in art and philosophy, titled Il Voit des Plis Partout (He Sees Folds Everywhere). Directed by Guy Girard the film was released a year after her murder and was billed as presented by ‘Sophie Toscan Du Plantier"

== People involved ==
- Sophie Toscan du Plantier: Murder victim. 39-year-old French documentary producer.
- Ian Bailey: English-born freelance journalist and principal suspect in murder.
- Jules Thomas: Bailey's longtime partner, Jules is mother of three girls, none by Bailey.
- Marie Farrell: Key witness who claimed she saw Ian Bailey near the crime scene on the night of the murder. Several years later, she recanted this testimony claiming she had been coached by gardai.
- Martin Graham police informant but double crossed the police, telling Bailey of their plan to elicit a confession
- Pierre-Louis Bauday-Vignaud: Sophie's son from a previous marriage, who was 14 at the time of his mother's murder
- Marie Dosé: Lead prosecuting lawyer in the 2019 trial in absentia of Ian Bailey in Paris.
- Alain Spilliaert: lawyer for the Buoniol family.
- Dermot Dwyer: Retired former chief superintendent of the West Cork division of An Garda Siochana, former lead detective in the investigation.
- Eugene Gilligan: scenes of crimes officer.
- Jim Fitzgerald: detective on the investigation, in charge of two principle witnesses - Marie Farrell and Martin Graham.
- James Donovan: retired head of Garda forensics lab in Dublin.
- Frank Buttimer: Ian Bailey's lawyer
- Dominique Tricaud: Bailey's lawyer in France.
- James Hamilton: retired Director of Public Prosecutions.
- Billy O’Sullivan: former owner of O’Sullivan's Pub in Crookhaven, County Cork. Sophie stopped at O’Sullivan's on the afternoon before she died.
- Shirley Foster: discovered the body shortly after 10am 23 December.
- Leo and Sally Bolger: West Cork couple who kept horses on land next to Sophie's house. Bolger claims he saw Alfie Lyons introduce Bailey to Sophie in 1995.

== Episodes ==
No.	Title	Length (minutes)	Original release date
1	"Blow ins"	27:00	8 February 2018
West Cork, Ireland is an outpost at the edge of Europe, the jumping-off point for America. Rugged windswept and coastal, it was a place of farmers and fisherman until the 1960s, when it was discovered by the ‘blow-in’s.’ People who drove until the road ran out, artists and urban runaways – a haven for those ready to turn their backs on their old lives and start again. But then there was a murder in West Cork, and overnight, everything changed.
2	"The Back of Beyond"	27:00	8 February 2018
A body is found at the end of a path leading to three houses. In West Cork, the police, known in Ireland as ‘the guards,’ have little experience with serious crime, and the victim—a French woman with a holiday home in the area—is a mysterious figure in West Cork. That night, as news of the murder snakes through the community, everyone begins to question whether or not they were ever, truly, safe.
3	"Sophie Bouniol"	34:00	8 February 2018
Sophie Bouniol, commonly referred to by her married name, Sophie Toscan du Plantier, was 39 years old when she was murdered, a well-connected French film producer. In a place where there had been no murder that anyone can remember, locals speculated that the murderer must have come from out of town. But West Cork grapples with which version of Sophie to believe. Rumors about Sophie and her love life, fueled by tabloid headlines, abound. But there was a quieter, more bookish side to her, a side better represented by the small, simple, white house she kept in West Cork. In this episode we get to know Sophie, from the perspective of those who loved her most.
4	"Killer Among Us"	35:00	8 February 2018
In the weeks following the murder, Schull, the jewel-box vacation town closest to Sophie’s home, becomes a very different kind of place to live. With no answers, and the police focusing on locals, the townspeople start watching their neighbors more closely. And the guards begin receiving anonymous calls about a ‘strange man’ in town.
5	"A Good Suspect"	32:00	8 February 2018
The guards have a suspect—one who has spent the last 20 years trying to convince Ireland that he is not a murderer. We begin on the first day of the investigation, tracing the suspects’ behavior over the six weeks following the murder, up until the day of his arrest. What was he up to, and how did he become the central figure in one of Ireland’s most notorious murder cases?
6	"The Englishman"	39:00	8 February 2018
A blow-in from Manchester, England, the suspect has been grating on locals ever since he first arrived in West Cork. He has been accused of inserting himself into the investigation and delighting in his notoriety, at the expense of figuring out what really happened to Sophie. Though he is often perceived as arrogant and tactless, his history and personal diaries reveal deep insecurities, and a man increasingly desperate to save himself.
7	"The Arrest"	37:00	8 February 2018
On 10 February 1997, the guards make an arrest in a well-orchestrated plan to snare their chief suspect. There’s an interrogation, a question of coercion, and an alibi that doesn’t quite hold up—but no confession. The charge doesn’t stick, for now, but someone close to the suspect appears to waffle on his guilt.
8	"The Game Is On"	38:00	8 February 2018
After the guards fail to get a confession, a game of cat and mouse ensues; the guards need more evidence, but worry that they are being outsmarted. In this episode, secret recordings of the guards give an insight into the lengths they were willing to go to ensnare their suspect—planting spies, using wires—to little success.
9	"Moonshine Effect"	36:00	8 February 2018
After the arrest is made public in West Cork, the town is terrified, convinced there is a murderer next-door. And yet, the suspect remains. It seems everyone has a theory, a story about the suspects’ strangeness, from the plausible to the absurd: that he is a sexual predator, he wanders the countryside alone, howling, driven to madness by the full moon. As it turns out, however, some if the craziest rumors were coming from an unlikely source: the suspect himself.
10	"Shanghaied"	43:00	8 February 2018
Sophie Toscan du Plantier’s murder is big news in Ireland—so big that the suspect takes the newspapers to court for defamation, intending to clear his name with the public. But it backfires spectacularly when the newspapers round up angry locals to testify, air secret diaries, and reveal the suspects’ long history as a domestic abuser.
11	"Enemy #1"	36:00	8 February 2018
After the defamation trial, no one understands why the suspect is still a free man. But the case against him is quickly unraveling; there’s a new, seasoned lawyer, trouble with a key witnesses’ story, and questions about the legitimacy of the guards’ investigation.
12	"Loose Ends"	42:00	8 February 2018
So if the guards’ chief suspect didn’t kill Sophie, who did? Theories abound: a ‘French Connection,’ a murderous horse, a misidentified man in a long black coat. There are promising leads that seem to have gone unpursued by the police, and the distinct impression that the case wasn’t nearly as strong as it originally seemed to be.
13	"An Intimate Conviction"	46:00	8 February 2018
While the case has reached a stalemate in Ireland, a parallel investigation in France--pushed along by Sophie’s family--is moving forward. The suspect finds himself confronted with new charges, the community grapples with the case, and Sophie’s son, just 15 when his mother was murdered, shares a pint in his mother’s favourite pub in West Cork with the last known person who saw her alive.
14	"He Sees Sophie Everywhere"	53:00	14 May 2021
An Englishman is on trial in a French court for a murder committed in Ireland. With no defendant present. And no defence.

== Release ==
The 13-episode series premiered as an Audible original on 8 February 2018, and was made freely available widely as a podcast in 2021.

On 14 May 2021, West Cork creators released a new episode of the series, detailing the trial and conviction in-absentia of Ian Bailey. The episode made news for uncovering forensic results that had not been made public showing that unknown male DNA was found on an exhibit taken from the crime scene.

== Reception ==
The podcast series is Audible's most listened-to podcast series of all time, and spent seven consecutive weeks as the site's number one nonfiction best seller. The series became notable again in April 2021 when it was released free-to air-on the general podcast platforms and went in at number one In the Apple podcast charts in several countries.

=== Critical reception ===
West Cork was critically acclaimed upon release.

The series has been widely praised, with documentary maker Louis Theroux describing the series as "possibly the best true crime podcast of all time". Nicholas Quah at Vulture described it as "vastly more soulful than its true crime peers" and "a stellar true crime tale". Justine McCarthy in The Sunday Times described it as a "seminal series" and "a work of forensic journalism stamped with integrity". Una Mullaly in The Irish Times called it "the next Serial". Writing in The Times, India Knight said "West Cork is the new Serial. It may even be better" The Telegraph described the series as "Brilliantly reported and compellingly constructed". New York Magazine and Time magazine voted West Cork one of the podcasts of 2018 and Time said "The hosts beautifully communicate how a tragedy can impact a town and its people in devastating ways". Esquire called it "a bit of a phenomenon". Writing in Wired, Virginia Heffernan called it "engrossing". The Guardian called West Cork a "nuanced, insightful examination", wrote that the series is "important because of the way it handles the tragedy", and declared "it has everything you need for a top notch investigative series".

Shane O'Mahony, a UK-based Irish criminologist, has praised the podcast in his analysis of the case in a book chapter that argues that new media such as podcasts has the potential to subvert traditional stereotypes in reporting on violence against women. The podcast is held up as a gold standard example of the potential of new media in this regard.

=== Local reception ===
Leading regional newspaper The Southern Star introduced a weekly column devoted to the series noting that "The amount of future projects the West Cork podcast has either inspired or influenced is truly mind boggling." The columnist is effusive in their praise for the series, writing at one point: "we're only three minutes into episode two of 13 and I’ve never felt more alive."

The paper has described the series as "phenomenally successful", as well as "thoughtful and compelling a "huge hit", and a "global smash".

The paper reported that news of a dramatic adaptation of the series by Sister was "bound to create a lot of local interest, given the huge popularity of the original audio podcast."

== TV adaptation ==
On 13 May 2021, Sister, the company behind the Chernobyl miniseries (then Sister Pictures) announced that it was in development with a television adaptation of the West Cork series.
