= Bad Day in Blackrock =

2008 novel by Kevin Power

- Author: Kevin Power
- Language: English
- Publication date: 2008
- Publication place: Ireland
- ISBN: 9781843511465
- OCLC: 277230479
- LC Class: PR6116.O95446 B33

Bad Day in Blackrock is a 2008 novel by Irish writer Kevin Power. The plot was loosely based on the real-life death of Brian Murphy that occurred in Dublin in 2000 as a result of a violent assault outside a nightclub.

== Plot ==
The central protagonist is Richard Culhane, who comes from a wealthy south Dublin neighbourhood. He and his two friends, Stephen O’Brien and Barry Fox, all attended the (fictional) privately run Brookfield College, a secondary school which boasts of producing high-ranking politicians, judges and business leaders. They have now moved on from this and are embarking on university studies. All of the youths are also heavily involved in the Dublin rugby scene. Another of their former schoolmates and rugby teammates is Conor Harris, who was always considered something of an outsider. Both Culhane and Harris had been at one stage or another involved with the much-admired Laura Haines, another of the South Dublin privileged set. Her behaviour at the nightclub is the trigger that finally results in Culhane and his two friends assaulting and accidentally killing Harris.

The story is told in elliptical fashion, moving backward and forward across the span of the story and delving into each of the individuals’ character, background and possible motivations.

== Controversy ==
On release, the novel attracted some controversy because of its similarities to a real-life event. A close friend of the families involved was reported as saying that the novel was ‘insensitive’ and that ‘They're horrified and appalled to think that someone would drag up the case again just as the media interest was beginning to die down.’ Author Kevin Power stated that he did not research the Murphy case while writing the book. He was quoted as saying ‘I would hope they won't react badly. If you find something in a society that people aren't talking about, in a sense that is what fiction is for…it's not a question of trampling all over sensitivities, that's absolutely not my project here at all. So I would hope that no-one draws offence from anything I've done.’

== Critical response ==
Bad Day in Blackrock received widespread praise from the critics. Author John Boyne said in his Irish Times review: 'It's an excellent novel, there's no two ways about that. It comes from the gut, it's raw, it's passionate ... a compulsive read.' The Sunday Business Post review by Dermot Bolger was similarly enthusiastic: "This is a disturbing book and a truly fine one, when was the last time an Irish novel made us properly uncomfortable? This novel marks the debut of a deeply moral and probing writer - and a potentially great one." Peter Murphy in Hot Press called it "A powerful debut and one of the most exciting Irish novels in years." Professor Frank McGuinness called it ‘a piercing contemporary novel".

== Film adaptation ==
Bad Day in Blackrock was adapted into the 2012 film What Richard Did, which loosely follows the novel's storyline. The film was directed by Lenny Abrahamson and starred Jack Reynor as Richard Culhane. Like the book, the film version also attracted widespread critical acclaim and won five awards at the 10th Irish Film & Television Awards.
