= Extraterritorial jurisdiction in Irish law =

Legal principle

The state of Ireland asserts universal jurisdiction and extraterritorial jurisdiction in various situations. Ireland has universal jurisdiction for murder and manslaughter committed by its citizens. This dates from at least 1829, retained by the Offences against the Person Act 1861, as adapted in 1973.

Some international conventions to which the state is party require universal jurisdiction, as reflected in the enabling legislation. Examples include the European Convention on the Suppression of Terrorism the International Criminal Court, and the UN Convention against Transnational Organized Crime.

== Definition ==
Some acts of the Oireachtas criminalise actions abroad by citizens and residents of Ireland. These include counterfeiting money, money laundering, and corruption. In some cases, an action is criminal in Irish law only where it is also a crime in the place where it occurred. Examples are child sex tourism and female genital mutilation.

== History ==
In the 1922 debates on the draft Constitution of the Irish Free State, Darrell Figgis' proposal to have universal jurisdiction over Free State citizens was rejected by Kevin O'Higgins, who said "to set down here in our Constitution a principle of that kind, with no guarantee whatever that it will be honoured or accepted by any single country on the face of the earth is simply inviting ridicule". The Free State's constitutional status was modelled on that of the Dominion of Canada, in which the Colonial Laws Validity Act 1865 was interpreted as not allowing extraterritoriality. While Free State governments rejected in principle the idea that the 1865 act applied to their jurisdiction, in practice no attempt to breach it was made prior to the Statute of Westminster 1931, which explicitly declared that Dominions could pass extraterritorial laws.

After the current constitution was introduced in 1937, the original text of Article 3 stated that the Ireland's laws would have the same extraterritorial effect as those of its predecessor state, the Irish Free State. The Treason Act 1939 applies to Irish citizens and residents for acts committed outside the state.

The Criminal Law (Jurisdiction) Act 1976 allowed trial in the Republic for crimes committed in Northern Ireland, and vice versa. This arrangement circumvented political and legal difficulties blocking the extradition of suspects in crimes related to The Troubles. The Supreme Court ruled that this Act was constitutional. In 1998–99, in the Northern Ireland peace process, Article 3 of the constitution was rewritten pursuant to the British–Irish Agreement. A new section was added to Article 28, stating "The State may exercise extra-territorial jurisdiction in accordance with the generally recognised principles of international law."

In 2015, a High Court judge disallowed the extradition to the United States a man accused of terrorist offences, for grounds including the failure of the Director of Public Prosecutions to explain why the man had not been charged in an Irish court. On 4 December 2019, Irish citizen Lisa Smith was charged in Dublin with being a member of Islamic State of Iraq and the Levant (ISIL) between 2015 and 2019 while resident in the Middle East; an offence under sections 6 and 7 of the Criminal Justice (Terrorist Offences) Act 2005.
