= State Pathologist's Office =

Irish government office

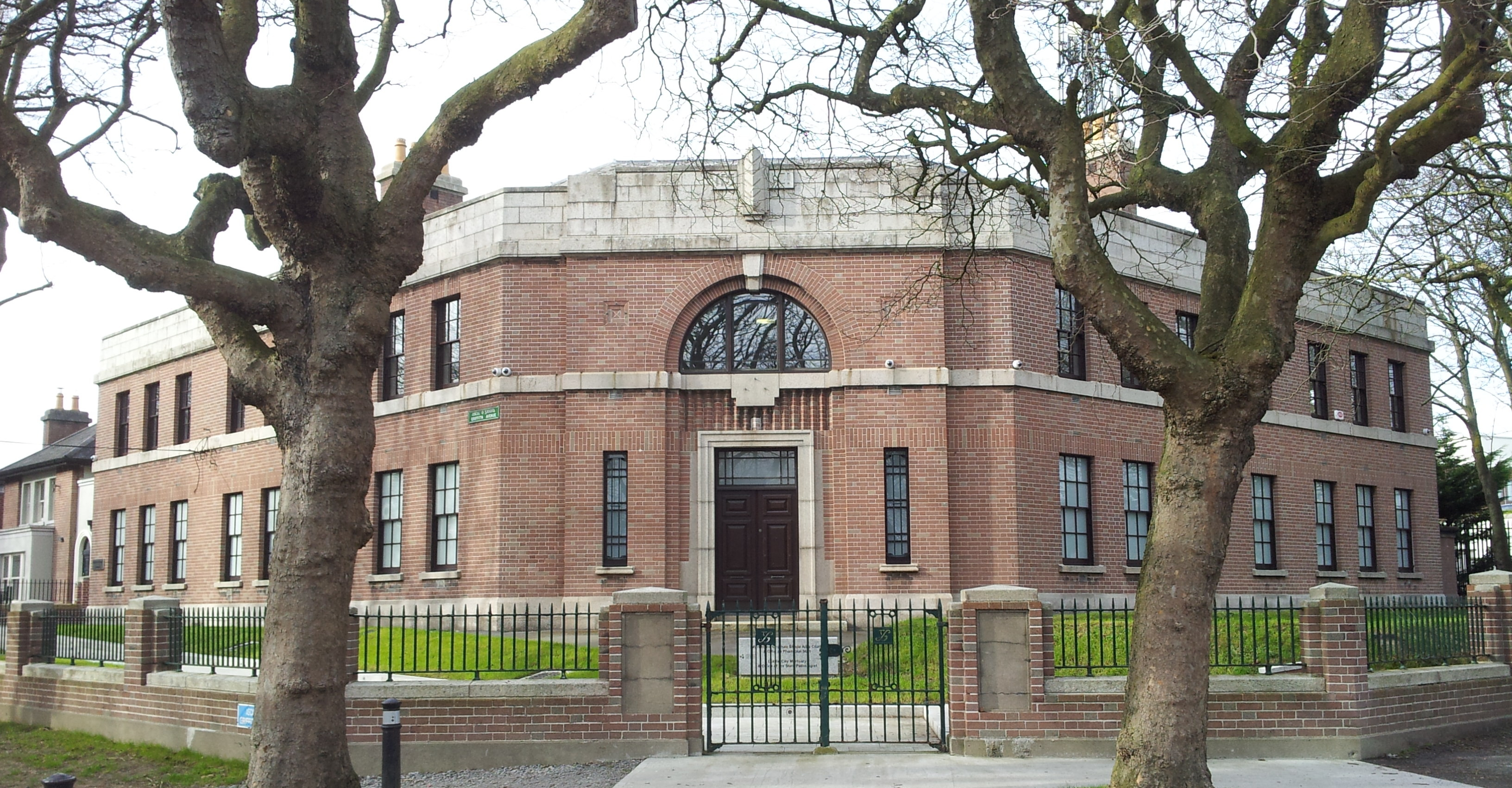
Premises on Griffith Avenue in Dublin

The State Pathologist's Office (Irish: Oifig an Phaiteolaí Stáit) is a branch of the Department of Justice, Home Affairs and Migration in the Republic of Ireland. Its function is to provide independent expert advice on matters relating to forensic pathology and to perform post-mortem examinations in those cases where foul play is suspected (so-called 'state cases'). This function includes providing post-mortem reports to the relevant coroner in appropriate instances, as well as attendance at coroners' inquests and at any court proceedings arising out of the Garda investigation into a death. The office also provides advice to coroners on cases which are not the subject of a criminal investigation, but which nevertheless give rise to complex questions of forensic pathology.

The national forensic pathology service is delivered by the Office of the State Pathologist (OSP) and the experienced team currently consists of the Chief State Pathologist, Professor Linda Mulligan, State Pathologists Dr Heidi Okkers, Dr SallyAnne Collis and Dr Yvonne McCartney and the Assistant State Pathologist, Dr Margot Bolster. This marks the first time that all pathology positions in the State Pathologist's Office have been held by women.

Since 2015, the State Pathologist's Office and City Mortuary have been based in a former Garda station in Whitehall, Dublin. In 2010 work had begun on building a new premises at a site in nearby Marino but this was subsequently abandoned.
