= List of awards and nominations received by Colm Meaney =

Colm Meaney awards
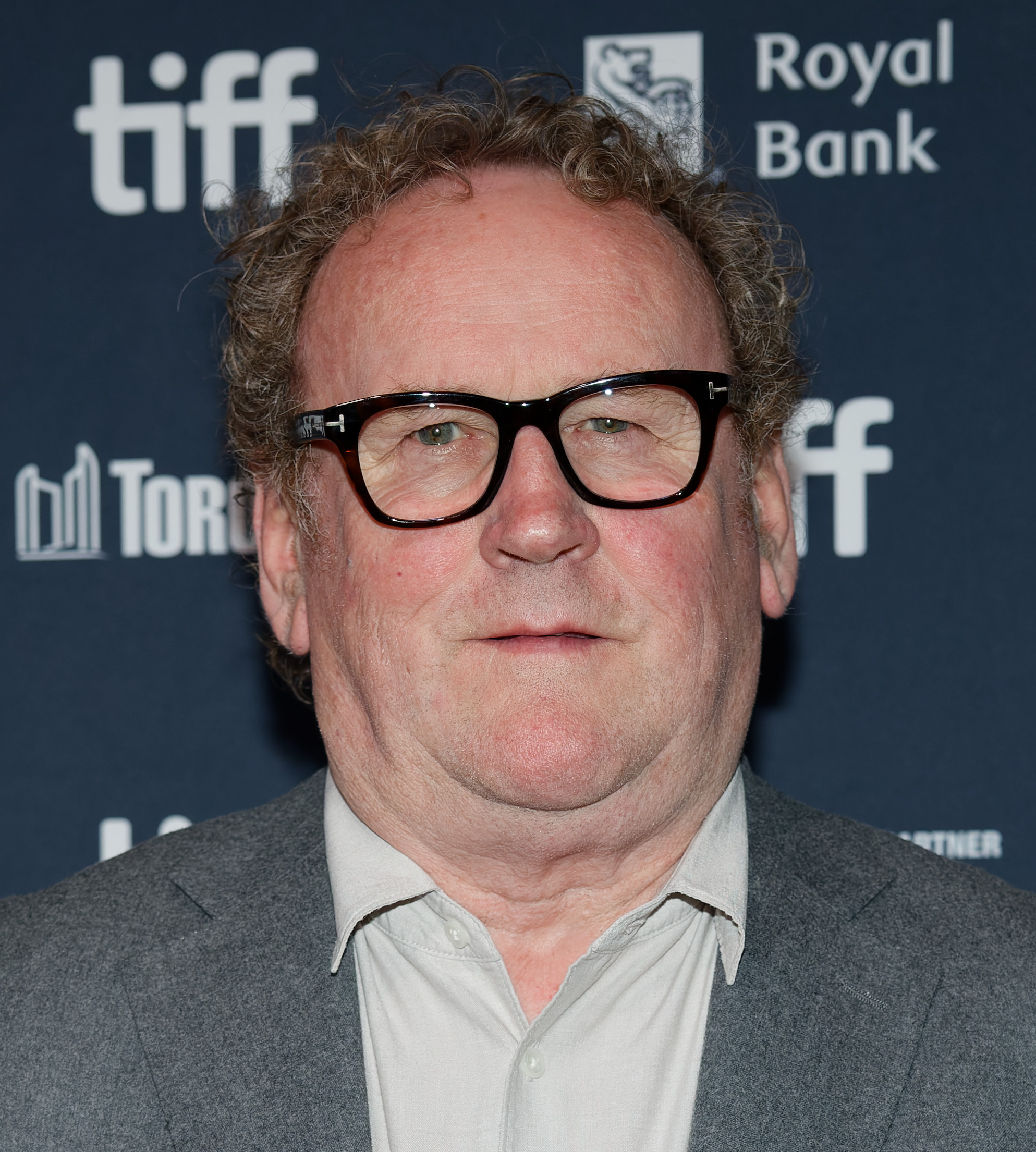
Totals
Award	Wins	Nominations
Drama-Logue Award	0	1
Gemini Awards	0	1
Golden Globes	0	1
GLFF	1	1
Irish Film & Television Academy	3	8
The Irish Post Awards	1	1
Method Fest	1	1
NBFF	1	1
Obie Award	1	1
OFTA	1	3
Olivier Awards	0	1
Saturn Awards	0	1
Silver Hugo Awards	1	1
Golden Reel Award	1	1
Awards won	11
Nominations	23

This article is a List of awards and nominations received by Colm Meaney.

Colm Meaney is an Irish actor of the stage and screen. Over his extensive career, he has received numerous accolades including three Irish Film & Television Academy Awards, a Silver Hugo Award, and an Obie Award, as well as nominations for a Golden Globe Award, an Olivier Award, and a Gemini Award.

For his work on film television he has received seven Irish Film & Television Academy Award nominations for his performances in How Harry Became a Tree, Kings, Parked, Hell on Wheels, The Journey, Pixie, and Gangs of London. For his performance in The Snapper he won the Silver Hugo Award for Best Actor at the 1993 Chicago International Film Festival, and was nominated for the Golden Globe Award for Best Actor in a Motion Picture - Comedy or Musical. From 1997 to 1999 he received three consecutive OFTA Television Award nominations for his work on Star Trek: Deep Space Nine, winning once in 1998. Meaney won the Stockholm Krystal Award for Best Supporting Actor at 2009 Method Fest for his performance in Three and Out, and the Golden Reel Award at the 2012 Tiburon International Film Festival for The Perfect Stranger.

For his work on stage Meaney has received an Obie Award for The Cider House Rules, an Oliver Award nomination for A Moon for the Misbegotten, and a Drama-Logue Award nomination for Diary of a Hunger Strike.

== Major associations ==
=== IFTA Awards ===
Year	Category	Nominated work	Result	Ref.
2003	Best Lead Actor, Film	How Harry Became a Tree	Won	
2008	Best Lead Actor, Film	Kings	Nominated	
2011	Best Lead Actor, Film	Parked	Nominated	
2013	Best Lead Actor, Television	Hell on Wheels	Nominated	
2017	Best Lead Actor, Film	The Journey	Won	
2021	Best Supporting Actor, Film	Pixie	Nominated	
2021	Best Supporting Actor, Film	Gangs of London	Nominated	
2025	Lifetime Achievement Award		Honored	

=== Golden Globe Awards ===
Year	Category	Nominated work	Result	Ref.
1994	Best Actor in a Motion Picture - Comedy or Musical	The Snapper	Nominated	

=== Olivier Awards ===
Year	Category	Nominated work	Result	Ref.
2007	Best Performance in a Supporting Role	A Moon for the Misbegotten	Nominated	

=== Obie Awards ===
Year	Category	Nominated work	Result	Ref.
2000	Distinguished Performance by an Actor	The Cider House Rules	Nominated	

== Miscellaneous awards ==
=== Drama-Logue Award ===
Year	Category	Nominated work	Result	Ref.
1996	Best Actor in a Play	Diary of a Hunger Strike	Nominated	

=== Gemini Awards ===
Year	Category	Nominated work	Result	Ref.
2002	Best Performance by an Actor in a Leading Role in a Dramatic Program or Mini-Series	Random Passage	Nominated	

=== Great Lakes Film Festival ===
Year	Category	Nominated work	Result	Ref.
2007	Best Actor in a Supporting Role	The Metrosexual	Won	

=== The Irish Post Awards ===
Year	Category	Nominated work	Result	Ref.
2019	Lifetime Achievement Award	N/A	Honored	

=== Method Fest ===
Year	Category	Nominated work	Result	Ref.
2009	Stockholm Krystal Award for Best Supporting Actor	Three and Out	Won	

=== Newport Beach Film Festival ===
Year	Category	Nominated work	Result	Ref.
2003	Best Actor	How Harry Became a Tree	Won	

=== Online Film & Television Association ===
Year	Category	Nominated work	Result	Ref.
1997	Best Actor in a Syndicated Series	Star Trek: Deep Space Nine	Nominated	
1998	Best Actor in a Syndicated Series	Star Trek: Deep Space Nine	Won	
1999	Best Actor in a Syndicated Series	Star Trek: Deep Space Nine	Nominated	

=== Saturn Awards ===
Year	Category	Nominated work	Result	Ref.
2013	Best Supporting Actor on Television	Hell on Wheels	Won	

=== Silver Hugo Award ===
Year	Category	Nominated work	Result	Ref.
1993	Best Actor	The Snapper	Won	

=== Tiburon International Film Festival ===
Year	Category	Nominated work	Result	Ref.
2012	Golden Reel Award	The Perfect Stranger	Won	
