= Eureka Street =

Eureka Street may refer to:

- Eureka Street (magazine), an Australian magazine concerned with public affairs, arts, and theology
- Eureka Street (novel), a 1996 novel by Robert McLiam Wilson
- Eureka Street (TV series), a 1999 adaptation of the novel
