= Heno (disambiguation) =

Heno (meaning Tonight in Welsh) is a Welsh-language television programme broadcast on S4C.

Heno can also refer to:

- Heno, founder of the village of Hainewalde in Saxony
- Heno, nickname of Armenian footballer Henrikh Mkhitaryan
- Heno Magee, first winner in 1976 of the Rooney Prize for Irish Literature
- Heno Patera, a volcanic patera on Jupiter's moon Io
- Hé-no, an Iroquois thunder spirit
