= Theatre Workshop Scotland =

Theatre Workshop Scotland (TWS) is a theatre and film production and development company, based in Edinburgh, Scotland. TWS aims to give a voice to marginalised groups, including immigrants and the disabled.

== History ==
TWS was founded in 1965 as Theatre Workshop Edinburgh, by Catherine Robbins and Ros Clark. It was Edinburgh's first drama centre for children. In 1970, Theatre Workshop moved from St Mark's Unitarian Church on Castle Terrace, to its own premises at Hanover Street. Since 1996, Robert Rae has been Artistic Director, and has directed, devised and written twenty professional shows and ten large-scale productions with non-actors. Actors including Ewen Bremner have had their first acting opportunities at TWS. In 2009, the company announced that due to financial constraints, they would have to move out of their premises on Hamilton Place.

== Productions ==
=== Degenerate ===
TWS hosts the annual "Degenerate" festival, the only international disability arts festival held in Scotland.

=== Trouble Sleeping ===
In 2007, TWS produced Trouble Sleeping, a feature film based around the experiences of refugees in Edinburgh, which premiered at the Edinburgh International Film Festival. It was later screened on BBC2, and won a number of awards, including Best New Work at the BAFTA Scotland New Talent Awards, and Best Film at the 2008 Peace on Earth Film Festival, Rockport Film Festival, and Southern Appalachian International Film Festival. Several of the actors involved were also nominated for Best Actor awards at film festivals.

Evelyn's Story

In 1999, Theatre Workshop Edinburgh put on a play, Evelyn's story about the experiences of young Gypsy/Travellers and the racism they face. A young Gypsy/Traveller girl wrote to the theatre group in 1998, telling them of the racism she and her sister faced when they were travelling in Argyll and Bute. Robert Rae, director of the theatre at the time, said he hoped the play would help other children empathise with young Travellers. The play took the form of a "forum" performance and participation was invited from the audience. The play ran from 30 September to 24 October 1999.
