= Embarrassing cheque =

Confidence trick using cheques issued with embarrassing names

The embarrassing cheque is a confidence trick which may also be an urban legend. The scam was supposedly performed by a company selling pornography or other sex aids and trading under a highly explicit name. Customers were invited to purchase adult material from the company, and were assured that the actual transaction could be made with a separate company with a non-explicit name in order to prevent the explicit name from appearing on transaction logs and bank statements.

In fact, the company did not have any items to sell. Once a sufficient number of customers had sent money for items, the company sent out letters of apology to all of them, saying the items were no longer available. They also sent them refunds in the form of company cheques clearly printed with the explicit company name.

The plan would be that the customers would be too embarrassed to cash in a cheque showing the company's real name ("The Anal Sex And Fetish Pornography Company"), not wanting other persons to know about their private lives, so the cheques would never be cashed, and thus the scammers running the company got to keep the money. (The authors of snopes.com have pointed out that customers could cash the cheques via ATM or mail and thus avoid having to confront a bank worker in person. This would not have prevented, however, the cheque description potentially appearing on their customer file.)

It is not known if this trick ever actually happened or not. It is referred to in the film Lock, Stock and Two Smoking Barrels (using "Arse Tickler's Faggots Fan Club" as an embarrassing company name) and the TV series Eureka Street but existed as a legend prior to that.
