= Colm Meaney =

Irish actor (born 1953)

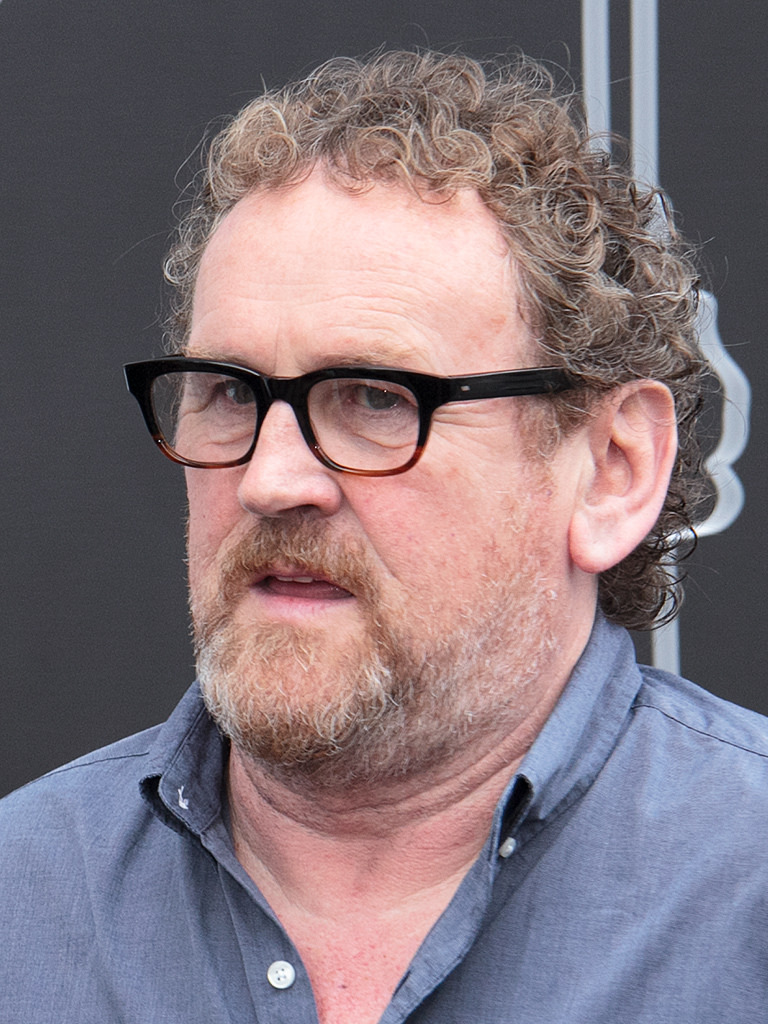
- Meaney at the 2016 Toronto International Film Festival
- Born: 30 May 1953 (age 73); Dublin, Ireland
- Education: Abbey Theatre School
- Occupation: Actor
- Years active: 1971–present
- Spouses: Bairbre Dowling (m. 1977; div. 1994) Ines Glorian (m. 2007)
- Children: 2, including Brenda Meaney
- Awards: Full list

Colm J. Meaney (/ˈkɒləm/; Irish: Colm Ó Maonaigh; born 30 May 1953) is an Irish actor. Known for his performances across screen and stage, he has received seven nominations from the Irish Film & Television Academy, winning twice for 2001's How Harry Became a Tree, and 2016's The Journey. Other film credits include Roddy Doyle's Barrytown franchise, Con Air, Layer Cake, The Damned United, Get Him to the Greek, and The Snapper, for which he was nominated for the Golden Globe Award for Best Actor in a Motion Picture - Comedy or Musical, and won the Silver Hugo Award for Best Actor at the 1993 Chicago International Film Festival.

On television, Meaney is best known for his portrayal of Chief Petty Officer Miles O'Brien in both Star Trek: The Next Generation (1987–1994) and Star Trek: Deep Space Nine (1993–1999), appearing in a total of 225 episodes. Other television credits include five seasons as Thomas C. Durant on the AMC western Hell on Wheels (2011–2016), James Burbage on the TNT historical fiction series Will (2017), and Finn Wallace on the Sky Atlantic crime series Gangs of London (2020). Meaney's numerous guest appearances include roles on Moonlighting, MacGyver, Murdoch Mysteries, Law & Order, The Simpsons, and It's Always Sunny in Philadelphia.

Also a veteran of the theatre, Meaney has starred on Broadway and the West End in Eugene O'Neill's The Iceman Cometh and A Moon for the Misbegotten, Tennessee Williams' Cat on a Hot Tin Roof, and Hugh Whitemore's Breaking the Code. Additionally, he has appeared in numerous productions with the National Theatre of Ireland, including Sean O'Casey's Juno and the Paycock, The Silver Tassie, and The Shadow of a Gunman.

In 2020, Meaney was ranked 24th on The Irish Times list of "The 50 Greatest Irish Film Actors of All Time". In 2025, he received the Irish Film & Television Academy's Lifetime Achievement Award.

== Early life and education ==
Meaney was born in Glasnevin, Dublin, the son of Kathleen and Patrick Meaney, who was a van driver for baking company Johnston Mooney and O'Brien. His brothers are Liam, Padraig, and Sean Meaney. He developed a love of acting at the age of 14, and after completing his leaving cert matriculated to the Abbey Theatre School. Upon completing his studies, Meaney joined the company of the National Theatre of Ireland.

== Career ==
=== Stage ===
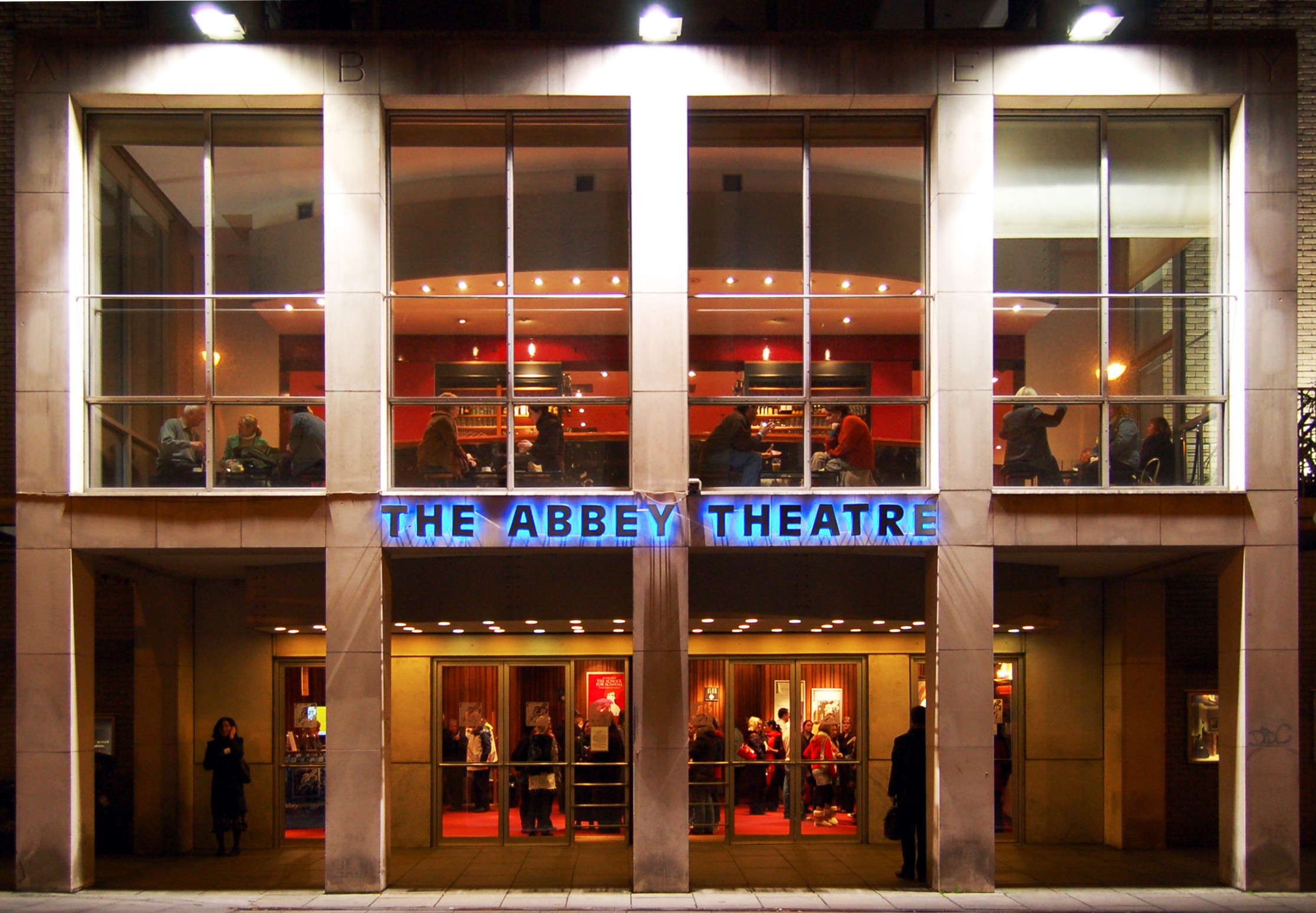
Meaney started his career acting in numerous productions with the Abbey Theatre from 1971-1980.

In 1971, Meaney joined the company of the National Theatre of Ireland, appearing in 24 productions over the next nine years. Credits from this period include William Shakespeare's The Winter's Tale, W. B. Yeats' King Oedipus, George Bernard Shaw's Saint Joan, Dion Boucicault's Arrah-na-Pogue, and Sean O'Casey's Juno and the Paycock. For much of this period, Meaney split his time between Dublin and London, touring the UK with several theatre companies, including the 7:84 theatre group founded by John McGrath. Meaney made his Off-West End debut in 1975, appearing in McGrath's plays Fish in the Sea at the Half Moon Theatre and Yobbo Nowt at the Shaw Theatre. The following year he appeared in a stage adaptation of Lin Piao's History of the Tenth Struggle at the Institute of Contemporary Arts. Meaney made his American stage debut in 1982 at the Great Lakes Shakespeare Festival, where he would remain a summer company member until 1985. Credits from this period include William Shakespeare's Henry V, J. M. Synge's The Playboy of the Western World, Dylan Thomas' A Child's Christmas in Wales, C. P. Taylor's And a Nightingale Sang, and the American premiere of The Life and Adventures of Nicholas Nickleby. The play is an 8½ hour-long stage adaptation of the Charles Dickens’ novel of the same name, performed in two parts. The production was a critical and commercial success, later transferring to Merle Reskin Theatre in Chicago, Illinois.

Meaney made his Off-Broadway debut in 1984, appearing as Kevin in Hugh Leonard's The Poker Sessions at Theater Off Park. In 1986 he relocated from New York City to Los Angeles. That same year he starred in Sławomir Mrożek's Alpha, Harold Pinter's The Birthday Party, and Peter Sheridan's Diary of a Hunger Strike, all at the Los Angeles Theatre Center. Meaney's performance in the latter earned him a Drama-Logue Award nomination for Best Actor in a Play. In 1987, Meaney appeared as Mick Ross in the American premiere of Hugh Whitemore's Breaking the Code at the Kennedy Center in Washington, D.C. Later that same year the production transferred to the Neil Simon Theatre on Broadway. From 1992 to 1993 Meaney appeared in a multi-city tour of Tom Stoppard's Every Good Boy Deserves Favour, directed by his Star Trek co-star Patrick Stewart. Tour venues included Orange County Symphony in Garden Grove, CA; The Chicago Theatre in Chicago, Illinois, and The Fox Theatre in Minneapolis, Minnesota. In 1999 Meaney starred in Peter Parnell's stage adaptation of John Irving's The Cider House Rules at the Atlantic Theater Company. Meaney won an Obie Award for his performance.

Meaney made his West End debut as Phil Hogan in the 2006 revival of Eugene O'Neill's A Moon for the Misbegotten at The Old Vic. Directed by Howard Davies, the cast also featured Kevin Spacey and Eve Best. For his performance, Meaney was nominated for the Olivier Award for Best Performance in a Supporting Role. The following year the production transferred to the Brooks Atkinson Theatre on Broadway. Meaney would later return to Broadway in the 2018 revival of Eugene O'Neill's The Iceman Cometh at Bernard B. Jacobs Theatre. Directed by George C. Wolfe, the cast featured Denzel Washington, Bill Irwin, David Morse, Tammy Blanchard, and Austin Butler. In 2023, after more than a 40-year absence, Meaney returned to the Irish stage in Landmark Productions' revival of the Enda Walsh play Bedbound at the Galway International Arts Festival. Starring opposite his daughter Brenda Meaney, the production later transferred to an additional engagement at the Olympia Theatre, Dublin.

=== Television and film ===
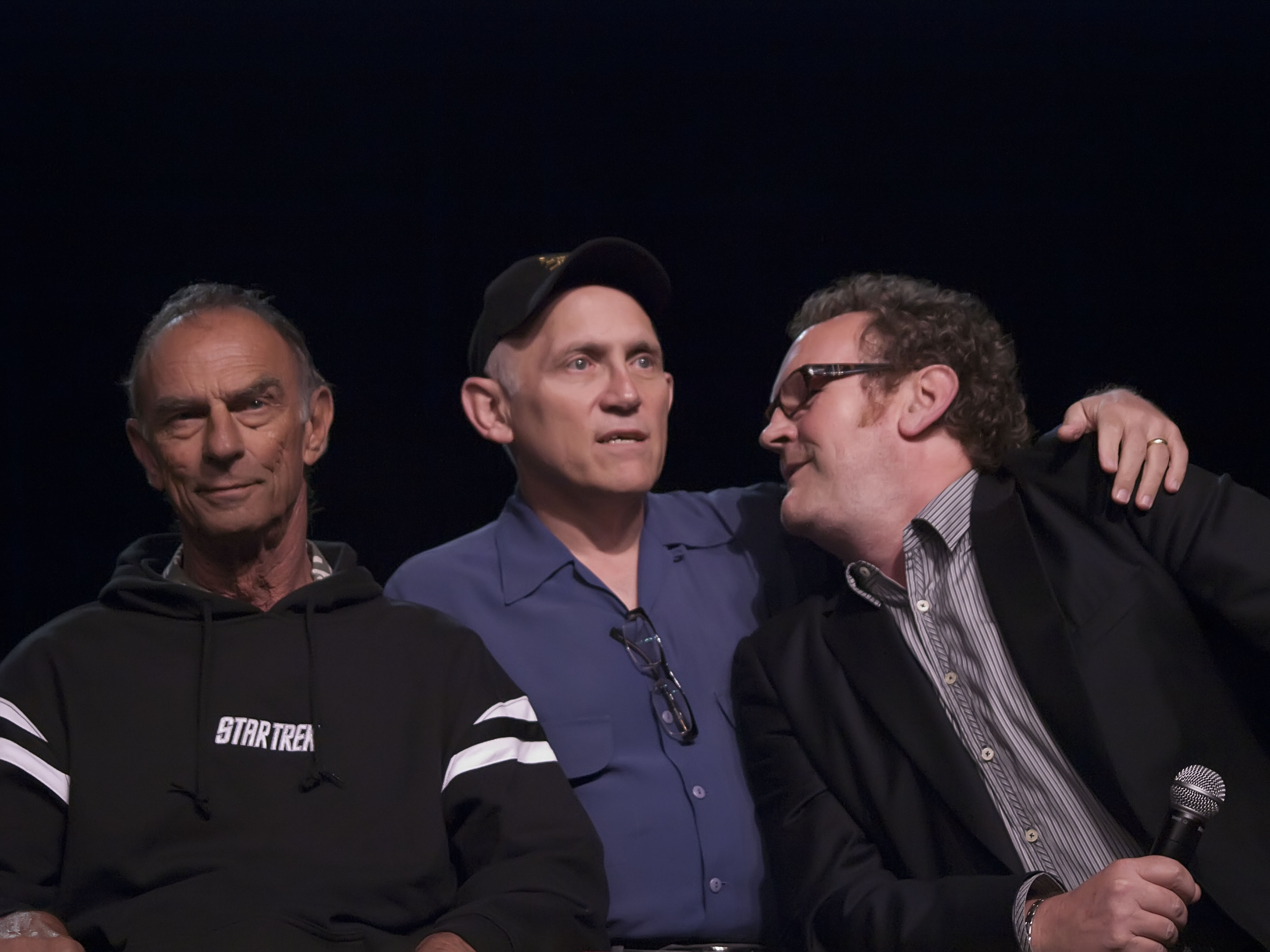
Meaney (right) with Star Trek: Deep Space Nine co-stars Marc Alaimo (left) and Armin Shimerman (middle)

Meaney's first television appearance was in Z-Cars on BBC One, in 1978. He guest-starred on shows such as Remington Steele and Moonlighting before embarking on a successful film career; he received a Golden Globe nomination for Best Actor for his role in The Snapper.

Meaney first appeared on Star Trek: The Next Generation in its 1987 pilot episode, "Encounter at Farpoint", as an unnamed helm officer. His character became a frequently recurring one, and was given the name of Miles O'Brien as he became more prominent in the crew as Transporter Chief. In 1993, Meaney left The Next Generation for a main role in its spin-off Star Trek: Deep Space Nine and remained on that show until its final episode, in 1999. With 225 total appearances on Star Trek, he is second to Michael Dorn with the most appearances on the franchise.

Meaney played Colum O'Hara in the 1994 miniseries Scarlett, the sequel to Gone With the Wind. He has played a minor recurring role as Cowen, leader of the Genii on the series Stargate Atlantis, guest-starred on Law & Order, Law & Order: Criminal Intent and appeared as Bob O'Donnell on the ABC show Men in Trees. Meaney appeared in the film Die Hard 2, playing the pilot of the plane Windsor 114 that was later crashed by Colonel Stuart.

He was the only actor to appear in all three film adaptations of Roddy Doyle's The Barrytown Trilogy, as the father of the Rabbitte family. His stage appearances include the Old Vic production of Eugene O'Neill's A Moon for the Misbegotten. Meaney starred in the British comedy film Three and Out (released in the UK on 25 April 2008). In July of the same year An Post (the Irish Post Office) issued a postage stamp showing Meaney as Joe Mullen in the film Kings.

In 2009, Meaney co-starred with Gerard Butler and Jamie Foxx in Law Abiding Citizen, playing Detective Dunnigan. In March 2009, Meaney voiced an Irish bartender on the St. Patrick's Day episode of The Simpsons, "In the Name of the Grandfather". In the same month the film The Damned United was released, a mostly fictional retelling of the 44-day period in which Brian Clough was manager of Leeds United F.C. Meaney played former Leeds manager Don Revie. He co-starred in Soldiers of Fortune. In 2013, Meaney co-starred in Alan Partridge: Alpha Papa. In 2014, he appeared as The Horse in the BBC's three-part crime story The Driver. For five seasons he portrayed railroad magnate Thomas C. Durant on AMC's drama series Hell on Wheels.

== Personal life ==
From 1977 to 1994, Meaney was married to fellow actress Bairbre Dowling, frequently appearing opposite her on stage and screen. Together they had one daughter, actress Brenda Meaney, born in 1984.

Meaney married French costume designer Ines Glorian in March 2007. Their daughter Ada was born in 2005. The family lives in the Majorcan town of Sóller, with homes in Los Angeles, California, and Dublin, Ireland.

Meaney is a supporter of Sinn Féin.

Meaney is an atheist.

== Acting credits ==
=== Film ===
Year	Title	Role	Notes
1981	Nailed	Younger Protestant	ITV, Television film
1983	Playboy of the Western World	Shawn	PBS, Television film
1984	The Hidden Curriculum	David Dunn	UTV, Television film
1986	Omega Syndrome	Sean	
1987	The Dead	Mr. Bergin	
1987	Kenny Rogers as The Gambler, Part III: The Legend Continues	Tinkerer	NBC, Television film
1989	Perfect Witness	Meagher	HBO, Television film
1990	Come See the Paradise	Gerry McGurn	
1990	Dick Tracy	Cop at Tess's	
1990	Die Hard 2	Pilot	
1991	The Commitments	Jimmy Rabbitte, Sr.	
1992	Under Siege	Daumer	
1992	The Last of the Mohicans	Maj. Ambrose	
1992	Far and Away	Kelly	
1992	Into the West	Barreller	
1993	The Snapper	Dessie Curley	Nominated - Golden Globe Award for Best Actor - Motion Picture Musical or Comedy
1994	War of the Buttons	Geronimo's father	
1994	The Road to Wellville	Dr. Lionel Badger	
1995	The Englishman Who Went Up a Hill But Came Down a Mountain	Morgan the Goat	
1995	Ripple	Nathan	Short film
1996	The Van	Larry	
1996	The Last of the High Kings	Jim Davern	
1997	Con Air	Agent Duncan Malloy	
1997	Owd Bob	Keith Moore	
1998	This Is My Father	Seamus, owner of the Bed and Breakfast	
1998	Monument Ave.	Jackie O'Hara	a.k.a. Snitch
1998	October 22	Steve	
1998	Claire Dolan	Roland Cain	
1998	Money Kings	Al Sheehan	Cinemax, Television film (a.k.a. Vig)
1999	Mystery, Alaska	Mayor Scott Pitcher	
1999	Chapter Zero	Frank Lazarus	
1999	Four Days	Fury	
1999	Most Important	Dan O'Neill	
2001	Backflash	Gin O'Malley	
2001	How Harry Became a Tree	Harry	Irish Film and Television Award for Best Actor
2002	King of Texas	Mr. Tumlinson	TNT, Television film
2002	R.U.S./H.	Capt. Mike Gunnison	CBS, Television film
2003	The Boys from County Clare	Jimmy	
2003	Intermission	Jerry Lynch	
2004	Blueberry	Jimmy McClure	(a.k.a. Renegade)
2004	Bad Apple	Gibbons	CBS, Television film
2004	Layer Cake	Gene	
2004	Battle of the Brave	Benjamin Franklin	
2005	Turning Green	Tom	
2005	Briar & Graves	Father Alister McSweeney	Fox, TV Movie
2006	Caved In: Prehistoric Terror	Vincent	Syfy, Television film
2006	Five Fingers	Gavin	
2006	A Lobster Tale	Cody	
2006	Sixty Minute Man	Charlie	ABC, Television film
2007	Kings	Joe Mullan	Nominated - Irish Film and Television Award for Best Actor
2007	The Metrosexual	The Mayor	Great Lakes Film Festival Award for Best Supporting Actor
2008	Clean Break	Trevor Jones	(a.k.a. Unnatural Causes)
2008	Three and Out	Tommy	(a.k.a. A Deal Is a Deal)
2009	The Damned United	Don Revie	
2009	The Race	Frank Kensay	
2009	Law Abiding Citizen	Detective Dunnigan	
2010	Get Him to the Greek	Jonathan Snow	
2010	Alleged	H. L. Mencken	
2010	Parked	Fred Daly	
2010	The Conspirator	Gen. David Hunter	
2010	The Flight of the Swan	Giannopolus	
2011	El Perfecto Desconocido	Mark O'Reilly	
2012	Whole Lotta Sole	Detective Weller	(a.k.a. Stand Off)
2012	Bel Ami	Monsieur Rousset	
2012	Soldiers of Fortune	Carter Mason	
2012	The Hot Potato	Harry	
2012	The Cold Light of Day	CIA Agent	
2013	Alan Partridge: Alpha Papa	Pat Farrell	
2013	One Chance	Roland Potts	
2013	A Belfast Story	Detective	
2013	Free Birds	Myles Standish	Voice
2014	The Yank	Fintan McGuire	(a.k.a. My Not So Irish Bride)
2014	The Devil's Hand	Elder Beacon	
2015	A Dangerous Arrangement	Leslie	TVM, Television film
2016	Norm of the North	Grandfather	Voice
2016	Pelé: Birth of a Legend	George Raynor	
2016	The Journey	Martin McGuinness	
2016	The Secrets of Emily Blair	Father Avital	
2017	Halal Daddy	Martin Logan	
2018	Cat on a Hot Tin Roof	Big Daddy	NT Live, Television film
2019	Tolkien	Father Francis	
2019	Seberg	Frank Ellroy	
2019	The Last Right	Detective Donall Crowley	
2020	The Banker	Patrick Barker	
2020	Pixie	Dermot O’Brien	
2021	The Monkey	MacDonell	Short film
2021	Lady Betty	Paddy	Short film
2021	There's Always Hope	Jonathan Stack	
2022	Confession	Father Peter	
2022	Save the Cinema	Martyn	
2022	Marlowe	Bernie Ohls	
2022	Unwelcome	"Daddy" Whelan	
2022	Three Day Millionaire	Mr. Barr	
2023	In the Land of Saints and Sinners	Robert McQue	
2023	The Problem with People	Ciáran	
2024	No Way Up	Brandon	
2024	The Ballad of Davy Crockett	Caleb	
2024	Duchess	Frank Monaghan	
2024	Bring Them Down	Ray	
2025	The Panic	J.P. Morgan	
2026	Remarkably Bright Creatures	Ethan Mack	

=== Television ===
Year	Title	Role	Notes
1973	Thursday Play Date	Freddie	Episode: "Hatchet"
1978	Z-Cars	McGlin	Episode: "Pressure"
1981	Les roses de Dublin	Michael Kavanaugh	Main role, 6 episodes
1982	Play for Tomorrow	Kevin Murphy	Episode: "Easter 2016"
1982	Strangers	Smollett	Episode: "Charlie's Brother's Birthday" (Part 1)
1986	Moonlighting	Katharina Suitor	Episode: "Atomic Shakespeare"
1987	Remington Steele	Man in Tavern	Episode: "Steele Hanging in There: Part 2"
1987	Tales from the Darkside	Constable	Episode: "Beetles"
1987–1989	One Life to Live	Alf	Unknown episodes
1987–1992, 1994	Star Trek: The Next Generation	Chief Miles O'Brien	Main role, 52 episodes
1990	Equal Justice	Nucchi	Episode: "The Art of the Possible"
1990	Father Dowling Mysteries	Ernie	Episode: "The Undercover Nun Mystery"
1991	The New Adam-12	Father	Episode: "Panic in Alverez Park"
1991	MacGyver	Dr. Irwin Malcolm	Episode: "Good Knight MacGyver: Part 1"
1992	Jack's Place	Mikey Ford	Episode: "Forever"
1993	Dr. Quinn, Medicine Woman	Jake Slicker	Episode: "Dr. Quinn, Medicine Woman"
1993	Screen Two	Dessie Curley	Episode: "The Snapper"
1993	Brooklyn Bridge	Mr. Kramer	Episode: "Good as Gold"
1993–1999	Star Trek: Deep Space Nine	Chief Miles O'Brien	Main role, 173 episodes
1994	Scarlett	Father Colum O'Hara	2 episodes
1996	Gargoyles	Mr. Dugan (voice)	Episode: "The Hound of Ulster"
1999	The Magical Legend of the Leprechauns	Seamus Muldoon	2 episodes
2002	Random Passage	Thomas Hutchings	Miniseries; Nominated - Gemini Award for Best Performance by an Actor in a Leading Role in a Dramatic Program or Mini-Series
2004	The Murdoch Mysteries	Inspector Brackenreid	2 episodes
2004–2006	Stargate Atlantis	Chief Cowen	3 episodes
2005	Law & Order: Criminal Intent	Judge Harold Garrett	Episode: "In the Wee Small Hours"
2006	The Unit	Charge D'Affaires	Episode: "Security"
2006	Covert One: The Hades Factor	Peter Howell	2 episodes
2007	Men in Trees	Bob O'Donnell	2 episodes
2008	Law & Order	Wyatt Landon	Episode: "Lost Boys"
2009	ZOS: Zone of Separation	George Titac	Main role, 8 episodes
2009	The Simpsons	Tom O'Flanagan (voice)	Episode: "In the Name of the Grandfather"
2009	Life on Mars	Lieutenant Gene Hunt	Episode: "Unaired Pilot"
2009	Mercy	Dr. Parks	Episode: "I Believe You Conrad"
2009	Alice	King of Hearts	2 episodes
2011–2016	Hell on Wheels	Thomas "Doc" Durant	Main role, 52 episodes Nominated - Saturn Award for Best Supporting Actor on Television (2013); Nominated - Irish Film & Television Award for Best Actor TV (2013)
2014	The Driver	The Horse	3 episodes
2015	Childhood's End	Wainwright	Episode: "The Overlords"
2017	Will	James Burbage	Main role, 10 episodes
2020	Gangs of London	Finn Wallace	Main role, 8 episodes
2020	The Singapore Grip	Brendan Archer	Main role, 6 episodes
2021	It's Always Sunny in Philadelphia	Shelley Kelly	2 episodes
2021	Fúria	Michael	2 episodes
2022	The Serpent Queen	King Francis I	4 episodes
2023	Scary Tales of New York	Storyteller	Main role, 6 episodes
2023	The Santa Stories	Bill	Episode: "The Note"
2025	Safe Harbor	Kieran Walsh	Main role, 8 episodes
2026	MobLand	Medusa	Episode: "Birdland"

=== Stage ===
Year	Title	Role	Playwright	Venue	Ref.
1971	Today the Bullfinch	Gentleman	Jack White	Abbey Theatre	
1971	Macbeth	Lord	William Shakespeare	Abbey Theatre	
1971	Hall of Healing	Red Muffler	Sean O'Casey	Abbey Theatre	
1971	The Shadow of a Gunman	Donal Davoren	Sean O'Casey	Abbey Theatre	
1971	The Blue Demon	Mogg / Demonaide	Lin Ford	Abbey Theatre	
1972	Arrah-na-Pogue	Soldier	Dion Boucicault	Abbey Theatre	
1972	The Silver Tassie	The Staff Wallah	Sean O'Casey	Abbey Theatre	
1972	Saint Joan	Soldiers/Accessors	George Bernard Shaw	Abbey Theatre	
1972	Picnic on a Battlefield	Monsieur Tepan	Fernando Arrabal	Abbey Theatre	
1973	The School For Scandal	William	Richard Brinsley Sheridan	Abbey Theatre	
1973	King Oedipus	Chorus	William Butler Yeats	Abbey Theatre	
1973	Escurial	Man in Scarlet	Michel De Ghelderode	Abbey Theatre	
1973	The Night of the Rouser	Second Soldier	Sean Walsh	Abbey Theatre	
1974	King Oedipus	Chorus	William Butler Yeats	Abbey Theatre	
1975	Fish in the Sea	Derick / Vince	John McGrath	7:84 Theatre Company	
1975	Yobbo Nowt	Val	John McGrath	7:84 Theatre Company	
1975	Lay-Off	Fred W. Taylor	John McGrath	7:84 Theatre Company	
1976	History of the Tenth Struggle	Lin Biao	John McGrath	7:84 Theatre Company	
1977	The Slave Camp	Sid Harley	Dave Marson	7:84 Theatre Company	
1978	Hatchet	Freddie	Heno Magee	Abbey Theatre	
1979	Hatchet	Freddie	Heno Magee	Abbey Theatre	
1979	The Death of Humpty Dumpty	Willy John	Joseph Graham Reid	Abbey Theatre	
1979	Juno and the Paycock	Jerry Devine	Sean O'Casey	Abbey Theatre	
1980	The Field	Tadhg Mc Cabe	John B. Keane	Abbey Theatre	
1980	Juno and the Paycock	Jerry Devine	Sean O'Casey	Abbey Theatre	
1980	The Winter's Tale	Cleomenes / Autolycus	William Shakespeare	Abbey Theatre	
1980	The Closed Door	John "Slabber" McCoy	Joseph Graham Reid	Abbey Theatre	
1980	Nightshade	Vance	Stewart Parker	Abbey Theatre	
1980	Nightshade	Vance	Stewart Parker	Abbey Theatre; National Tour	
1982	The Playboy of the Western World	Shawn	John Millington Synge	Great Lakes Shakespeare Festival	
1982	The Life and Adventures of Nicholas Nickleby	John Browdie / Sir Mulberry Hawk	Charles Dickens & David Edgar	Great Lakes Shakespeare Festival	
1983	The Life and Adventures of Nicholas Nickleby	John Browdie / Sir Mulberry Hawk	Charles Dickens & David Edgar	Merle Reskin Theatre, Chicago	
1983	Henry V	Fluellen	William Shakespeare	Great Lakes Shakespeare Festival	
1983	A Child's Christmas in Wales	Tad	Dylan Thomas	Great Lakes Shakespeare Festival	
1984	The Poker Sessions	Kevin	Hugh Leonard	Theater Off Park; Off-Broadway	
1985	And a Nightingale Sang	Eric	C. P. Taylor	Great Lakes Shakespeare Festival	
1986	The Birthday Party	McCann	Harold Pinter	Los Angeles Theatre Center	
1986	Diary of a Hunger Strike	Patrick O'Connor	Peter Sheridan	Los Angeles Theatre Center	
1986	Alpha	The Political Prisoner	Sławomir Mrożek	Los Angeles Theatre Center	
1987	Breaking the Code	Mick Ross	Hugh Whitemore	Kennedy Center	
1987–1988	Breaking the Code	Mick Ross	Hugh Whitemore	Neil Simon Theatre, Broadway	
1993	Every Good Boy Deserves Favour	Colonel	Tom Stoppard	Orange County Symphony	
1993	Every Good Boy Deserves Favour	Colonel	Tom Stoppard	The Chicago Theatre	
1993	Every Good Boy Deserves Favour	Colonel	Tom Stoppard	Fox Theatre, Atlanta	
1994	Every Good Boy Deserves Favour	Colonel	Tom Stoppard	Orpheum Theatre, Minneapolis	
1999	The Cider House Rules	Dr. Wilbur Larch	John Irving & Peter Parnell	Atlantic Theater Company, Off-Broadway	
2007	A Moon for the Misbegotten	Phil Hogan	Eugene O'Neill	Brooks Atkinson Theatre, Broadway	
2007	A Moon for the Misbegotten	Phil Hogan	Eugene O'Neill	The Old Vic, West End	
2017	Cat on a Hot Tin Roof	Big Daddy	Tennessee Williams	Apollo Theatre, West End	
2018	The Iceman Cometh	Harry Hope	Eugene O'Neill	Bernard B. Jacobs Theatre, Broadway	
2023	Bedbound	Father	Enda Walsh	Galway International Arts Festival	
2023	Bedbound	Father	Enda Walsh	Olympia Theatre, Dublin	
