= I Don't Want to Talk About Home =

2022 memoir by Suad Aldarra

I Don't Want to Talk About Home: A Migrant's Search for Belonging is a 2022 memoir by Suad Aldarra. It was published by Penguin Books.

== Awards ==
I Don't Want to Talk About Home was shortlisted for the Irish Book Awards in 2023, and won the Rooney Prize for Literature in 2024.
