= Anne Haverty =

Irish novelist and poet (born 1959)

- Born: 1959 (age 66–67); Holycross, County Tipperary, Ireland
- Education: Trinity College Dublin, The Sorbonne
- Occupations: Novelist, journalist, poet
- Website: annehaverty.weebly.com

Anne Haverty (born 1959) is an Irish novelist and poet. Haverty was educated at Trinity College Dublin and the Sorbonne and in 1992 won a scholarship to the European Film School at Ebeltoft in Denmark. Among Haverty's novels, One Day as a Tiger won the Rooney Prize for Irish Literature in 1997.

== Early life and education ==
Anne Haverty was born in Holycross, County Tipperary, in 1959. She was short-listed for the Whitbread (Costa). She was educated at Trinity College Dublin and The Sorbonne, winning an under-21 short story competition at Listowel Writers Week. In 1992, she won a scholarship to the European Film College in Ebeltoft, Denmark.

== Career ==
The Far Side of a Kiss was long-listed for the Booker. A poetry collection, The Beauty Of The Moon, was a Poetry Book Society Recommendation.

Haverty's biography Constance Markievicz: An Independent Life was first published in 1989 and re-issued in a revised edition as Constance Markievicz: Irish Revolutionary in 2016.

She co-directed (with Frank Stapleton) the documentary The Whole World In His Hands, which won a special award at the Celtic Film Festival, and has written film and radio scripts including an adaptation of The Real Charlotte. Haverty is a frequent contributor to The Irish Times and has written for many publications including the TLS, The Daily Telegraph and the Sunday Independent. Her work has appeared in several anthologies and has been translated into languages including German, Spanish, Portuguese and Armenian. She has read and lectured widely in Ireland and internationally. She was a member of the Literature Express (2000), was a visiting professor at the Adam Mickievicz University in Poznan in 2005 and writer in residence at Trinity College Dublin (2007).

== Personal life ==
A member of Aosdána, she was married to fellow author Anthony Cronin, and lives in Dublin.

== Works ==
=== Non-fiction ===
- An Independent Life a biography of Constance Markievicz (1989 & 2016)
- Elegant Times: A Dublin Story (1995) the story of Brown Thomas and Switzers department stores.

=== Novels ===
- One Day as a Tiger (1997)
- The Far Side of a Kiss (2000)
- The Free and Easy (2006)

=== Translations ===
- Ein Tag Als Tiger (2002)
- Tigre por un día (1998)

=== Poetry collections ===
- The Beauty of the Moon (1999)
- A Break In The Journey (2018)
