= Ripley Bogle =

Book by Robert McLiam Wilson

- First edition
- Author: Robert McLiam Wilson
- Language: English
- Publisher: Andre Deutsch (UK); Arcade (US)
- Publication date: 1989 (UK); 1998 (US)
- Publication place: United Kingdom
- Media type: Print
- Pages: 288
- ISBN: 0-233-98392-9

Ripley Bogle is the debut novel of Northern Irish author Robert McLiam Wilson, published in 1989 in the UK although not until 1998 in the US. Written when he was 24, it is arguably his most acclaimed, winning the Rooney Prize and the Hughes Prize in 1989, and a Betty Trask Award and the Irish Book Awards the following year. Many elements of the novel are autobiographical; the author himself was born in Belfast, attended Cambridge University, dropped out and became homeless. It is regarded as a significant novel, producing "both a re-evaluation of Northern Irish literary identity, and an alternative perspective on the Troubles."

== Plot introduction ==
The novel is set over four days in London, where homeless 22-year-old Ripley Bogle aimlessly wanders the streets and, with angry satire, reflects on his life, directly addressing the reader. There are frequent flashbacks to growing up on the Turf Lodge estate in West Belfast during The Troubles, his move to Cambridge University and his subsequent decline into homelessness.

== Reception ==
- "An astonishing performance, fluent, profound, angry. It made me laugh; it made me think; it made me envious." – The Irish Times
- "Ripley Bogle is probably one of the best Irish novels to have appeared in the last decade. It goes straight for the jugular." The Times
- Zachary Leader in the London Review of Books compares the lead character novel to John Self and Charles Highway in Martin Amis's Money and The Rachel Papers: "Ripley Bogle isn't as good a novel as The Rachel Papers, let alone Money, but its author has talent and nerve". He goes on to say "Wilson is a writer worth watching – for all the present novel's indebtedness and clamouring, bumptious self-regard."
- Liam Callanan in the New York Times writes "The shadow of Ulysses looms large throughout the novel, since Bogle's wisecracking ramblings around London over the course of a long weekend draw a clear parallel to Bloom's wanderings through Dublin, almost to the point of parody." and concludes "By detailing the painful minutiae of homeless existence with aching accuracy, Bogle succeeds in making the impersonal hostility of street life in London seem almost as cruel as the intimate terror of Belfast. He is unsettlingly deadpan in his descriptions of one horrific episode after another, but making readers uncomfortable seems to be precisely Wilson's aim. What better way to evoke a world of senseless, skittish violence than to disconcert the reader with a challenging – and puzzling – narrator? And what better way to leave the reader truly puzzled than by tossing in a series of gratuitous twists at the end of the novel?"

== Stage adaptations ==
It was adapted for the stage in 1997 at Theatre503 when it was directed by Richard Hurst and again in 2005 when adapted by actor Sean O Tarpaigh (at Camden People's Theatre).
