= Ciarán Collins =

Irish writer (born 1977)

Ciarán Collins (born 1977 in Cork) is an Irish novelist and playwright. He won the 2013 Rooney Prize for Irish Literature for The Gamal, a dark novel set in a fictional town of Ballyronan in West Cork about an intense friendship of the eponymous narrator with fellow outsiders James and Sinéad. The traumatized teenager records his experiences as instructed by his psychiatrist.

== Life ==
He graduated from University College Cork. He teaches Irish and English at Hamilton High School, Bandon. He participated in and is a fan of hurling, one of the two national sporting games of Ireland.

== Works ==
- The Gamal. London: Bloomsbury Circus, 2013 ISBN 9781608198757
- Primal 2019
