= One Day as a Tiger =

1997 novel by Anne Haverty

- First edition cover, with quote from Barbara Trapido
- Author: Anne Haverty
- Cover artist: Jeremy Walker
- Language: English
- Publisher: Chatto & Windus
- Publication date: March 1997
- Publication place: United Kingdom
- Media type: Print
- Awards: Rooney Prize for Irish Literature
- ISBN: 0-7011-6628-2

One Day as a Tiger is the first novel by Irish author Anne Haverty. Published in 1997 it was shortlisted for the Whitbread First Novel Award that year and won the Rooney Prize for Irish Literature.

== Title ==
As explained in the preface to the book, the title comes from a Tibetan proverb:

It is better to have lived one day as a tiger than a thousand years as a sheep.

== Plot ==
After the death of his parents in a road accident as they travelled to visit him, Marty leaves his academic career at Trinity College, Dublin and returns to the family farm in County Tipperary, where he has an uncertain relationship with his brother Pierce, and becomes increasingly infatuated by Etti, his sister-in-law. Marty also finds his heart moved by Missy, a genetically engineered sheep who refuses to associate with the rest of the flock and enjoys "music, porridge and laconic stories". Eventually Etti and Marty travel to France with Missy in order to ensure her future at the Brigitte Bardot Foundation for the Welfare and Protection of Animals, but they only get as far as Deauville.

== Reception ==
- Kirkus Reviews is positive "Irish poet and screenwriter Haverty revisits the old theme of killing the thing you love. Her version comes in a spare, wry debut about a young man who willfully brings ruin upon himself and his brother." and concludes "The plot dances along at a brisk clip as Haverty's precise language beautifully captures her eccentric, isolated cast of rural characters in what's hardly a trail-blazing but nevertheless a promising first novel."
- Colm Toibin was effusive "A novel written with enormous confidence and flair. It has a lightness and a sense of comic timing which is absent from most contemporary Irish fiction, but it also has a real sense of darkness and the grotesque"
