= Desmond Hogan =

Irish writer (born 1950)

- Born: 10 December 1950 (age 75)
- Education: University College Dublin (UCD)
- Occupation: Writer
- Writing career
- Genres: Novel, Play, Short Story, Travel Writing
- Notable work: The Ikon-Maker
- Notable awards: Rooney Prize for Irish Literature; 1977; John Llewellyn Rhys Prize; 1980

Desmond Hogan (born 10 December 1950) is an Irish writer. Awarded the 1977 Rooney Prize for Irish Literature and 1980 John Llewellyn Rhys Prize, his oeuvre comprises novels, plays, short stories and travel writing.

The Cork Examiner said: "Like no other Irish writer just now, Hogan sets down what it's like to be a disturbed child of what seems a Godforsaken country in these troubled times." The Irish Independent said he is "to be commended for the fidelity and affection he shows to the lonely and the downtrodden." The Boston Globe said there "is something mannered in Hogan's prose, which is festooned with exotic imagery and scattered in sentence fragments."

A contemporary of Bruce Chatwin, Ian McEwan, Peter Carey, Salman Rushdie and a close friend of Kazuo Ishiguro, he has since vanished off the literary scene. In October 2009, he was placed on the sexual offenders list.

== Biography ==
Hogan was born in Ballinasloe in east County Galway. His father was a draper. Educated locally at St. Grellan's Boys' National School and St. Joseph's College, Garbally Park, some of his earliest work was published in The Fountain, the Garbally college annual.

After leaving school, Hogan travelled to France, ending up in Paris just after the student riots of 1968. He later studied at University College Dublin (UCD), where he received a BA in 1972 and an MA in 1973.

In 1971 he won the Hennessy Award. The Irish Writers' Co-operative, formed by the writers Fred Johnston, Neil Jordan and playwright Peter Sheridan at a meeting in a Dublin restaurant, were to publish Hogan's The Ikon Maker, which was also the Co-op's first publication. While in Dublin, he worked as a street actor and had a number of plays – A Short Walk to the Sea, Sanctified Distances, and The Squat – produced in the Abbey Theatre and the Project Arts Centre. RTÉ and BBC Radio broadcast some of his plays, including Jimmy. He also published stories in small magazines such as Adam and the Transatlantic Review.

Later he moved to London, living in Tooting, Catford and Hounslow and then later as a lodger in the Hampstead home of Anthony Farrell, a young Irish publisher. Friends and acquaintances from this period included: writer Jaci Stephen, biographer Patrick Newley, Kazuo Ishiguro and his partner, Lorna. Hogan also participated in poetry and literature readings held at Bernard Stone's Turrett Bookshop on Floral Street in Covent Garden.

His debut novel, The Ikon-Maker, was written in 1974 and published in 1976. It deals with a mother's unwilling recognition of her son's homosexuality.

In 1977, he was the recipient of the Rooney Prize for Irish Literature, though this event remained undiscovered in America for several years until the Pittsburgh Press reported the revelation to its readers in 1981. In 1978, he participated in the Santa Cruz Writers Conference. In the early 1980s, Hogan was represented by Deborah Rogers' literary agency, which also had Peter Carey, Bruce Chatwin, Ian McEwan and Salman Rushdie on its books. In 1980, he won the John Llewellyn Rhys Prize for his Diamonds at the Bottom of the Sea collection of short stories. In 1981, he appeared in Granta.

In 1989, Hogan left London and was a Hudson Strode Fellow at the University of Alabama. In 1991, Hogan was awarded a place on the DAAD (German Academic Exchange) Berlin Artists' Programme fellowship which enabled him to live in that city. It was in Berlin that he fell in love with a young man called Sammy (who died, apparently of AIDS-related illness, a few years later), with whom he travelled. These travels together yielded a collection of travel writing, The Edge of the City: A Scrapbook 1976-1991, in 1993. After this, Hogan moved on to Prague, grief-stricken, where he wrote Farewell to Prague (1995).

Hogan returned to Ireland in 1995, living in Clifden, County Galway. For a period, he lived in an old caravan in County Limerick along North Kerry/West Limerick border. In 1997, he lectured in short fiction at the University of California, San Diego.

He was a judge in the 2005 Frank O'Connor International Short Story Award, worth €50,000.

Interested in history, painting, and traveller culture, he has used a typewriter since he was a child and finds the modern transition to computers difficult. Suspicious of the telephone, he prefers to communicate using postcards.

== Sexual assault ==
Hogan was convicted of sexually assaulting a 15-year-old boy. The assault happened on 11 November 2006 in a house Hogan was renting. He was given a two-year suspended jail sentence, placed on the sex offenders register, and ordered not to have unsupervised contact with children. The judge, Carroll Moran, made the judgement that there was a "moderate to low" likelihood of recidivism for Hogan. However, Hogan's parole officer, Nora Brassil, stated in an earlier hearing that Hogan saw the assault as "a mutual sexual incident/ relationship". She was concerned that if Hogan did not see what he had done as wrong, he might transgress again.

== Readings ==
- 1970s: Participated in readings in The Sarsfield Bar, Rutland Street. Limerick. Organised by John Liddy.
- 26 July 1989: Galway Arts Centre, Galway Arts Festival.
- 2002: Sean Dunne Literary Festival
- 21–22 September 2002: Annual International Frank O'Connor Festival of the Short Story
- 8 July 2004. Dublin. Launch of Munster Literature Centre journal Southword
- 2004: Galway County Library
- 20 April 2005: Cúirt International Festival of Literature, Galway (along with Ronan Bennett)

== Legacy ==
Hogan features in a number of major anthologies of modern Irish literature.

William Trevor included him in The Oxford Book of Irish Stories and Colm Tóibín selected his story "Winter Swimmers" for The Penguin Book of Irish Writing.

He appears in The Anchor Book of New Irish Writing.

He appears in the anthology Best European Fiction 2012, edited by Aleksandar Hemon, with a preface by Nicole Krauss (Dalkey Archive Press).

Another Irish writer Colum McCann, claims that Hogan, along with Benedict Kiely, is one of two Irish writers who have influenced him greatly.

Joyce Carol Oates, an American writer, much admires his story "Winter Swimmers".

According to Robert McCrum, former Literary Editor of The Observer, Hogan is "one of Ireland's finest writers".

== Awards and honours ==
- 1971 Hennessy Award
- 1977 Rooney Prize for Irish Literature
- 1980 John Llewellyn Rhys Prize

== List of works ==
=== Novels ===
The Ikon Maker

- Dublin, Co-Op Books, 1976
- London: Writers and Readers Publishing Cooperative, 1979, ISBN 0-904613-55-0
- New York: Braziller, 1979, ISBN 0-8076-0929-3
- London: Pulsiver, 1987, ISBN 0-948849-00-2 (PB)
- London: Faber and Faber, 1993, ISBN 0-571-16768-3 (PB)

The Leaves on Grey

- London, Hamish Hamilton, 1980, ISBN 0-241-10364-9
- New York: Braziller, 1980, ISBN 0-8076-0948-X
- Thorndike Press, USA, 1980 ISBN 0-89621-258-0 (Large Type)
- London: Pan Books, 1981, ISBN 0-330-26287-4

A Curious Street

- London: Hamish Hamilton, 1984, ISBN 0-241-10758-X
- New York: Braziller, 1984, ISBN 0-8076-1099-2 (HB)
- London: Pan, 1985, ISBN 0-241-10758-X (PB)
  - Published in German as: Eine merkwürdige Straße, Frankfurt am Main: Suhrkamp, 1997, ISBN 3-518-40827-5

A New Shirt

- London: Hamish Hamilton, 1986
- London: Faber and Faber, 1987, ISBN 0-571-14911-1

A Farewell to Prague

- London: Faber and Faber, 1995, ISBN 0-571-17427-2
- Champaign, London, Dublin: Dalkey Archive Press, 2013, ISBN 9781564788542

=== Short story collections ===
Diamonds at the Bottom of the Sea and Other Stories

- London: Hamish Hamilton, 1979, ISBN 0-241-10123-9 (HB)
- New York: Braziller, 1980, ISBN 0-8076-0934-X (HB)

Children of Lir: Stories from Ireland

- London: Hamish Hamilton, 1981, ISBN 0-241-10608-7
- New York: Braziller, 1981.

Stories: the Diamonds at the Bottom of the Sea, Children of Lir

- London: Picador, 1982, ISBN 0-330-26624-1 (PB)

The Mourning Thief and Other Stories

- London, Faber and Faber, 1987

Lebanon Lodge

- London: Faber and Faber, 1988
- London: Faber and Faber, 1989, ISBN 0-571-15313-5 (PB)

A Link With the River. Stories

- [US edition of The Mourning Thief and Lebanon Lodge]
- New York: Farrar, Straus, Giroux, 1989, ISBN 0-374-18461-5 (HB), ISBN 0-374-53003-3 (PB)

Elysium: Stories

- Berlin: Aufbau-Verlag, 1995, ISBN 3-351-02817-2

Lark's Eggs: New and Selected Stories

- Dublin: The Lilliput Press, 2005, ISBN 1-84351-071-5

Old Swords and other stories

- Dublin: The Lilliput Press, 2009, ISBN 978-1-84351-144-1

The House of Mourning and Other Stories

- Champaign, London, Dublin: Dalkey Archive Press, 2013, ISBN 9781564788559

The History of Magpies

- Dublin: The Lilliput Press, 2017, ISBN 9781843516668

=== Travel writing ===
The Edge of the city: A Scrapbook 1976–91

- Dublin: The Lilliput Press, 1993, ISBN 1-874675-03-1
- London: Faber & Faber, 1993, ISBN 0-571-16881-7

=== Plays ===
A Short Walk to the Sea (1976)

- staged by the Abbey Theatre, Dublin on 20 October 1976.
- published with Paschal Finnan's The Swine and the Potswalloper, by Co-Op Books, Dublin in 1979.

Sanctified Distances (1976)

- staged by the Abbey Theatre, Dublin on 9 December 1976.

The Squat (1976)

- Performed at the Project Arts Centre's Festival, Dublin in 1976.

The Mourning Thief (TV)

- his first television play.

The Ikon Maker (1980)

- staged by Green Fields and Far Away Theatre Company, touring UK 1980.

=== Contributions and introductions in edited volumes, journals, magazines, etc. ===
in: Kevin Casey (ed.), Winter's Tales From Ireland 2, Dublin: Gill and Macmillan, 1972, ISBN 0-7171-0592-X

"The Birth of Laughter", in Joseph Hone (ed), Irish Ghost Stories, London: Hamish Hamilton, 1977, ISBN 0-241-89680-0

"Southern Birds", in: Granta (1980) 3, ISBN 0-14-014577-X

in: T. J. Binding (ed.), Firebird 1: Writing Today, London: Penguin/Allen Lane, 1982.

"Alan's Novel", in: Robin Robertson (ed.), Firebird 3, London: Penguin, 1984, ISBN 0-14-006797-3

Introduction to Kate O'Brien's, Without my cloak, London: Virago, 1984, ISBN 0-86068-760-0 pbk (also Harmondsworth: Penguin 1987, ISBN 0-14-016155-4 and London: Virago, 2001, ISBN 0-86068-760-0)

"The Tipperary Fanale", in: Judy Cooke & Elizabeth Bunster (eds.), The Best of Fiction Magazine, London: J.M. Dent, 1986, pp. 236–249, ISBN 0-460-02464-7

"Guy "Micko" Delaney" (novelette), in: Robin Baird-Smith (ed.), Winter’s Tales, New Series: 4, New York: St. Martin’s Press, 1988, pp. 21–45, ISBN 0-312-02480-0

"The cold wind and the warm", in: Alberto Manguel & Craig Stephenson (eds), In another part of the forest : an anthology of gay short fiction, New York: Crown Trade Paperbacks, 1994, ISBN 0-517-88156-X

David Marcus (ed.), Alternative Loves: Irish Gay and Lesbian Stories, Dublin: Martello Books, 1994, ISBN 1-86023-001-6

"Jimmy", in: David Leavitt & Mark Mitchell (eds.), The Penguin Book of Gay Short Stories, New York: Viking, 1994, ISBN 0-670-85152-3 (republished in 2004, ISBN 0-14-101005-3)

"A Curious Street", in: Dermot Bolger (ed.), The Vintage Book of Contemporary Irish Fiction, New York: Vintage, 1995, ISBN 0-679-76546-8

"Afternoon", in: Steve MacDonagh (ed.), Brandon Book of Irish Short Stories, Dingle: Brandon, 1998, ISBN 0-86322-237-4

"A country dance", in: Colm Tóibín (ed.), The Penguin Book of Irish Fiction, London: Penguin, 1999, ISBN 0-14-029849-5 and ISBN 0-670-89108-8

"The bombs", in: John Somer and John J. Daly (eds.), Anchor Book of New Irish Writing: The New Gaelach Ficsean, Anchor, 2000, ISBN 0-385-49889-6

"Eine seltsame Straße", in: Dirck Linck (ed.), Sodom ist kein Vaterland. Literarische Streifzüge durch das schwule Europa, Berlin: Querverlag, 2001, pp. 175–182, ISBN 3-89656-066-2

"Airedale", in: William Trevor (ed.), The Oxford Book of Irish Short Stories, Oxford: Oxford UP, 2002, ISBN 0-19-280193-7

Andrew O'Hagan and Colm Tóibín, New Writing 11, Picador 2002, ISBN 0-330-48597-0

"Barnacle Geese", in: Sebastian Barker (ed.), The London Magazine, June/July 2004, ISSN 0024-6085

"Iowa", in: Sebastian Barker (ed.), The London Magazine, February/March 2005, ISSN 0024-6085

"Rose of Lebanon", in: Rebecca Bengal (ed.), American Short Fiction, Issue 33, Winter 2006, ISSN 1051-4813

"Shelter", in: Sebastian Barker (ed.), The London Magazine, February/March 2005, ISSN 0024-6085

"The Hare's Purse", in: Stacey Swann, Rebecca Bengal, Jill Meyers (ed.), American Short Fiction, Issue 38, Summer 2007, ISSN 1051-4813
