= Elizabeth Reapy =

Irish writer

- Writing career
- Genre: Fiction
- Notable work: Red Dirt
- Notable awards: Rooney Prize

Elizabeth Reapy is an Irish writer. She won the 2017 Rooney Prize for Irish Literature.

== Life ==
She graduated from NUI Galway, University College Cork, and Queen's University Belfast.

She edited the 2012 30 Under 30: A selection of short fiction by thirty young Irish writers.

== Works ==
- Red Dirt, Head of Zeus 2016.
