= Caitriona Lally =

Irish writer

Caitríona Lally
- Education: Trinity College Dublin
- Writing career
- Genre: Fiction
- Notable work: Eggshells

Caitríona Lally is an Irish writer. She has published two novels: Eggshells (2017) and Wunderland (2021). In 2018 she was awarded the Rooney Prize for Irish Literature.

== Biography ==
Lally studied English literature at Trinity College Dublin. After graduating in 2004, she taught English in Japan and spent time travelling abroad. She then worked as a copywriter, and as a home aide in New York.

Lally began work on her first novel Eggshells in 2011, during a period of unemployment. Eggshells tells the story of Vivian, an enchanting outsider who believes herself to be a changeling and roams the streets of Dublin in search of belonging. The book explores ideas of home and the meaning of society. Lally worked on Eggshells while working a job in data entry. She entered the manuscript into the 2014 Novel Fair Competition held by the Irish Writers Centre in Dublin, and won the chance to pitch it to agents and publishers. The opportunity secured her an agent and a book deal, and the novel was published in 2015. Eggshells was shortlisted for the Newcomer Award at the 2015 Irish Book Awards and the Kate O’Brien Debut Novel Award. In 2015, Lally received a Literature Bursary from the Arts Council, which enabled her to start research for her second novel.

She performed a spoken word piece in the 2016 Dublin Port project Starboard Home.

Wunderland was published in September 2021. It follows Roy, exiled from Ireland to Hamburg, where he works as a cleaner at an exhibition of miniatures. On writing the novel, Lally said, "Writing Wunderland was a chance for me to indulge my obsessions with trains and all things miniature, and to explore two characters coming at life from very different perspectives."

Lally and her husband, who works for the Irish government, live in Dublin with their family. Alongside her writing, Lally works as a cleaner at Trinity College Dublin.

== Bibliography ==
- Eggshells. Melville House, 2017. ISBN 9781612195971
- Wunderland, New Island Books, 2021.

== Awards ==
- 2014: Irish Writers Centre Novel Fair, finalist
- 2018: Rooney Prize for Irish Literature for Eggshells
- 2019: Lannan Literary Fellowship
