= Robert McLiam Wilson =

Northern Irish novelist and journalist (born 1964)

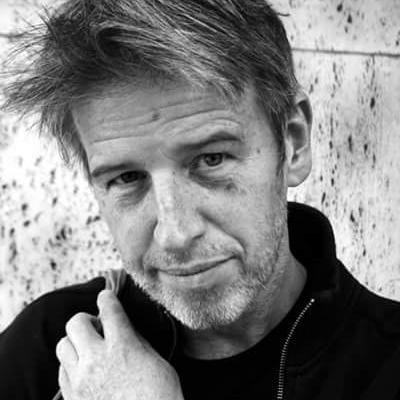
- Belfast-born author, Robert McLiam Wilson
- Born: Robert Wilson; 24 February 1964 (age 62); Belfast, Northern Ireland
- Education: St Malachy's College; St Catharine's College, Cambridge
- Occupations: Novelist; journalist
- Writing career
- Language: English
- Genres: Crime; Thriller; Satire
- Notable works: Ripley Bogle; Eureka Street
- Notable awards: Betty Trask Award; Rooney Prize

Robert McLiam Wilson (born Robert Wilson, 24 February 1964) is a Northern Irish novelist.

== Biography ==
He was born in the New Lodge district of Belfast and then moved to Turf Lodge and other places in the city.

He attended St Malachy's College and studied English at St Catharine's College, Cambridge; however, he dropped out and, for a short time, was homeless. This period of his life profoundly affected his later life and influenced his works.

Wilson moved to Paris where he writes for Charlie Hebdo and Libération. He also writes occasionally for The Guardian, Corriere della Sera and Le Monde.

== Work ==
McLiam Wilson has written three novels: Ripley Bogle (1989), Manfred's Pain (1992), Eureka Street (1996)

Ripley Bogle is a novel about a homeless man in London. Eureka Street focuses on the lives of two Belfast friends, one Catholic and one Protestant, shortly before and after the IRA ceasefires in 1994. A BBC TV adaptation of Eureka Street was broadcast in 1999.

He is also the author of a non-fiction book about poverty, The Dispossessed (1992), and has made television documentaries for the BBC. His next novel, Extremists, has been postponed again and again.

== Critical review ==
His work has been described as 'strikingly original' and as 'one of the most influential literary voices to emerge from Northern Ireland since the Troubles began [who has] challenged the understanding of contemporary Irishness'.

== Awards ==
In 2003, he was named by Granta magazine as one of 20 "Best of Young British Novelists", despite the fact that he has not published new work in English since 1996.

Ripley Bogle won the Rooney Prize and the Hughes Prize in 1989, and a Betty Trask Award and the Irish Book Award in 1990.

== Biblio ==
- Ripley Bogle (1989)
- Manfred's Pain (1992)
- Eureka Street (1996)[(-φ)]
