= How Harry Became a Tree =

2001 drama film by Goran Paskaljević

- Directed by: Goran Paskaljević
- Based on: Lao Dan is a Tree by Yang Zhengguang
- Starring: Colm Meaney; Adrian Dunbar
- Cinematography: Milan Spasić
- Music by: Stefano Arnaldi
- Production company: Paradox Pictures Limited
- Release date: 13 September 2001 (TIFF)
- Running time: 99 minutes
- Countries: Italy; France; United Kingdom; Ireland
- Language: English

How Harry Became a Tree, also released as Bitter Harvest, is a 2001 drama film directed by Goran Paskaljević and starring Colm Meaney, Adrian Dunbar and Cillian Murphy. It is based on the Chinese novel Lao Dan is a Tree (Chinese: 老丹是一棵树, 1998) by Yang Zhengguang and deals allegorically with the Irish Civil War and Yugoslav Wars.

== Plot ==
In rural Ireland in 1924, Harry Maloney, believing "a man is measured by his enemies", nurses an unjustified enmity for George O'Flaherty, who owns the local pub and most of the businesses in the area and is the local matchmaker. When Harry's son Gus, upon whom Harry regularly heaps mental and verbal abuse falls for George's maidservant, Eileen, George helps put the two together. George's seduction of Eileen gives Harry the opportunity to create a scandal, despite the effect on his own family.

== Cast ==
- Colm Meaney as Harry Maloney
- Adrian Dunbar as George
- Cillian Murphy as Gus Maloney
- Kerry Condon as Eileen
- Pat Laffan as Father O'Connor
- Gail Fitzpatrick as Margaret

== Reception ==
Reviewing the film in Hot Press, Craig Fitzsimons wrote "though flawed, How Harry Became A Tree would probably qualify as the most effective example of homegrown bucolic melodrama since Neil Jordan's The Butcher Boy adaptation".

The New York Times wrote that it was "a comic and improbably loving meditation on hate, absurdist but never abstract, using Ireland in 1924 as a stand-in for the former Yugoslavia."
