= Rooney Prize for Irish Literature =

Irish literary award for Irish authors of under 40 years

The Rooney Prize for Irish Literature is a literary award conferred each year recognising an outstanding body of work by an Irish writer under forty years of age.

The award was created in 1976 by the Irish American businessman Dan Rooney, owner and chairman of the NFL Pittsburgh Steelers franchise and former US Ambassador to Ireland. The prize is administered by the Oscar Wilde Centre. Although often associated with individual books, it is intended to reward a body of work. Originally worth £750, the current value of the prize is €10,000.

== List of recipients ==
- 1976: Heno Magee
- 1977: Desmond Hogan
- 1978: Peter Sheridan
- 1979: Kate Cruise O'Brien, A Gift Horse (short stories)
- 1980: Bernard Farrell
- 1981: Neil Jordan
- 1982: Medbh McGuckian; Special prize awarded to Seán Ó Tuama and Thomas Kinsella for An Duanaire / Poems of the Dispossessed
- 1983: Dorothy Nelson, In Night's City (novel)
- 1984: Ronan Sheehan
- 1985: Frank McGuinness, Observe the Sons of Ulster Marching Towards the Somme (play)
- 1986: Paul Mercier
- 1987: Deirdre Madden, Hidden Symptoms (novel)
- 1988: Glenn Patterson, Burning Your Own (novel)
- 1989: Robert McLiam Wilson, Ripley Bogle (novel)
- 1990: Mary Dorcey, A Noise from the Woodshed (short stories)
- 1991: Anne Enright, The Portable Virgin (short stories)
- 1992: Hugo Hamilton
- 1993: Gerard Fanning (poet)
- 1994: Colum McCann, Fishing the Sloe-Black River (short stories)
- 1995: Philip MacCann, The Miracle Shed (short stories)
- 1996: Mike McCormack, Getting It in the Head (short stories); additional Special Award presented to Vona Groarke and Conor O'Callaghan
- 1997: Anne Haverty, One Day as a Tiger (novel)
- 1998: David Wheatley, Thirst (poems)
- 1999: Mark O'Rowe, Howie the Rookie (play)
- 2000: Claire Keegan, Antarctica (short stories), Special award presented to David Marcus.
- 2001: Keith Ridgway, Standard Time (short stories)
- 2002: Caitríona O’Reilly, The Nowhere Birds (poems)
- 2003: Eugene O'Brien, Eden (play)
- 2004: Claire Kilroy, All Summer (novel)
- 2005: Nick Laird, To a Fault (poems)
- 2006: Philip Ó Ceallaigh, Notes from a Turkish Whorehouse (short stories)
- 2007: Kevin Barry, There Are Little Kingdoms (short stories)
- 2008: Leontia Flynn, Drives (poems)
- 2009: Kevin Power, Bad Day in Blackrock
- 2010: Leanne O'Sullivan, Cailleach: The Hag Of Beara
- 2011: Lucy Caldwell
- 2012: Nancy Harris
- 2013: Ciarán Collins
- 2014: Colin Barrett
- 2015: Sara Baume
- 2016: Doireann Ní Ghríofa
- 2017: Elizabeth Reapy
- 2018: Caitriona Lally
- 2019: Mark O'Connell
- 2020: Stephen Sexton, If All the World and Love Were Young
- 2021: Niamh Campbell, This Happy
- 2022: Seán Hewitt
- 2023: Michael Magee, Close to Home
- 2024: Suad Aldarra, I Don't Want to Talk About Home
- 2025: Ferdia Lennon, Glorious Exploits
