= Eureka Street (novel) =

1996 novel by Robert McLiam Wilson

- First edition
- Author: Robert McLiam Wilson
- Language: English
- Publisher: Secker & Warburg (UK); Arcade (US)
- Publication date: 1996 (UK); 1997 (US)
- Publication place: United Kingdom
- Media type: Print
- Pages: 384
- ISBN: 0-436-20284-0

Eureka Street is a novel by Northern Irish author Robert McLiam Wilson, published in 1996 in the UK (1997 in the US), it focuses on the lives of two Belfast friends, one Catholic and one Protestant, shortly before and after the IRA ceasefire in 1994. A BBC TV adaptation of Eureka Street was broadcast in 1999.

== Plot Introduction ==
Eureka Street concerns two working-class Belfast men who, despite being Catholic and Protestant respectively, are friends. The novel switches back and forth between Chuckie Lurgan's third-person narrative and Jake Jackson's first-person narrative. United by their inability to form mature relationships, they struggle to find love and stability in bomb-torn Belfast. The book is set in 1990s, amid peace negotiations and possible cease-fires. In a 1999 interview with Robert Mcliam, Wilson said he "wanted to avoid writing a novel in which anyone knew the names of the guns, and I wanted to write about violence responsibly, but in particular what I really wanted to do was to show the weight of a human life lost." The book follows both Jake, the Catholic, and Chuckie, the Protestant, along their lives in Belfast. Towards the end of the book, both find their lives affected by the 'Fountain Street Bombing'.

== Characters ==
Chuckie Lurgan - Second Protagonist (his chapters are narrated in 3rd person). Chuckie is an overweight, thirty-year-old Protestant who has lived his whole life in Belfast. After he celebrates his thirtieth birthday, he realizes that his life has been wasted. Through numerous crazy ideas, he becomes a wealthy entrepreneur. He usually displays shock at his own talent for making money and often acts in ways that, despite his wealth, reveal his poor upbringing. He falls in love with an American woman named Max who becomes pregnant with his child.

Jake Jackson - First Protagonist (also a narrator). Jake is a reformed hard man who lives alone with his cat. Despite his rough exterior and job as a repo-man and a construction worker, Jake is a sensitive romantic who is heart broken after his English girlfriend, Sarah, leaves him. He opens the book with the line "All stories are love stories" (ES 1) and continues, through the novel, to search for love. He has many run-ins with Aoirghe, an extremely Irish Republican who is under the misconception that Jake had been a victim of police violence. They eventually start dating.

Mary and Paul - A waitress at a bar who goes home with Jake a few times, though she calls it off eventually, stating that she isn't willing to leave her boyfriend, Paul. Paul is the cop that beats up Jake, though he doesn't go beyond roughing Jake up. Jake comments that he admires 'his self-control'.

Crab, Hally, and Allen - Crab and Hally worked with Jake as repo-men. They are very violent. Allen was his boss.

Mamie and Matt - An older couple who fostered Jake and several other young men. They genuinely like their foster sons and most of the sons like them back. They had seventeen in all. They were also friends with Sarah and were worried when she left Jake.

Aoirghe Jenkins - An Irish Republican with an Irish first name and a very dull last name. She first met Jake when she went on a double date with her friend Max, who would eventually end up with Jake's friend Chuckie. She and Jake did not hit it off but she was infuriated when Jake mentioned his run in with Paul, believing it had to do with Jake being Catholic. After their date, she makes several attempts to draw Jake into talking about his police violence. He refuses, which makes her even more angry. After a violent protest injures Roche, she is verbally attacked by Jake but eventually they become romantically involved.

Max - Max's father was a peace talker who was shot in an Irish airport after traveling there to help settle the Troubles. Her mother is a socialite who had left Max's father for his brother. After her father's death, Max ran away from home and lived a wild lifestyle of drugs and sex. Max returned home only to sleep with her Uncle/Step-father before running away again. She eventually lived with her grandparents who calmed her down enough that she began to attend college at UCLA. She befriended a professor whose wife had died but the relationship didn't last. She left America and ended up in Belfast where she ran into Chuckie. They entered a relationship but when she became pregnant, she left for America. Chuckie followed her and convinced her to marry him.

Peggy and Caroline - Peggy Lurgan is Chuckie's mother and Caroline is her best friend and lover, though Chuckie doesn't find this out until the end of the novel.

Slat, Donal, and Septic Ted - Friends of Chuckie and Jake.

Luke Findlater - Chuckie's business partner.

Roche - A young, abused boy who lives in Belfast. He loves cursing and idolizes Chuckie. He stayed briefly with Jake before leaving again. He is entered into the foster care system after being injured.

== Reception ==
- Peter Guttridge writing in The Observer concludes "Wilson has a pleasurably flexible, easy-going narrative style. Eureka Street is very funny but that isn't all. At the start of it, Jake is 'thrillingly ecumenical', and this novel is ecumenical, too ecumenical with the truths the competing political parties offer and satirically cynical of them all."
- Sarah Ferguson in The New York Times writes "this long-winded, rambling tale, though well written in places, is sadly off the mark. An ill-advised mishmash of halfhearted jokes, trite sentimentality, absurd plot twists and what passes for earnest political rhetoric, Eureka Street lurches along uncertainly through a series of random misadventures as it traces six months in the lives of a group of loutish working-class 30-somethings".
