= The Journey (2016 film) =

2016 film by Nick Hamm

- Theatrical release poster
- Directed by: Nick Hamm
- Written by: Colin Bateman
- Produced by: Mark Huffam; Nick Hamm; Piers Tempest
- Starring: Timothy Spall; Colm Meaney; Toby Stephens; Catherine McCormack; Freddie Highmore; John Hurt
- Cinematography: Greg Gardiner
- Edited by: Chris Gill
- Music by: Stephen Warbeck
- Production companies: Greenroom Entertainment; Tempo Productions Limited
- Distributed by: Shear Entertainment (United Kingdom); Wildcard Distribution (Ireland)
- Release date: 7 September 2016 (Venice)
- Running time: 94 minutes
- Countries: United Kingdom; Ireland
- Language: English
- Box office: $471,342

The Journey is a 2016 political drama film directed and produced by Nick Hamm, from a screenplay by Colin Bateman. The film is a fictional account of the true story of how political enemies Ian Paisley and Martin McGuinness formed an unlikely political alliance in the lead up to the St Andrews Agreement. It stars Timothy Spall as Paisley and Colm Meaney as McGuinness, with Freddie Highmore, John Hurt, Toby Stephens, and Ian Beattie in supporting roles.

An international co-production between the United Kingdom and the Republic of Ireland, the film premiered at the 73rd Venice International Film Festival as a Special Presentation. It was released theatrically in the UK and Ireland on May 5, 2017. It received mixed-to-positive critical reviews, though the performances of Spall and Meaney were widely praised. Meaney won an IFTA Award for Best Lead Actor – Film.

== Plot ==
In October 2006, the Northern Ireland peace process is debating a new agreement in St Andrews, Scotland. Ian Paisley and Martin McGuinness meet for the first time and the negotiations begin. Paisley needs to return to his wife in Northern Ireland for his 50th wedding anniversary. Bad weather closes the nearby airport, so it is suggested that Paisley be driven to another airport where a private jet will take him home. McGuinness allows the change in plans but only if he travels in the car and plane with Paisley.

The two enemies are then driven in a van for a number of hours. Unbeknownst to either of them, MI5 is listening in with a spy camera and microphone, and can communicate with the young driver, who is given leeway to speak to his passengers and encourage discussion.

Paisley and McGuinness remain implacable to one another in defense of their actions. Paisley sees McGuinness as a terrorist and murderer, while McGuinness sees Paisley as a man who used his influence and power to encourage violence. McGuinness, seeing his past as part of a broader civil war that might soon be over, continues to speak to Paisley in the hope that they can seal a permanent peace agreement. In St Andrews, Tony Blair and MI5 agents watch the conversation with interest.

The driver is then instructed by MI5 to take a diversion into a forest. This, along with the departure of a security detail following the van, begins to raise suspicions in McGuinness. Suddenly the van driver hits the brakes and the vehicle slides into a stack of timber next to the road, piercing a tyre. The driver claims to have hit a deer but McGuinness and Paisley see no blood on the front of the car. While McGuinness and Paisley wander in the woods and continue to talk, the driver speaks urgently to MI5 and reveals that he does not know how to change a flat tyre.

In the woods, the two enemies continue to argue their points and defend their actions to one another. McGuinness also begins to wonder if this has been planned, with the possibility that one or both of them might be assassinated in a forest in the middle of nowhere. The discovery of the fatally wounded deer confirms to them both that their situation was not planned. When encouraged to kill the dying animal by Paisley, McGuinness picks up a heavy rock but eventually refuses to do the deed, surprising Paisley.

As the driver changes the tyre, the two then find their way to a disused Protestant church, where Paisley identifies various martyrs in the stained glass windows as being from Foxe's Book of Martyrs. They wander outside in a cemetery, and the topic of the Enniskillen bombing is brought up. Paisley rages at the IRA and McGuinness for the bombing, which killed innocent bystanders and not the soldiers that were being attacked. McGuinness admits that the bombing was wrong and that it caused the IRA to question its actions. He also reveals to Paisley the conversation he had with his young daughter about the bombing, and how it made him feel. Paisley responds viciously to McGuinness' honesty by claiming that he was crying crocodile tears.

The heated argument convinces McGuinness that there is no point continuing and he refuses to re-enter the van. Paisley then states that his own "bark" is worse than his "bite", which indicates to McGuinness that while Paisley may not be apologetic, he is at least conciliatory. The van drives off with both men inside. As the van gets nearer to the airport the driver realises they need fuel. They pull over at a service station but the driver's credit card no longer works since it was bent during the changing of the tyre. The driver asks McGuinness and Paisley if they have a credit card but they do not. At an impasse and needing to hurry, Paisley enters the service station and uses his fame and his public speaking voice to convince the clerk to try the driver's card again. This time the clerk keys in the card number and it works.

McGuinness and Paisley then walk back to the van, where McGuinness notices a hidden pistol in the driver's belt and confronts him. The driver then admits that he is with MI5 and that he is there to protect them, that he is in touch with them the whole time, but that their agenda is peaceful and directed at getting the two to talk. McGuinness tries to tell Paisley this, but Paisley has collapsed inside the van with angina. McGuinness helps Paisley to retrieve his medication and settles him down.

Reflecting upon the stained glass windows he saw in the church, Paisley then orders the van off the road and exits, speaking to McGuinness alone. He then speaks about how he saw himself as being a potential martyr for his cause but here he was at age 81 having suffered no violence. McGuinness encourages this line of thought, and tells him that if peace should come, Paisley's people will hate Paisley, and McGuinness' people would hate McGuinness, and that would be a courageous act.

The van enters a secure part of the airport and stops in a hangar with a private jet and a heavily armed security detail. The driver offers them a minute in private, which they accept, so the driver leaves. Paisley then issues an ultimatum to McGuinness: he will support the peace process and sign the accords if McGuinness offers an apology to him for all the actions of the IRA. McGuinness refuses, saying that he plays "the long game" and that any apology he might offer Paisley privately would go against everything he stands for, so he apologises for nothing. At this, Paisley smiles and praises McGuinness for being a real politician and never apologising. Paisley then says that he despises everything that McGuinness has done, but offers his hand. McGuinness says that he despises everything Paisley stands for, and the two shake hands as friends: the peace process is sealed. The film ends with actual pictures of Paisley and McGuinness working and smiling together as first and deputy ministers of Northern Ireland.

== Cast ==
- Timothy Spall as Ian Paisley
- Colm Meaney as Martin McGuinness
- Freddie Highmore as Jack the driver
- John Hurt as Harry Patterson
- Toby Stephens as Tony Blair
- Ian Beattie as Gerry Adams
- Catherine McCormack as Kate Elgar
- Ian McElhinney as Rory McBride
- Barry Ward as Ian Paisley Jr
- Kristy Robinson as Mary Lou McDonald

== Production ==
On 13 May 2015, it was reported that a film focusing on Ian Paisley and Martin McGuinness was in pre-production, with Liam Neeson and Kenneth Branagh attached to star. However, Timothy Spall was later reported to be in talks for the role of Paisley on 1 July 2015. In late August 2015, Colm Meaney joined Spall in the cast, portraying the role of McGuinness. On 10 September 2015, John Hurt, Freddie Highmore, and Toby Stephens were reported to have joined the cast of the film.

Principal photography began in Belfast, Northern Ireland on 30 September 2015. The first image of Spall and Meaney on set and in character was released on 5 October 2015.

== Release ==
The film was part of the Special Presentations lineup at the 2016 Toronto International Film Festival in September 2016. It was also screened at the 73rd Venice International Film Festival that same month. Shortly after, IFC Films acquired U.S distribution rights to the film.

== Reception ==
On review aggregator website Rotten Tomatoes, the film holds an approval rating of 69%, based on 80 reviews, and an average rating of 5.87/10. The website's critical consensus reads, "The Journey's narrative deficiencies undermine a powerful fact-based story, but those problems are often offset by solid work from Colm Meaney and Timothy Spall." On Metacritic, the film has a weighted average score of 53 out of 100, based on 21 critics, indicating "mixed or average reviews".

== See also ==
- St Andrews Agreement
