= El Perfecto Desconocido =

El Perfecto Desconocido or "The Perfect Stranger" is a 2011 film that was directed by Toni Bestard and stars Colm Meaney as the main character Mark O'Reilly. The film was shot in Mallorca.

== Plot ==
The mysterious arrival of a foreigner (Mark O'Reilly) to a small village in Spain awakes the sudden interest from a diverse group of residents. The residents of the village appear unexpectedly in the stranger's life, believing that he's going to reopen an old shop. In contrast, the real intentions of the stranger are hidden behind an old Polaroid photo, which has led him to that place in search of answers.

Despite speaking no Spanish, O'Reilly befriends a young man from an overprotective family and a young woman who gets in frequent scrapes and is pursued by the police at one point.

== Reception ==
Elizabeth Kerr of The Hollywood Reporter praises the cast for their strong character work, particularly praising Meaney for his "effortlessly understated" performance. Justin Chang of Variety magazine is positive about the cinematography and the cast, but says it is "not enough to elevate this predictable, tonally strained if technically competent effort."
