= Eureka Street (TV series) =

- Based on: Eureka Street by Robert McLiam Wilson
- Written by: Donna Franceschild
- Directed by: Adrian Shergold
- Starring: Vincent Regan; Mark Benton; Dervla Kirwan; Elisabeth Rohm
- Composer: Martin Phipps
- Country of origin: United Kingdom
- Original language: English
- No. of series: 1
- No. of episodes: 4

Production
- Executive producers: Robert Cooper; Debra Hauer; Claire Duignan
- Producer: Sophie Gardiner
- Production locations: Belfast, Northern Ireland, UK
- Running time: 4 x 60 minutes
- Production company: BBC Northern Ireland

Original release
- Network: BBC2
- Release: 13 September – 4 October 1999

Eureka Street is a BBC Northern Ireland 1999 adaptation to mini-series of Robert McLiam Wilson's 1996 novel of the same name. Set in Belfast in the six months before and after the 1994 ceasefire, it commences with an anonymous hand typing the words, "All stories are love stories." The novel opens with the same text.

== Plot ==
Set in the Northern Irish city of Belfast, the series follows the lives of two young men, Chuckie Lurgan (played by Mark Benton) and Jake Jackson (played by Vincent Regan), as they navigate the turbulent social and political landscape of the late 1990s. Chuckie is a lovable rogue who dreams of making it big, while Jake is a former soldier trying to come to terms with the violence he has experienced.

The series explores a range of themes including sectarianism, politics, and the complexities of modern Northern Irish society. As Chuckie and Jake navigate their way through the city's underworld, they encounter a diverse cast of characters, including loyalist paramilitaries, former IRA members, and corrupt politicians.

Despite the often grim subject matter, the series also has moments of humor and tenderness, as Chuckie and Jake's friendship provides a counterpoint to the violence and division around them.
