= Heno Magee =

- Born: 1939; Dublin, Ireland
- Died: 27 December 2016 (aged 77); Dublin, Ireland
- Occupation: Playwright
- Writing career
- Genre: Plays
- Notable work: Hatchet
- Notable awards: Rooney Prize for Irish Literature; 1976

Francis "Heno" Magee (1939 – 27 December 2016) was an Irish playwright best known for the play Hatchet. He was the recipient of the first Rooney Prize for Irish Literature, awarded in 1976. He died in Dublin on 27 December 2016 aged 77.
