= Southern Appalachian International Film Festival =

- Location: Erwin, Tennessee, U.S.
- Language: International
- Website: http://www.soapiff.com

Southern Appalachian International Film Festival (SOAPIFF) is a yearly film festival. The purpose of Southern Appalachian International Film Festival is to publicly recognize and promote the work of independent movie makers and to encourage film production and culture in Southern Appalachia.
