= Pegida (disambiguation) =

Pegida, full name Patriotic Europeans Against the Islamisation of the West (Occident) (German: Patriotische Europäer gegen die Islamisierung des Abendlandes), abbreviated PEGIDA or Pegida, is a German nationalist, anti-Islam, right-wing political movement.

Pegida may also refer to:

- Pegida Denmark
- Pegida Ireland
- Pegida Netherlands
- Pegida Switzerland
- Pegida UK
