= Edwin Wagensveld =

Dutch anti-Islam activist

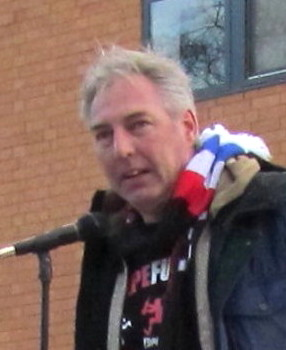
- Wagensveld in 2016
- Born: 1969 (age 56–57); Arnhem
- Citizenship: Netherlands
- Organization: Pegida

Edwin Wagensveld (born 1969, Arnhem) is a Dutch anti-Islam activist, convicted criminal and leader of Pegida Netherlands. He has managed to "create a spectacle generating broad media coverage" with his anti-Islam protests and Quran desecrations.

== Activities ==
Wagensveld has been the leader of Pegida Netherlands since November 2014, at a time when he owned a small internet-based business selling non-lethal weapons, self-defence articles and outdoors products. He had previously that year participated in a Hogesa demonstration. He lives in Germany close to the Dutch border, and commutes to the Netherlands to stage demonstrations, and is a staunch supporter of Geert Wilders. He headed the first Pegida Netherlands rally in October 2015, which was joined by Lutz Bachmann and Tommy Robinson. In 2016, he was revealed to have been patrolling for refugees on the border between Bulgaria and Turkey with Tatjana Festerling.

In April 2018, Wagensveld was sentenced to two years and nine months in prison for tax evasion.

He was investigated by Dutch police for tearing out pages of the Quran and calling it a "fascist book" in January 2023 in front of the Dutch parliament building. His desecrations of the Quran contributed to the diplomatic Quran crisis that year. In August, he trampled on and tore up a Quran outside the Turkish embassy in The Hague. During his subsequent trial in November, he tore apart another copy of the Quran. He was sentenced to forty hours of community service. In January 2024, he was violently attacked during a demonstration in Arnhem after he tried to burn a Quran. In March, he was arrested in Arnhem for pulling a Quran on a dog leash.

== See also ==
- Rasmus Paludan
- Salwan Momika
