= Siegbert Droese =

German politician

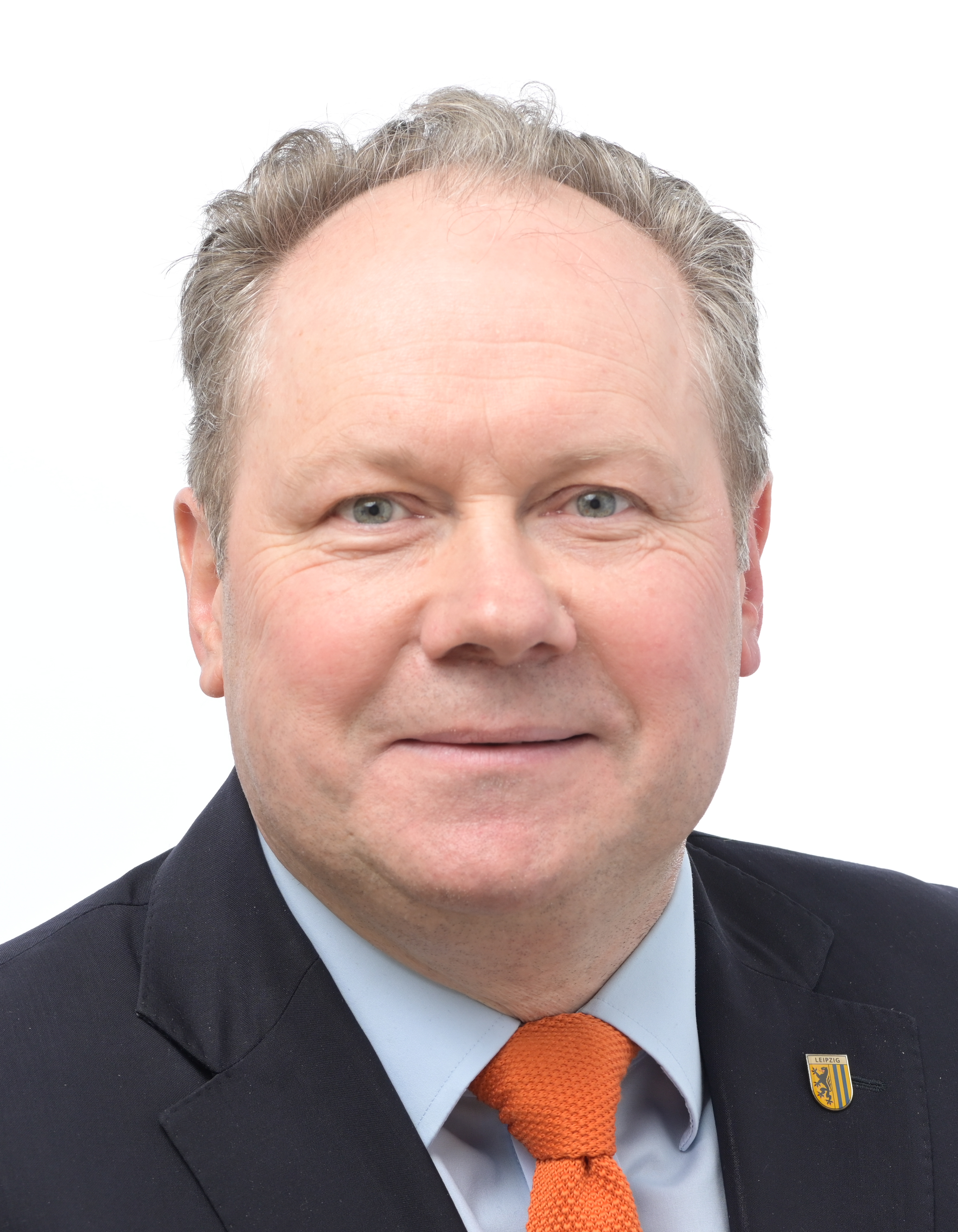

Member of the Bundestag
- Incumbent
- Assumed office 24 October 2017

Personal details
- Born: 7 June 1969 (age 57)
- Party: AfD

Siegbert Frank Droese (born 7 June 1969) is a German politician for the far right-wing Alternative for Germany (AfD) and since 2017 member of the Bundestag, the federal legislative body.

== Early life ==
Droese was born on 7 June 1969 in the city of Leipzig, then in East Germany (GDR). He was raised in a Christian family as the youngest of three siblings. Until he graduated from school, he participated in competitive athletics as a track and field athlete, specializing in the javelin throw.

== Career ==
From 1986 to 1988, he trained at Interhotel Leipzig as a restaurant specialist. In July 1989, he fled to West Germany via the open border with the Hungarian People's Republic. In Hamburg, he worked at the Hotel Atlantic Hamburg and trained as a hotel manager. He returned to Hotel Merkur in Leipzig in 1991, where he originally begun his training. Until 1994 he worked there as an assistant, then in the food service department until 1997. From 1998 to 2014 he was self-employed in the Leipzig hotel and restaurant industry. He opened a restaurant in the city centre, which he ran until November 2013. From 2015 to 2017, he was manager and member of the management board at F & B.

In 2013, Droese joined Alternative for Germany (AfD), and became the AfD Leipzig district association chairman in 2015. Droese was briefly a member of the völkisch-nationalist association Patriotische Plattform, but according to him, he left before the 2015 AfD federal party conference. He signed the "Erfurt Resolution," which, according to The Spectator, is considered the "founding document" of Der Flügel, an ultranationalist faction of AfD.

In 2016, Droese was nominated by the Leipzig AfD district council as a candidate for the Leipzig II constituency in the 2017 German federal election. Following the departure of Frauke Petry from AfD, he, as her deputy, became the acting chairman of AfD Saxony, but declined to run for the position at the 2018 AfD Saxony state party conference in Hoyerswerda. Before the 2019 state election, Droese stated his goal to make the AfD the strongest faction in the Landtag of Saxony and to provide the minister president of the state, though he said he would not run for the role himself.

== Political positions ==
As a Bundestag candidate in 2017, Droese said that he had not been interested in politics during the GDR-era or after his return to Leipzig. He considered the former bloc parties to be completely untrustworthy after 1989. He cited his Eurosceptic stance as the reason why he joined AfD. According to him, the euro had doubled many prices, EU bureaucracy had been increasingly restricting the German government, with the later zero interest-rate policy having effectively expropriated the savings of German pensioners.

In January 2017, far-right activist Tatjana Festerling appeared at a Legida rally, the Leipzig branch of the islamophobic and xenophobic protest movement Pegida from Dresden, and proposed an alliance with the AfD. Droese subsequently issued a press release advocating for cooperation between the AfD and Pegida, and for a long-scale joint demonstration in Leipzig. While the Patriotische Plattform was in support, a majority at the subsequent AfD Leipzig district party conference rejected direct official cooperation despite acknowledging "political common ground" between AfD and Pegida.

On 9 November 2022, when a decision was made to rename Turmgutstraße in Leipzig, the street where the Russian Consulate General is located, in honour of Ukrainian Holocaust survivor Borys Romanchenko, who was killed in a Russian airstrike during the Russo-Ukrainian war. Droese described the decision as "utter nonsense" that was "purely ideologically motivated, Russophobia is in fashion".

On 17 September 2026, Droese shouted 'USA! USA!' before a speech by Canadian Prime Minister Mark Carney at the European Parliament.

== Personal life ==
Droese is Evangelical Lutheran. He is married and has four children.
