= The Wolves Are Back? =

Sculpture exhibition

The Wolves Are Back? (Die Wölfe sind zurück?) is a sculpture exhibition created by German artist Rainer Opolka. The exhibition was created as a response to the growing presence of Pegida in the German city of Dresden. The exhibition was installed in front of the Dresden Frauenkirche in Neumarkt square on March 16, 2016, where it remained until March 23, 2016. The exhibition featured 66 metal wolf sculptures placed around the square. The wolves were anthropomorphic in nature, appearing more human towards the center of the exhibition. The wolf statues were arranged around a central figure, a golden wolf giving the Nazi salute. This figure is thought to represent Pegida's leader at the time, Lutz Bachmann.

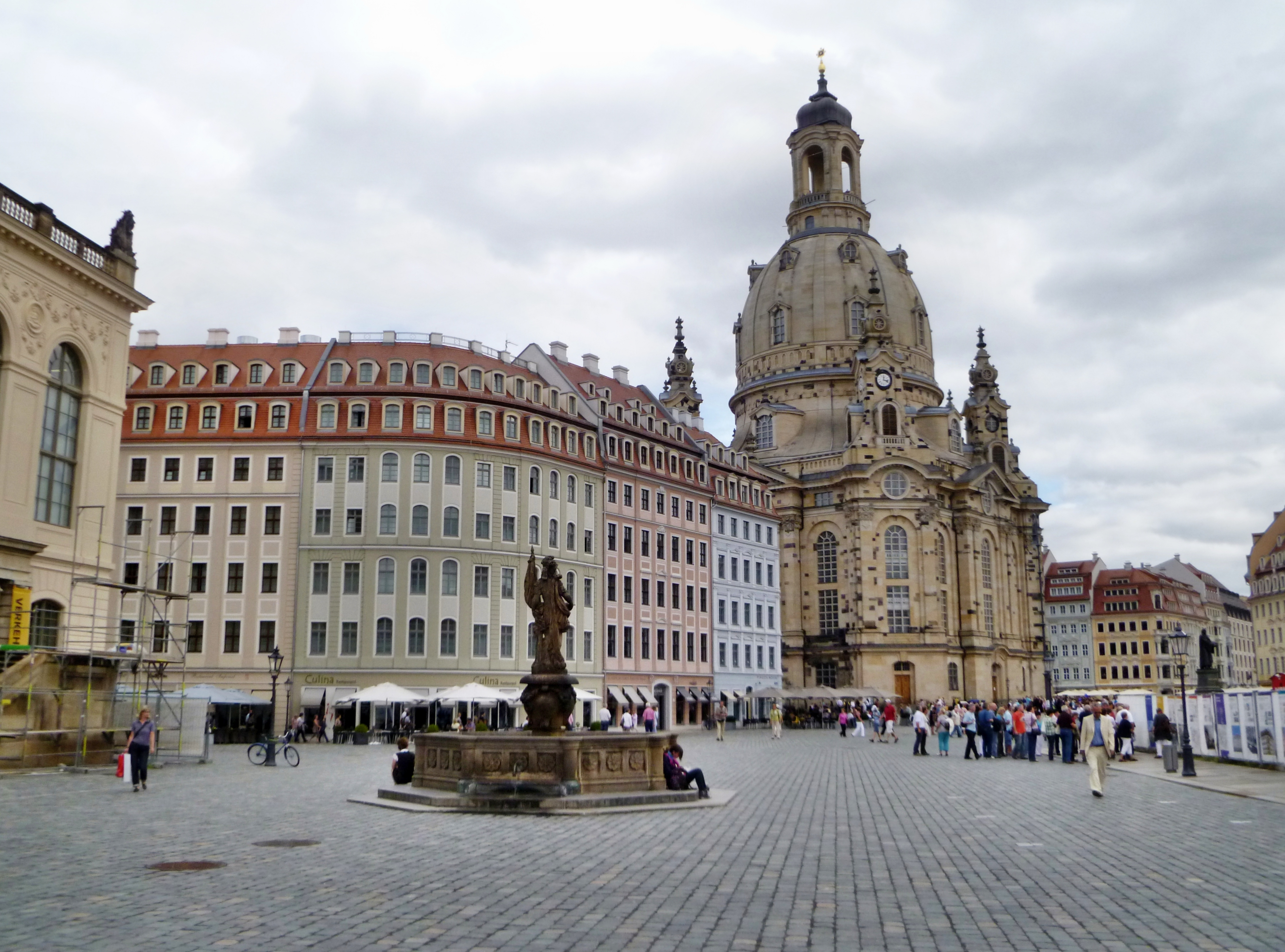
Dresden Neumarkt 172

== Artist ==
Before he became an artist, Rainer Opolka was an entrepreneur. The brothers created the German light company Ledlenser, and developed the Ledlenser V8 flashlight. Rainer and Harold sold over 200 million Euros' worth of LED flashlights in the first five years of their business. Their Ledlenser V8 flashlight became one of the top-selling LED flashlights in the world. The brothers sold three quarters of the shares in their company “to devote themselves exclusively to making art. The brothers have also set up a sculpture and cultural center in Schloss Hubertushöhe in Storkow, and have already invested €25 million into the project.” Although Rainer and Harold collaboratively created the sculpture and cultural centre in Schloss Hubertushöhe, “The Wolves Are Back?” is Rainer's independent project.

== Description ==
Among the sculptures, there are eight different wolf designs. Each type of sculpture is designed to represent a different group of people contributing to racism in Germany. There are two variations of blindfolded wolves, called blind soldiers and blind haters, representing mob mentality. Another is a gun wielding wolf, representing “the xenophobic murders committed by the neo-Nazi group National Socialist Underground [NSU] during the early 2000s.” The NSU were responsible for the racially motivated NSU murders, which claimed the lives of eight Turkish immigrants, one Greek person and one German police officer. The attack wolf stands on two legs, lunging forward. There are two sets of statues described as followers, these figures are on all fours. There is the muscleman wolf, and finally one leader wolf.

== Context ==
=== Dresden Installation ===
The exhibit was created in the early spring of 2016 as a response to political climate in Dresden at the time. The exhibition was installed right after the Refugee Crisis of 2015, when Germany temporarily opened its borders and accepted over one million refugees. The result was a rise in crimes against minorities, asylum seekers and asylum accommodation. Opolka was inspired to create his wolf sculptures after the Federal Criminal Police Office registered “1,031 “crimes against asylum accommodation” across Germany in 2015 – from offensive graffiti to 94 acts of arson.” When asked why he chose to use wolves to symbolize social and political tension in Germany, Opolka stated that “since Thomas Hobbes the wolf has been a symbol for the inner social conflicts of men [...] I remain in that tradition. I want to show those conflicts and use the wolf as metaphor.” The exhibition ran in Dresden until March 23, 2016.

=== Travelling Installation ===
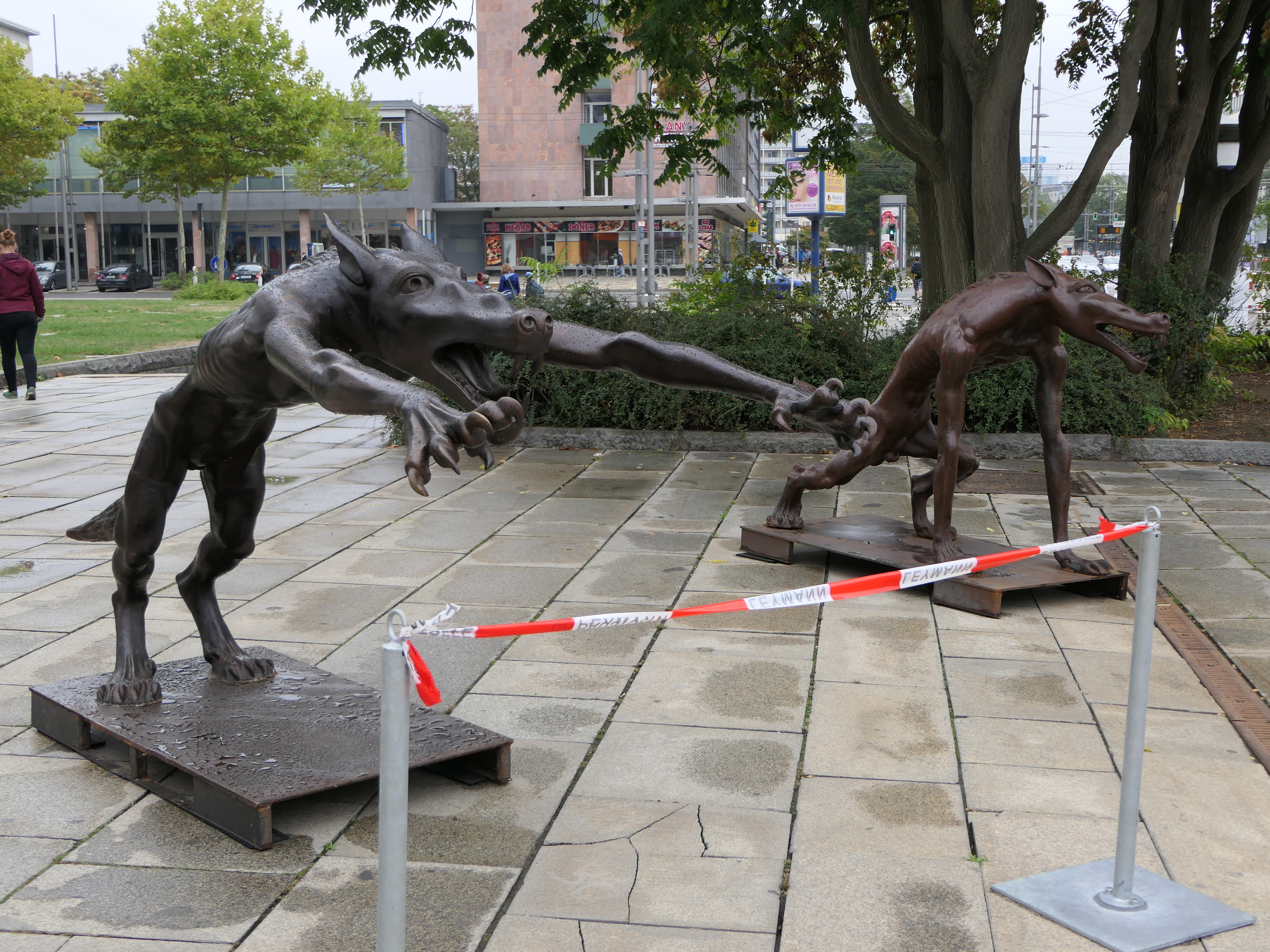
Wölfe-Kunstaktion gegen Hetze und Gewalt in Chemnitz 2018 (06)

Afterwards, “The Wolves Are Back?” became a travelling exhibition in several German cities. It stayed in Potsdam's Alter Markt (new parliament) from April 14 to May 1, 2016; Berlin's Washingonplatz (central station) from August 5 to August 16, 2016; Rathenow's Märkischer Platz from September 15 to September 17, 2016; Berlin's Brandenburg Gate from January 9 to February 20, 2017; Oranienburg's Schlossplatz from June 1 to June 5, 2017.

A statement on the homepage of “The Wolves Are Back?” website says that Opolka and his team are currently “planning to visit all the German states as a touring exhibition.” They “are currently filing applications for Hamburg, Bremen, Düsseldorf and Cologne.”

== Reception ==
“The Wolves Are Back?” is considered a success by the artist. It engaged the public in discussions about racism. According to “The Wolves Are Back?” website, “80,000 visitors came, the wolves were photographed around 200,000 times, our team held thousands of discussions, and more importantly, we provoked tens of thousands of discussions.” The success of the installation in Dresden is the reason it was approved to show in other cities.
