= Direct democracy (disambiguation) =

Direct democracy or pure democracy is a form of democracy in which people decide on policy initiatives directly

Direct democracy may also refer to:

== Political parties ==
- Alliance for Direct Democracy in Europe, a European political party
- Direct Democracy Ireland, a political party in Ireland
- Direct Democracy (Polish political party), a Polish political party that existed between 2012–2022
- Direct Democracy (Polish parliamentary group), named Free Republicans until 2026, a parliamentary group in the Polish Sejm
- Direct Democracy League, American political movement by John Randolph Haynes
- Direct Democracy Now!, also known as True Democracy Now!, a Greek citizen grassroot organization made up of ordinary citizens
- Direct Democracy for Europe, a German campaign group led by the former Pegida treasurer Kathrin Oertel
- Europe of Freedom and Direct Democracy, a former Eurosceptic political group in the European Parliament
- Freedom and Direct Democracy, a far-right political party in the Czech Republic
- Online Direct Democracy, formerly Senator Online, a former Australian political party
- None of the Above Direct Democracy Party, a political party in Ontario, Canada
- Direct Democracy Cyprus, a political party in Cyprus
