= Murder of Keira Gross =

2018 murder in Berlin, Germany

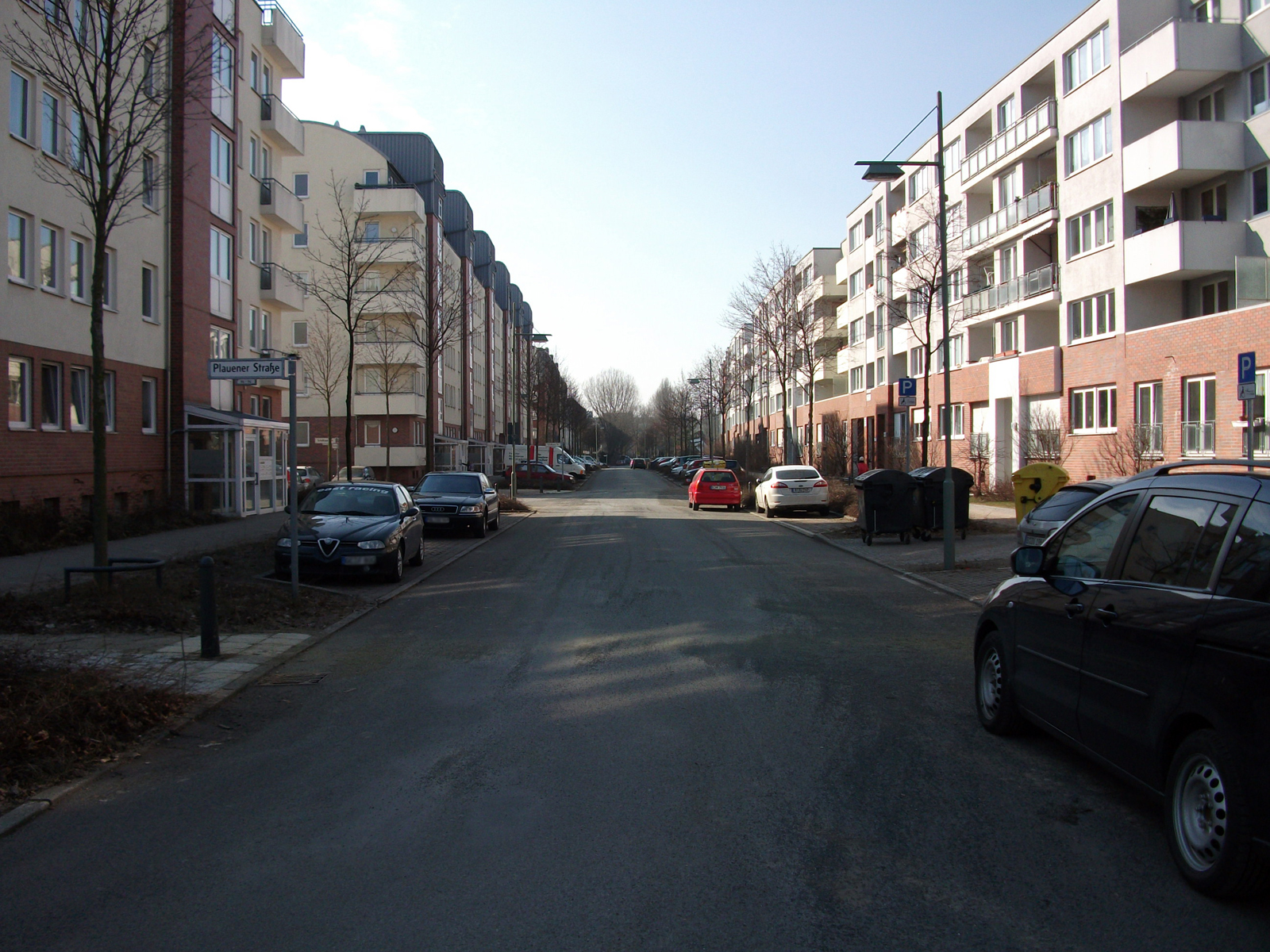
- The murder took place in the apartment block on the near right

- Murder of Keira Gross (Berlin) Plauener Straße in Berlin
- Native name: Mordfall Keira G.
- Date: 7 March 2018
- Location: Plauener Straße, Alt-Hohenschönhausen, Berlin, Germany; 52°32′20.8″N 13°30′33.7″E
- Cause: Stabbing
- Deaths: Keira Gross (aged 14 years)
- Convicted: 1. Edgar H. aka "Hannes E."
- Convictions: 1. Murder
- Sentence: 1. 9 years imprisonment

Keira Gross (24 September 2003 – 7 March 2018) was a 14-year-old German girl who was stabbed to death at her home in Berlin on 7 March 2018. In November 2018 15-year-old Edgar H. (also known by the pseudonym "Hannes E.") was found guilty of Keira's murder and sentenced to nine years in youth detention. The murder attracted the attention of the far-right who spread false information blaming immigrants for the killing.

== Background ==
Keira Gross was born on 24 September 2003 in Berlin. The 14-year-old lived with her mother Karin Gross in an apartment on Plauener Straße in the east Berlin suburb of Alt-Hohenschönhausen. Karin was a single mother and Keira was her only child. Keira was an 8th grade student at the Grüner Campus Malchow. She was a keen ice skater and regularly trained at the nearby Berliner TSC indoor sports stadium. In January 2018 she became Berlin champion in her age group for speed skating over 1,500 metres.

In 2016 and 2017 there were two high-profile murders of German girls by immigrants. In October 2016 19-year-old medical student Maria Ladenburger was raped and murdered in Freiburg by Afghan Hussein Khavari. In December 2017 15-year old Mia Valentin was murdered in Kandel by her ex-boyfriend Abdul Dawodzai, an Afghan immigrant.

== Murder ==
On 7 March 2018 Karin Gross received a phone message from Keira saying that she was home and asking her mother to call her when she was coming home. As Karin left work she tried to contact Keira several times but received no response. At around 5.30pm Karin arrived back at their apartment on Plauener Straße and found Keira sitting in-front of the couch, gagged by a bloodied scarf. Karin contacted emergency services who talked her through resuscitating Keira. Medics arrived in nine minutes and spent 90 minutes trying to save Keira's life before she died in-front her mother. She had been stabbed 23 times - the first to the neck and the rest to the upper body and back. Three of the stabs - to the neck, heart and lung - would have been fatal.

== Investigation ==
Keira's autopsy confirmed that she had been a victim of homicide. On the evening of the murder neighbours had heard arguing and door slamming from Keira's apartment. Analysis of Keira's phone messages led the police to identify a suspect. On 11 March 2018 15-year-old Edgar H. was arrested on a charge of manslaughter. He was white, born in Germany and a church goer. He was given the legal pseudonym "Hannes E." due to his age. He was in the 9th grade at the same school as Keira and was known to her. Keira was said to be infatuated with "Hannes" and had a photo of him in her room but, according to her mother, they weren't in a relationship and Keira spoke about "Hannes" like a brother.

After being arrested "Hannes" confessed to stabbing Keira and claimed that she had wanted to die. This was rejected by the police, prosecutors, her family, friends and others who knew her. DNA found at the murder scene matched "Hannes"'. According to prosecutors, the murder was premeditated. In the days preceding the murder "Hannes" had informed his school friends in detail how he intended to carry out the murder. He had told them that he wanted to stab someone in the neck, that he wanted to taste human flesh and set buildings on fire but they did not take him seriously. He had been planning to murder Keira since at least 1 March 2018 and had chosen her as his victim because she would trust him due to her feelings for him. Some time before the murder he had dyed his hair green, painted his face white to look the Joker and wore Joker playing cards around his neck.

On the day of the murder Keira and "Hannes" had exchanged WhatsApp messages and arranged to meet at her home to do homework together. "Hannes" went to Keira's home with a backpack containing an 11 cm kitchen knife, a change of clothes, rubber gloves, mask, plastic hair covers and shoes. After the murder he took Keira's mobile phone and threw it into a lake to hide their WhatsApp exchanges. Minutes after the murder he called one of his friends to confirm that he had carried out the murder. He then returned home to Weißensee, placed the knife back in his parents' kitchen and put the backpack in his room before playing League of Legends.

== Murder trial ==
The trial of "Hannes" began on 25 September 2018 at the 13th Criminal Division of the Berlin Regional Court behind closed doors due to the defendant's age. Karin Gross was a co-plaintiff in the case. "Hannes" had refused to be interviewed by forensic psychiatrists after being arrested so they had to observe his behaviour in court and determined that he was fully responsible for his actions. According to psychiatrists "Hannes" showed no signs of having a personality disorder or a mental illness. On the eighth day of the trial "Hannes" gave a statement to the court in which he again claimed that Keira had asked to be killed.

Prosecutors requested a sentence of nine years and ten months but defence lawyers had wanted a much shorter prison sentence for what they claimed was a "minor case of manslaughter at best". On 22 November 2018 "Hannes" was found guilty of murder and sentenced to nine years in a youth detention center. This was one year less than the maximum sentence as "Hannes" has no prior criminal convictions and had made a partial confession. According to the verdict, he acted "out of pure murderous intent" (German: aus reiner Mordlust) and "wanted to see if he could handle committing a murder". He had been preoccupied with killing a person for a long time and "only cared about killing a person". According to the verdict, the claim by "Hannes" that Keira had wanted to be killed was "purely invented". Karin Gross described the sentence as inadequate but said she had neither hatred nor anger towards "Hannes".

"Hannes" appealed the verdict to the Federal Court of Justice but on 13 August 2019 the court rejected the appeal and confirmed the Berlin Regional Court's verdict. On 18 November 2020 the Federal Constitutional Court refused to hear "Hannes"' constitutional appeal. "Hannes", whose parents believe he is innocent, subsequently appealed to the European Court of Human Rights (ECHR) on the grounds that his conviction was based on a confessions he made during his interrogation when he had not been advised of his right to consult his parents and that he had not had the opportunity to talk confidentially with his mother. As of July 2024 the case was pending at the ECHR.

== Aiding and abetting trial ==
Many of "Hannes"' friends knew about his murder plans but most were able to convince the authorities that they had not taken the plans seriously. In February 2020 prosecutors charged a friend of "Hannes" with aiding and abetting manslaughter. According to prosecutors, "Klara J.", who was 14-yeard-old at the time of Keira's murder, had chatted with "Hannes" prior to the murder and agreed to give him a false alibi by claiming that they were together at a shopping mall at the time of the murder.

The trial of "Klara" began on 13 April 2021 at the Berlin Regional Court behind closed doors. As of 7 May 2021 no verdict had been given on the case.

== Far-right misinformation ==
The day after the murder Berlin Police issued a press release about the killing but provided very few details for fear of jeopardising the criminal investigation. Soon after this the far-right started spreading misinformation about the murder and exploiting it to further their political cause, posting messages on Twitter and Facebook with hashtag #Keira blaming immigrants for the murder. Even though the perpetrator had not been identified they assumed that, since Keira had been stabbed to death, a non-German had done it because "no German could ever do such a thing". A link was also made to the murders of Maria Ladenburger and Mia Valentin. On 8 March 2018 the far-right Halle Leaks website claimed without any evidence that the perpetrator was a refugee and described the murder as "Kandel 2.0", a reference to the murder of Mia Valentin in Kandel. The far-right PI News blog claimed on 9 March 2018 that Keira was the victim of "adolescent migrants" admitted early to accelerate population replacement, a core far-right conspiracy theory. The far-right journalist David Berger published a post on his Philosophia perennis blog blaming the opening of the borders to refugees for a "knife epidemic" and that young people were being "slaughtered in a bestial manner. On 12 March 2018 the far-right Alternative for Germany (AfD) posted a graphic on Facebook with the title "KNIFE EPIDEMIC RAMPANT" which listed 11 crimes involving knives, including Keira's murder, and blaming them on Turks, Kurds, Chechens, Afghans, Eritreans, Gambians and Syrians. In fact, only five of the crimes were committed by foreigners but nevertheless the post was shared almost 3,000 times.

On 11 March 2018 Berlin Police announced that they had arrested a suspect but again provided very few details. In accordance with German Press Council guidelines, they didn't disclose the suspect's ethnic or religious background. This is resulted in further rumours on social media about the perpetrator, such as that he was an asylum seeker from Afghanistan. The far-right Compact magazine claimed that the rumours were justified due to the police's refusal to give further information. After the arrest Gunnar Lindemann, an AfD member of the Abgeordnetenhaus of Berlin, tweeted asking why the police weren't providing further details such as the origin of the perpetrator. Similar sentiments were posted by lawyer and AfD member Maximilian Krah. Lindemann was supported by Julian Reichelt, editor-in-chief of the right-wing Bild newspaper.

One of the main propagators of the misinformation was Lutz Bachmann, convicted criminal and founder of the far-right anti-Islamic Pegida group. On 12 March 2018 Bachmann posted a message online, falsely claiming he knew the identity of the murderer whom he labelled a "beast from the Caucasus", a "Chechen Muslim" and a "former refugee". Bachmann even posted a picture of a boy, his name and Facebook profile. The boy had no connection to the murder and, in an unusual move, Berlin Police were compelled to respond to Bachmann's post which they described as fake news. A police spokesperson told the media that they had "never experienced a murder case being politically exploited in such a way". Bachmann deleted the post but the police subsequently launched an investigation against Bachmann and others for slander, false accusation and incitement. The boy who had been deliberately and falsely doxed by Bachmann deleted his Facebook account but months after the incident his personal information including his full name and photograph were still online.

Even after the murderer's identity had been revealed the far-right wouldn't accept that the murder was committed by a German. Keira's gravestone was vandalised with graffiti describing her killer as "Russian".
