= Pegida Switzerland =

Swiss branch of a German anti-Islam movement

- Pegida Schweiz; Pegida Suisse; Pegida Svizzera; Pegida Svizra; Pegida Helvetia
- Formation: 9 January 2015
- Type: Anti-Islam
- Headquarters: Dresden, Germany
- Location: Switzerland
- Leader: Mike Spielmann; Tobias Steiger
- Website: Official Facebook page

Pegida Switzerland is the Swiss branch of the German anti-Islam movement Pegida. It was launched on 9 January 2015, two days after the Charlie Hebdo attacks.

== History ==
In January 2015, the spokesperson Ignaz Bearth was accused by the media of having bought likes for his Facebook Page. The reason: Reporter Sebastian Sele from Vice magazine claimed that when he used Stern magazine's Facebook like check tool to see what it would show about Ignaz Bearth's Facebook Page, it showed that 43% of Ignaz Bearth's Facebook Page's likes were from India. According to Marco Lüssi from 20 Minuten, Lutz Bachmann wrote in a Facebook post on 5 March 2016 that Ignaz Bearth "had agreed to leave Pegida months ago and is in no way a representative of our burgher movement." This means that Bearth is no longer welcome as a speaker at any Pegida rallies anywhere in the world. Ignaz Bearth agreed, for "the good of the movement," to step down from his role as spokesperson for Pegida Switzerland.

Mike Spielmann and Tobias Steiger then took over the role of doing official communication with Dresden for Pegida Switzerland. Spielmann and Steiger have plans to make Pegida Switzerland a full-fledged political party "in consultation with [Pegida leadership in] Dresden."
