= Murder of Khaled Idris Bahray =

Eritrean refugee and murder victim

Khaled Idris Bahray
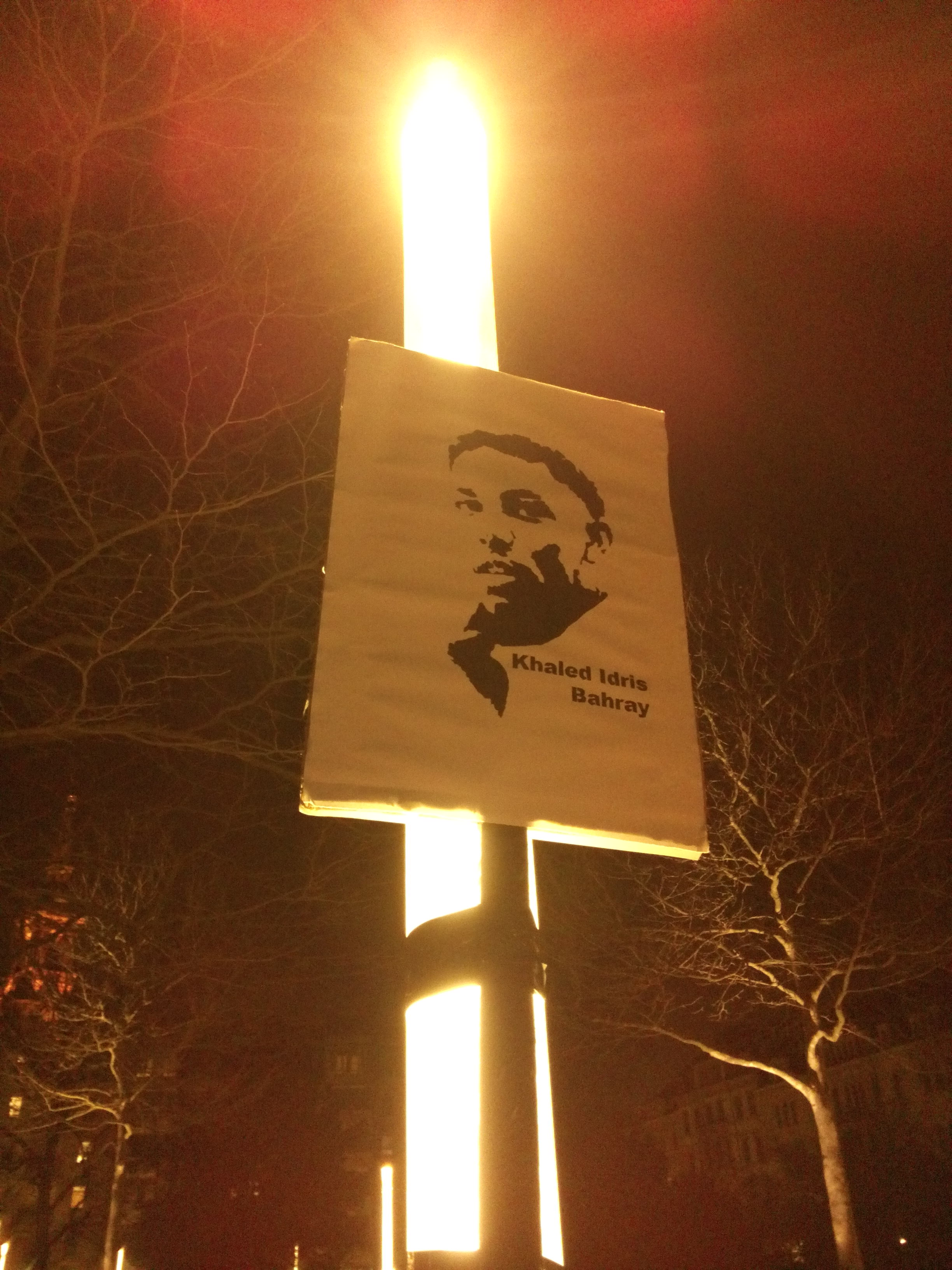
- Vigil in Dresden for Khaled Idris Bahray
- Born: 1994; Keren, Eritrea
- Died: 12 January 2015 (aged 20–21); Dresden, Saxony, Germany
- Cause of death: Stabbing

Khaled Idris Bahray was an Eritrean refugee and asylum seeker who was stabbed to death on 12 January 2015, in Dresden, Saxony, Germany. Although it was widely speculated and claimed in the media and on social media that the murder had racist motives, some days later an Eritrean roommate of Bahray confessed to the murder.

== Life ==
Khaled Idris Bahray was born in Keren, and was a Muslim. At the age of five, he fled with his mother and sister to Wadi Halfa in Sudan. As a refugee, he was able to receive neither an education nor employment. In 2014 he decided to flee with a cousin to Europe. They made their way over land to Libya and over the Mediterranean Sea via refugee boat. He arrived in Sicily, but his cousin perished on the boat journey. In August 2014 he arrived in a refugee camp in Munich, from where he was brought to Chemnitz, then housed in Schneeberg and finally in Dresden. In September 2014, he was assigned to a Dresden apartment with other refugees, in the district of Leubnitz-Neuostra. His friends and flatmates described him as a peace-loving and kindly man.

== Events ==
On the night of 12 January 2015, Bahray left his apartment around 8 pm to buy cigarettes in a supermarket 100 meters from his apartment. He did not return. The next morning at 7:40 am, his body was found, covered with blood, in the courtyard of his apartment complex. Police did not initially realize the extent of his injuries and reported “no indications of foul play” – though the death certificate registered a suspicion of unnatural death. The autopsy – still the morning of 13 January – revealed that Bahray had died due to multiple knife wounds in the neck and upper body. On 14 January, Bahray’s seven flatmates, together with 16 others who had gathered at the flat when his body was found, were questioned by police and gave DNA samples.

The murder investigation officially commenced on 15 January. Evidence was gathered in the victim's home and witnesses were interviewed. On 22 January, the prosecuting office stated that a 26-year-old Eritrean roommate of Bahray's had confessed to the stabbing and had been taken into arrest. The murder trial began on 31 August and ended on 6 November, leading to a conviction of manslaughter and five-year prison sentence.

== Criticism of the police ==
As the investigation was delayed for so long after finding the body, a member of the Bundestag Volker Beck (Alliance '90/The Greens) filed criminal charges of obstruction of justice. The Dresden police chief was questioned by the Saxon Committee on Internal Affairs.

The conduct of the police work was referred to as a scandal by the media.

== Public reactions ==
=== To immigration ===
- Three days prior to the murder of Bahray, two swastikas were smeared on his apartment door, accompanied by the words “We’ll get you all”. The eight refugees' official social worker had reported this, as well as someone kicking at the door, and filed charges.
- The murder coincided with the weekly Pegida demonstrations that were taking place every Monday night.
- After a fellow Eritrean was implicated in the killing, Deutschlandfunk Kultur began an eight-part series over the course of four weeks, covering the life and death of Khaled Idris Bahray and the politicization of his killing as well as the legal process that followed, including the effects of trauma from torture in Eritrea and the journey to Germany as a refugee may have had on all those involved.

=== To the crime ===
- There was speculation on social media about racist motives for the murder.

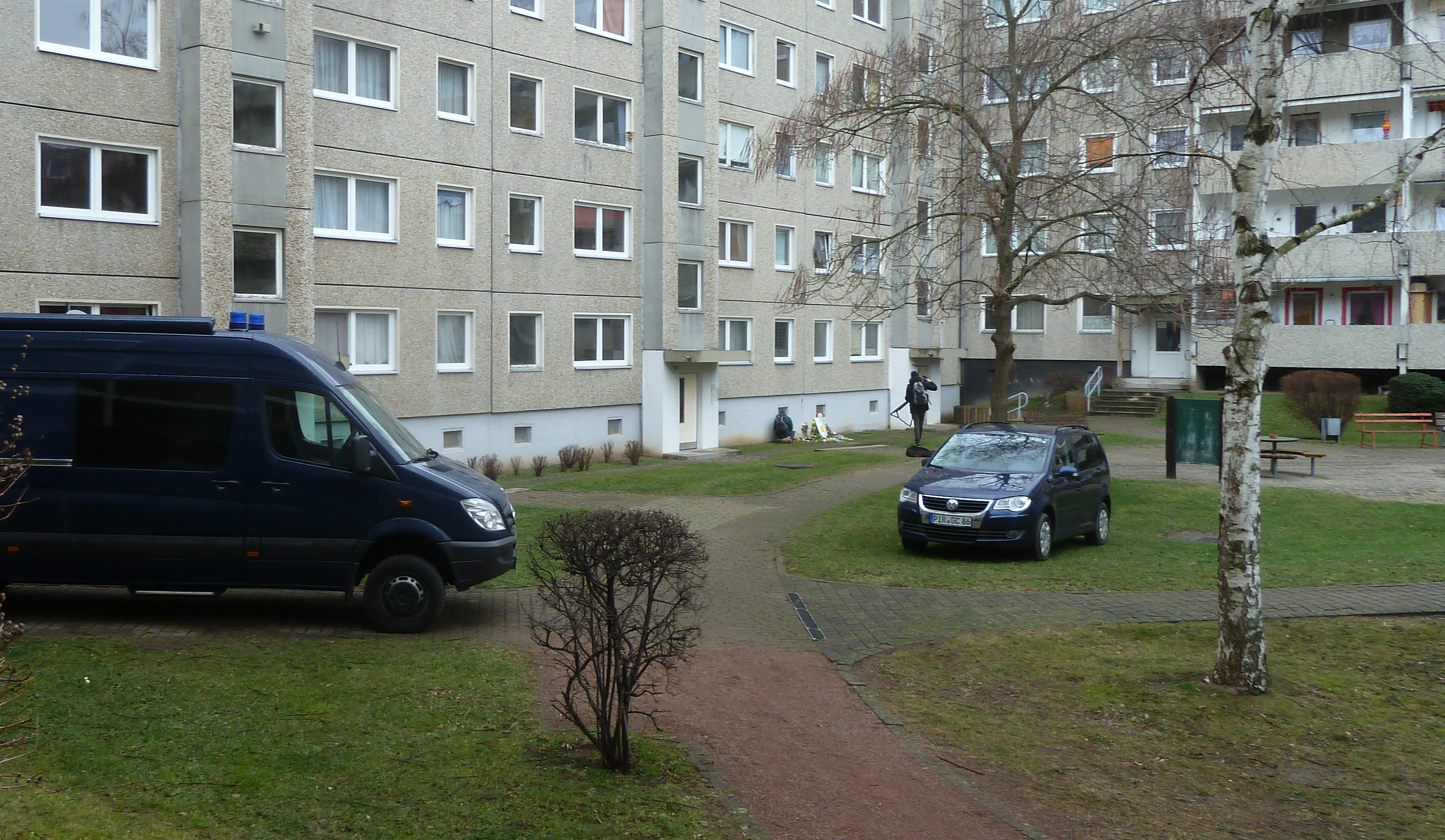
Commemoration of Kahled Idris Bahray in Dresden near his house and enhanced presence of police

- On the afternoon of 14 January, a candlelight vigil was held at Dresden Jorge Gomondai Square with 200 asylum seekers and supporters. Vigil participants spontaneously demonstrated in a march to the Dresden Albertinum to speak with Saxon president Stanislaw Tillich about their fears. Tillich did not appear, but the minister of integration did briefly.
- The Eritrean Refugees of Dresden report no longer feeling safe in Dresden after the murder and want to move to a safer part of Germany.
- Elizabeth Chyrum, the Director of Human Rights Concern-Eritrea, sent an open letter to the German Federal Minister of Justice and Consumer Protection: "... It seems extraordinary that, according to news reports, the German police initially claimed they did not suspect foul play even though the body was covered in blood and wounds and this happened in the wake of the anti-immigrant and anti-Muslim demonstrations in Dresden, and given the persistent threats refugees in the area have been experiencing, there seems to be little doubt that Mr. Bahray is a victim of these extremists..."
