= Direct Democracy for Europe =

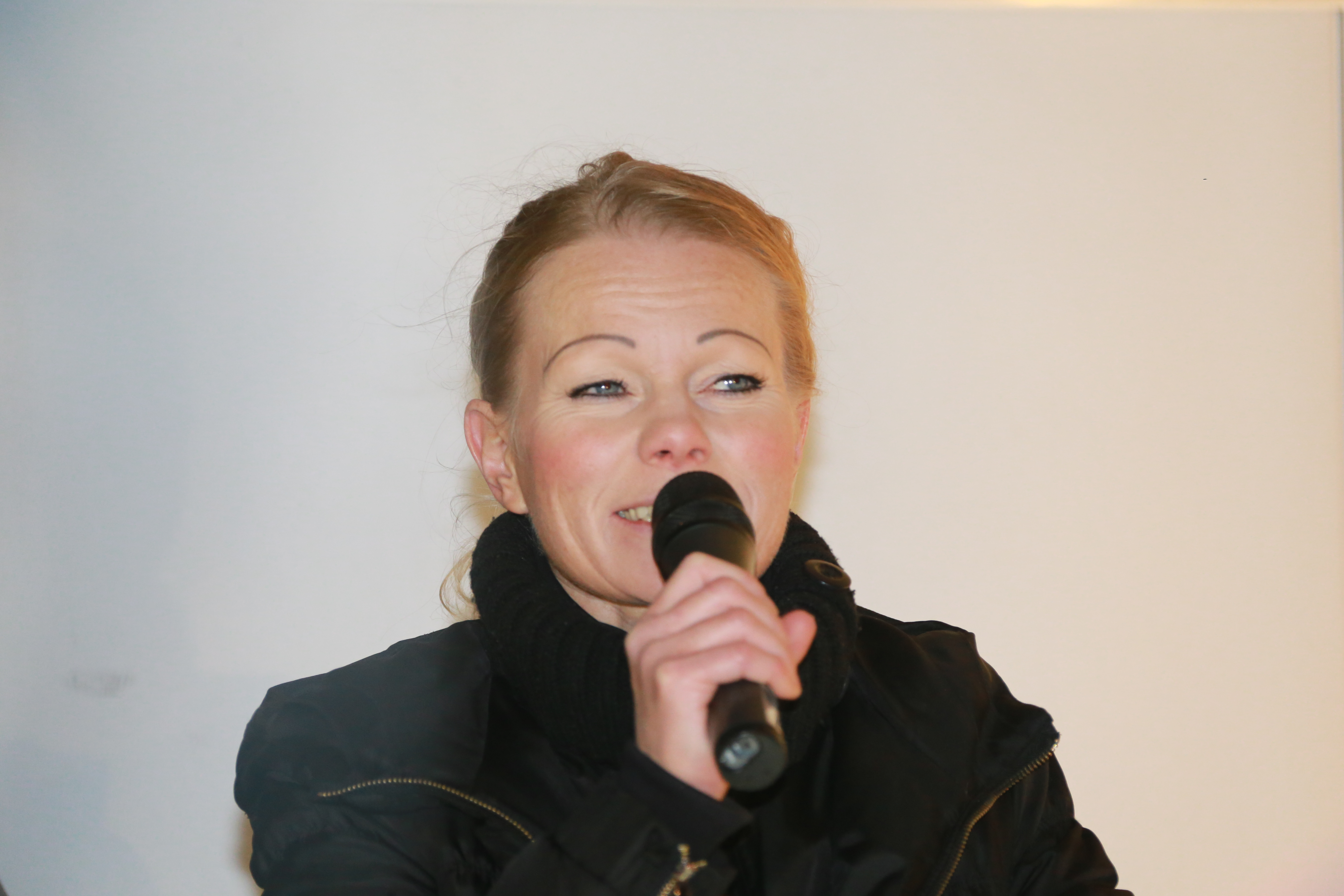
Kathrin Oertel

Direct Democracy for Europe (German: Direkte Demokratie für Europa, DDfE) is a campaign group formed by six former organizers of the German anti-Islam Pegida protests, led by the former Pegida treasurer, Kathrin Oertel. DDfE split from Pegida after Pegida's founder, Lutz Bachmann—who had resigned as chairman in late January 2015 after allegations of hate speech and revelations that he had posed as Adolf Hitler for selfies—refused to leave Pegida's 12-person organizing team. Oertel, a freelance business consultant from Coswig, Saxony, near Dresden, was previously the second most prominent spokesperson of Pegida.

== Objectives ==
In contrast to Pegida, which DDfE calls a "protest movement", DDfE claims to take a more moderate position. It calls itself a "reform movement" and places itself "to the right of the Christian Democratic Union of Germany", the centre-right party of Chancellor Angela Merkel,. The activists of DDfE focus on demands for more direct democracy and tend to avoid overt anti-Muslim statements. Oertel was quoted in The Guardian as saying, "We had a real fear that the discontent in Germany could end in civil war, and we wanted to avoid that."

According to the publications of Initiative and Referendum Institute Europe, DDfE's program is made up of campaigning for nationwide referendums and European citizens' initiatives, underlining an intensified commitment towards direct popular participation in democracy. This aligns with broader trends in modern direct democracy, which unite elements of direct and representative democratic systems. Such systems allow citizens to vote directly on particular policies while still electing representatives for day-to-day governance.

Nonetheless, Oertel stated that she still considered Pegida necessary. According to her, DDfE shares Pegida's goals but adopts different means.

On 6 February 2015, DDfE posted a "position paper" on its Facebook page containing its main demands:

- nationwide direct democracy (referendums); European "citizens' initiatives"
- freedom of speech and freedom of information, which must not be "personally detrimental"
- improved homeland security-type measures not dependent on the state of government finances; more staff and improved equipment for police, firefighters, and emergency medical services. Volunteering is proclaimed a "mainstay of the aforementioned areas", resulting in an implicit call for vigilante groups.
- a "qualitative and modern immigration law" and a "reform" of German asylum laws
- pension reform and a change in family policies so that "nobody has to choose between having children or having a job" and old-age poverty is avoided
- a stop to "warmongering" and economic sanctions against Russia as a result of the Russo-Ukrainian War; no weapons deliveries to Ukraine
- a "fair global economy"; rejection of the Transatlantic Trade and Investment Partnership.

== Public protest ==
DDfE organized its first public rally at Dresden's Neumarkt on 8 February 2015. The organizers expected up to 5,000 participants, but according to official police estimates, only 500 turned up. According to the organizers, the number of participants was 1,000. This was generally described as disappointing, after Pegida had attracted up to 25,000 protesters in January 2015.

The group drew scorn from the German press for posing in front of a map of Europe that depicted Germany without its northernmost federal state, Schleswig-Holstein (which was attached to Denmark instead), and that featured non-European Union members Ukraine and Belarus while excluding EU member Greece and EU candidates Montenegro and Albania.
