= Pegida Netherlands =

Dutch far-right anti-Islamic political movement

- Pegida Nederland
- Formation: 11 October 2015
- Type: Anti-Islam
- Location: Netherlands
- Leader: Edwin Wagensveld
- Affiliations: Fortress Europe

Pegida Netherlands is the Dutch branch of the German anti-Islamic political movement Pegida. The organisation is led by Edwin Wagensveld.

== History and activities ==
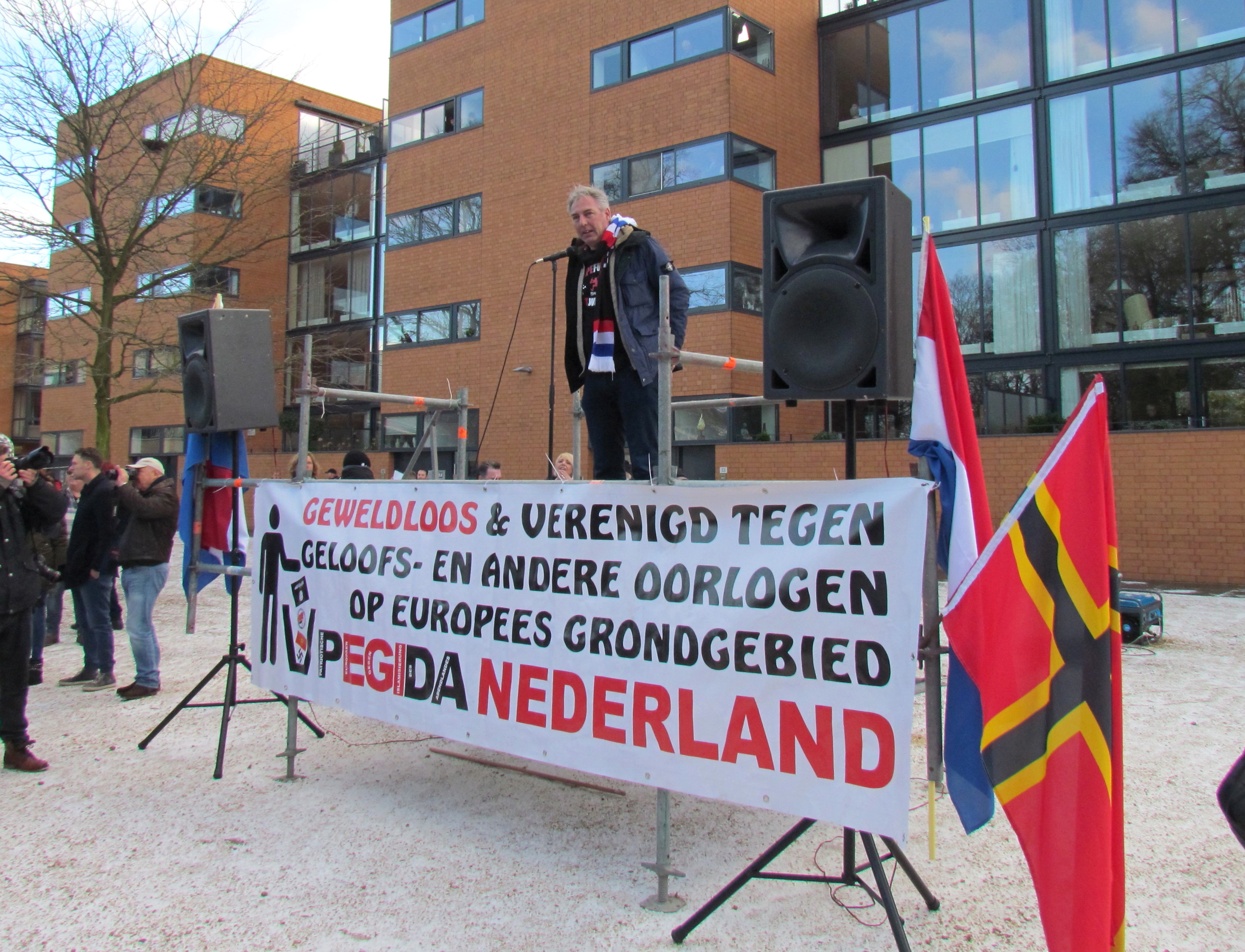
Pegida Netherlands leader Edwin Wagensveld speaks during a demonstration in Apeldoorn.

It had its inaugural rally on 11 October 2015 in Utrecht. Those in attendance included Lutz Bachmann, Siegfried Däbritz, and Tommy Robinson.

Pegida Netherlands is a signatory to the "Prague Declaration" as part of the international Fortress Europe coalition in January 2016. On 20 February 2016 Edwin Wagensveld, leader of Pegida Netherlands, was arrested for provocative behavior during a demonstration in Ede. He was in police custody for an hour. He was arrested for the second time that month on 27 February 2016 at Amsterdam city hall. He was using the Pegida logo, which shows a swastika being thrown into a trash can. The city said, "The use of swastikas will not be tolerated, even if they are included in a protest sign or other form of expression where the National Socialist ideology is rejected, or in any other manner of speech whatsoever".

In 2023, Wagensweld was prosecuted for tearing apart a Quran during a protest, calling it a "fascist book".
