= Weisse Wölfe Terrorcrew =

German neo-Nazi group

- Abbreviation: WWT
- Dissolved: 2016
- Type: Neo-Nazi group
- Location: Germany

The Weisse Wölfe Terrorcrew (transl. White Wolves Terror Crew) were a German neo-Nazi group originally founded as a fan group for the German band Weisse Wölfe. The police had investigated them for several years. In October 2015, German police foiled a plot by the group to attack a refugee centre with explosives, knives, a baseball bat and a gun. The group, headquartered in Bamberg, were also found to be in possession of swastika flags (which are illegal in Germany), Nazi magazines, and Third Reich memorabilia. The group were reportedly planning to attack the refugee center on Halloween.

The members of WWT, which consisted of 11 men and two women, had been monitored by police for over a year. Some were also members of the neo-Nazi party Die Rechte, while others belonged to Nügida, a local offshoot of PEGIDA. According to police, some of them had been "participants and managers" in anti-immigrant and anti-refugee demonstrations. Four of the participants were arrested and held in pre-trial detention after being charged in 2016. The Weisse Wölfe Terrorcrew was banned by the German Ministry of the Interior in 2016.
