= Tatjana Festerling =

German activist

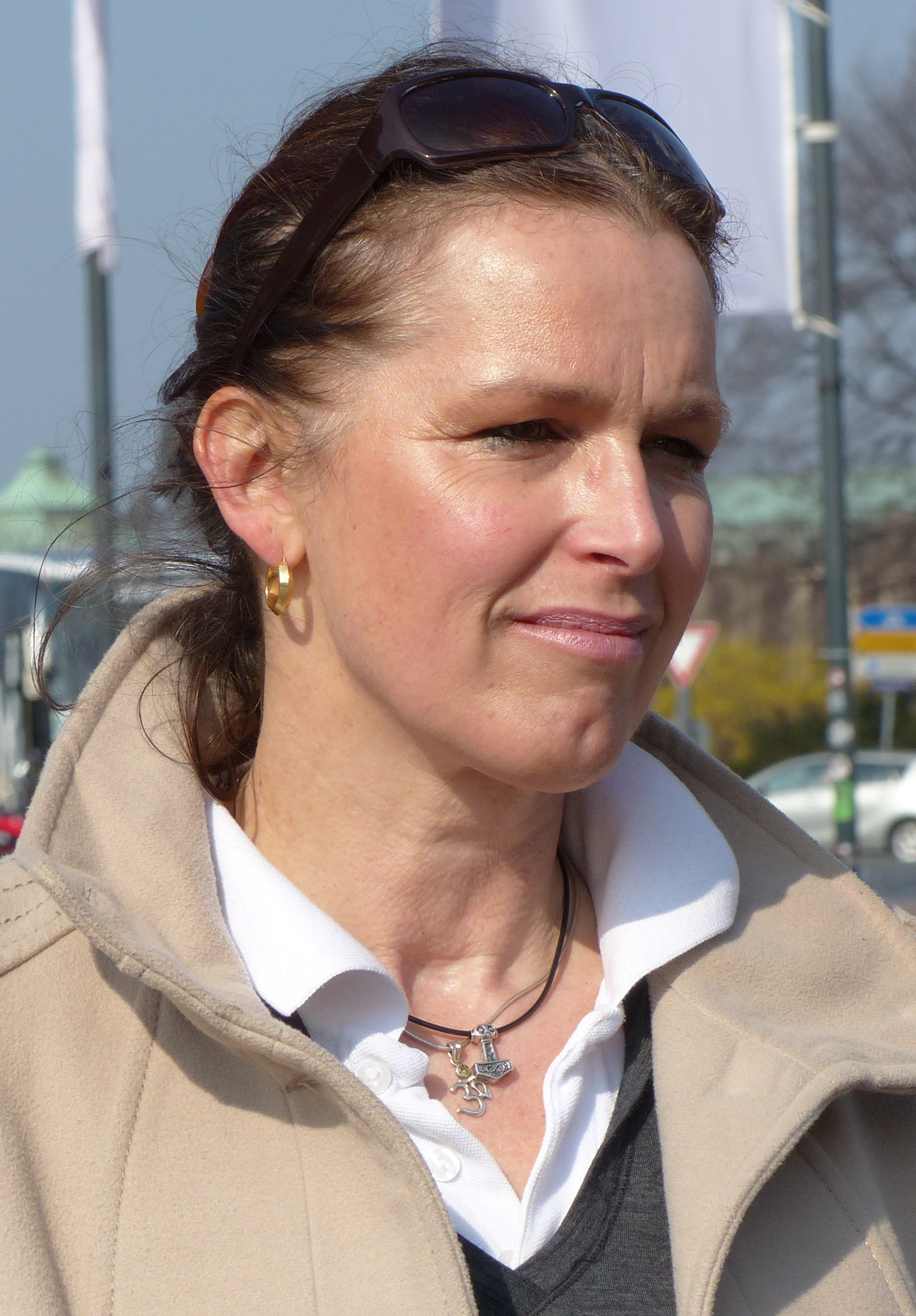
- Festerling in 2015
- Born: Tatjana Schimanski; 6 March 1964 (age 62); Wuppertal, West Germany
- Known for: PEGIDA activist

Tatjana Festerling (née Schimanski, 6 March 1964) is a German activist who was a member of the organisation team of the far-right political movement Pegida. She was expelled from the Pegida leadership for advocating that asylum-seekers should be shot if they attempt to cross the German border.

== Political activities ==
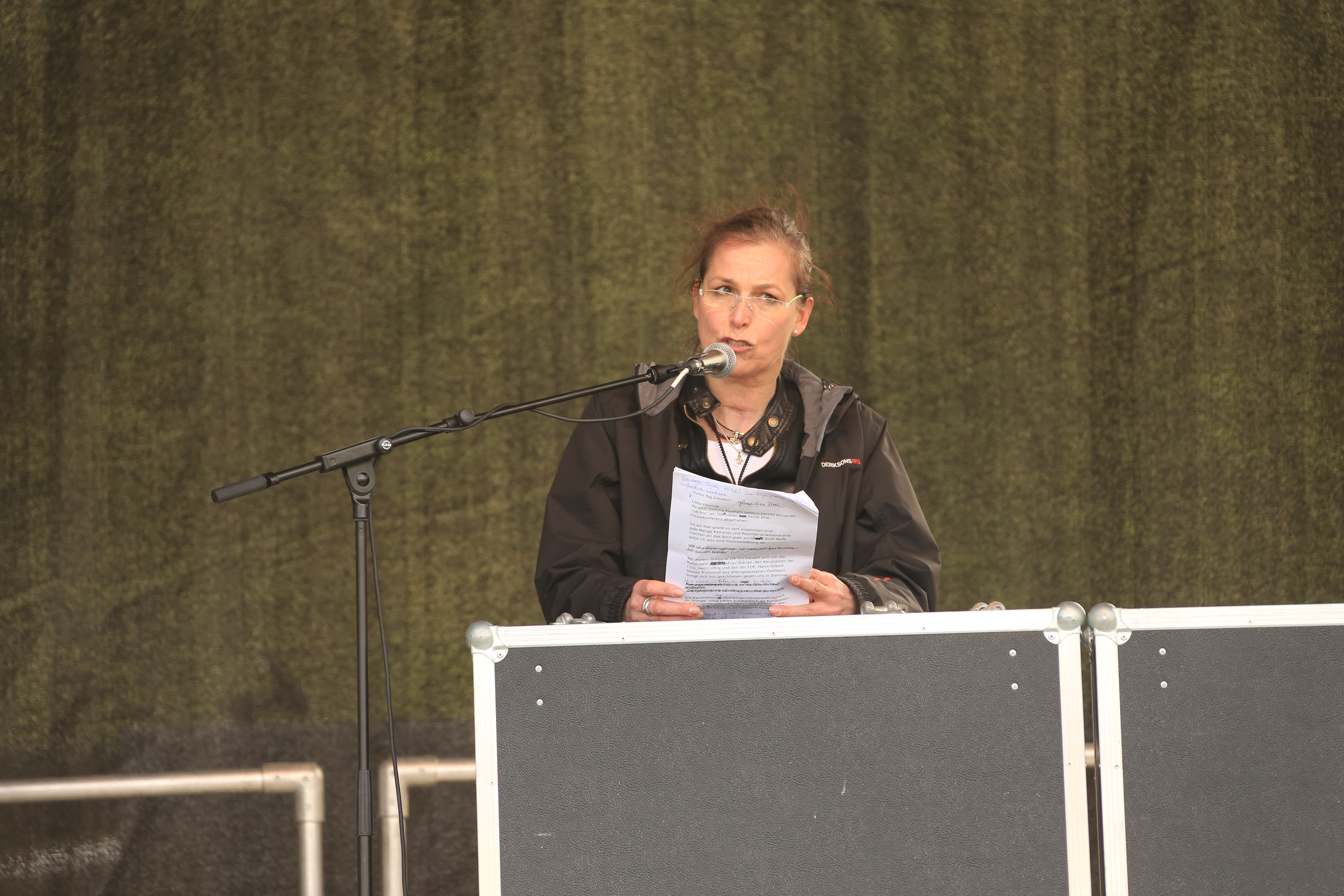
Festerling speaking in 2015

Festerling was a founding member of the Hamburg section of the Alternative for Germany (AfD). She resigned from the party, after a looming threat of expulsion for her condoning action of the Hooligans against Salafists movement.

In 2015, when the 2015 European migrant crisis began, Festerling joined Pegida. In April 2015, she became the first-ever Pegida candidate to run for office. On 7 June 2015, she contested for the mayoral election in the city of Dresden and gained 9.6% of the votes in the election. Der Spiegel described Pegida's decision in 2015 to invite Festerling, a woman, to work with the party founder Lutz Bachmann as an adroit move.

On 9 March 2015, Festerling demanded the rebuilding of the former Iron Curtain over Germany. On 12 October 2015, she demanded the "Säxit" /the secession of Saxony from the Federal Republic of Germany).

In June 2016, Festerling was dismissed from the Pegida leadership. Bachmann stated that her behaviour 'was injurious to the organisation' as the reason for her dismissal. Since then, her activities have included patrolling the Bulgarian-Turkish border area together with a Dutch Pegida leader and local paramilitary forces.

In 2017, she was found guilty of Volksverhetzung ("incitement to hatred") by the Dresden Local Court. The court issued a summary penalty order for incitement to hatred and insult in a total of three cases: two counts of incitement to hatred and one count of insult. Among other things, Festerling had stated: "Muslim baby-making machines are giving birth like there's no tomorrow" and, referring to migrants, tweeted: "Shoot! Aim at them, what else?" The court imposed a fine of 120 daily rates of 25 euros each. In March 2018, Festerling announced publicly that she had not paid the fines imposed on her, did not wish to pay them and was unable to do so, whereupon a substitute custodial sentence was ordered and she was summoned by the Dresden Public Prosecutor's Office to report to Chemnitz Women's Prison to begin serving her sentence. She asked her supporters to make payments to the State Justice Treasury to spare her from imprisonment. This fundraising campaign was a success. Festerling claimed she was a "victim of political persecution".

== Personal life ==
Festerling trained in coaching and yoga and has two grown up children.
