= Lutz Bachmann =

Founder of the anti-Islam Pegida movement

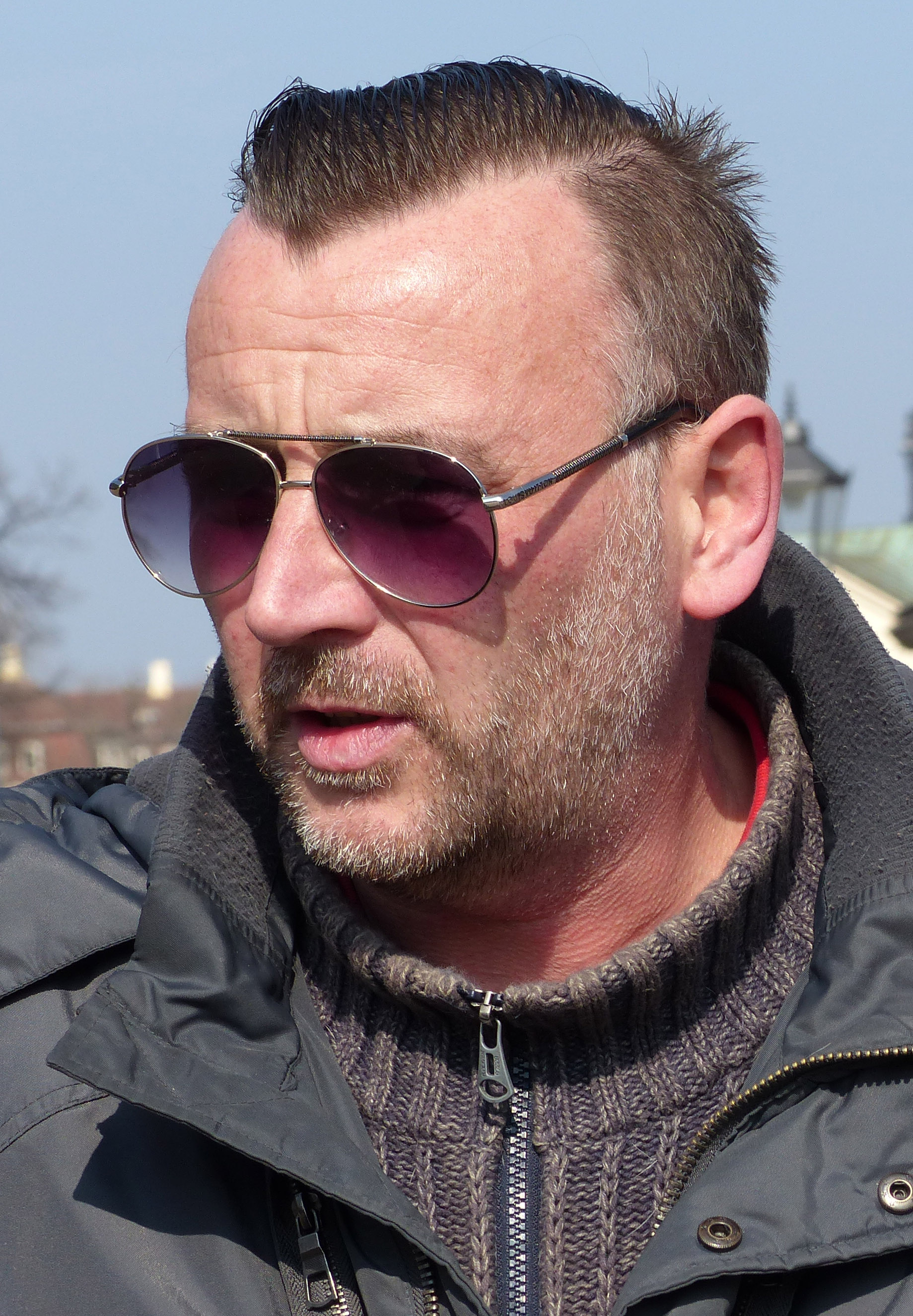
- Bachmann at a Pegida rally in Dresden, 23 March 2015
- Born: 26 January 1973 (age 53); Dresden, East Germany
- Occupations: Chairman of Pegida; Businessman
- Spouse: Vicky Bachmann
- Children: 1
- Website: pegida.de

Lutz Bachmann (born 26 January 1973) is the founder and former leader of Pegida, a former German political movement linked to the anti-Muslim counter-jihad ideology. As leader of Pegida, Bachmann led marches of tens of thousands of people against Muslim immigration. He had a long history of criminal convictions, and was banned from entering the United Kingdom in 2018. Pegida's ceased all operations in 2024.

== Biography ==
=== Personal life ===
Born in 1973 in Dresden, East Germany, Bachmann had a working-class upbringing. Time reports that he is the son of a butcher. He was a chef and graphic designer, and played professional soccer for teams in Dresden and Düsseldorf. Bachmann has a criminal record for sixteen burglaries, dealing cocaine and assault. In 1998, after Bachmann had been sentenced to several years in prison, he fled to South Africa but was deported back to Germany. According to Bachmann, during his time as a fugitive, he opened a nightclub in Cape Town which catered to black people. This was not long after the end of apartheid, and Bachmann says, "It was scandalous. People were shouting at me, 'How can you do this as a German, as a white? How can you open a night club for blacks?'" Bachmann says, "I became a refugee. But a refugee from German law". Bachmann is the owner of a public relations and advertising company in Dresden that he founded in 1992, and has been a publicist for nightclubs.

In January 2014, Bachmann was one of 500 helpers, who was awarded the Saxon Flood Helper Order at a public event by Dresden's Lord Mayor Helma Orosz on behalf of the Saxon Prime Minister Stanislaw Tillich. During the 2013 floods, he had organised the Flood Aid Centre in the former Glücksgas Stadium and collected aid and donations.

=== Pegida ===
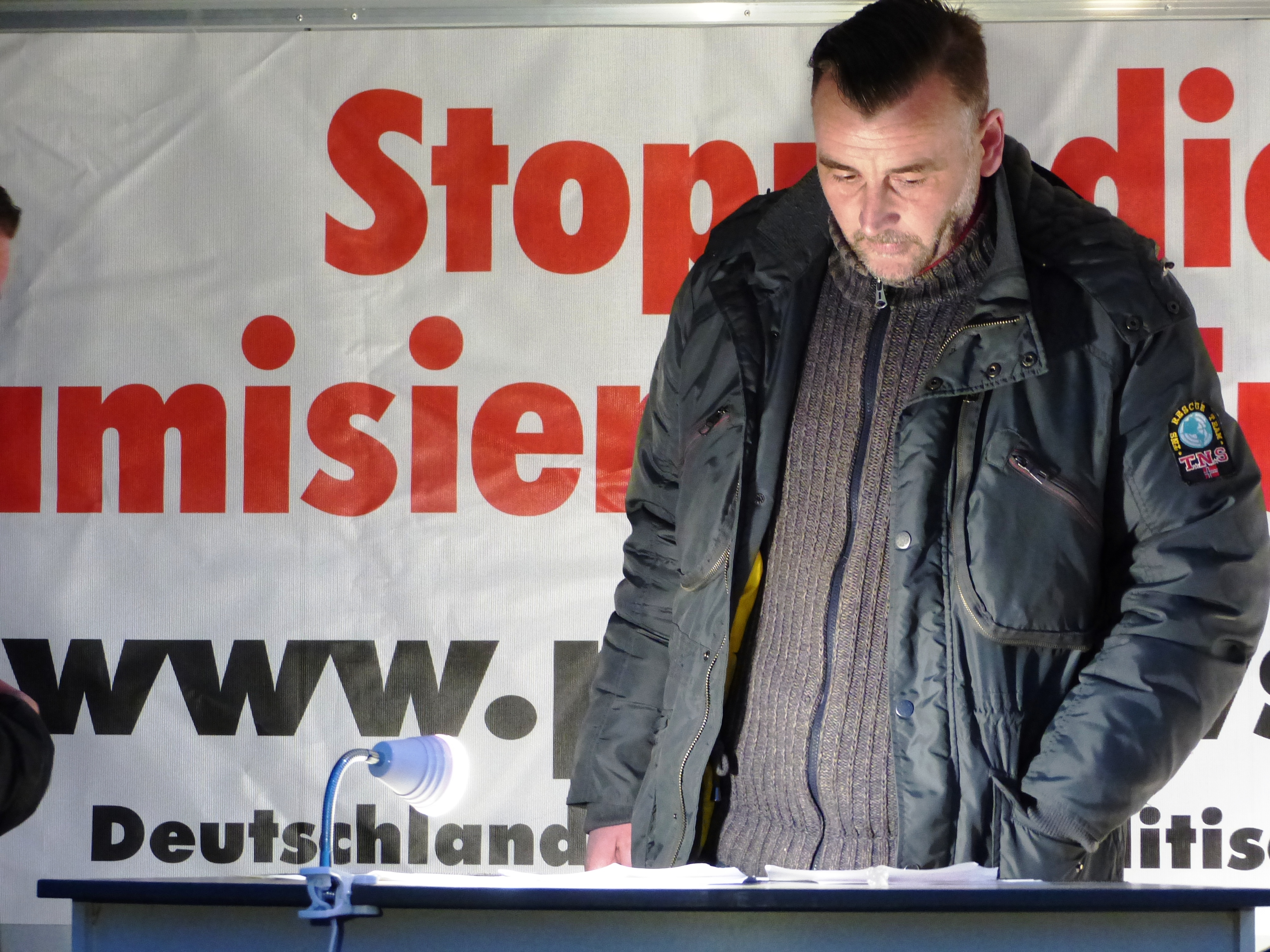
Bachmann at a Pegida rally in March 2015

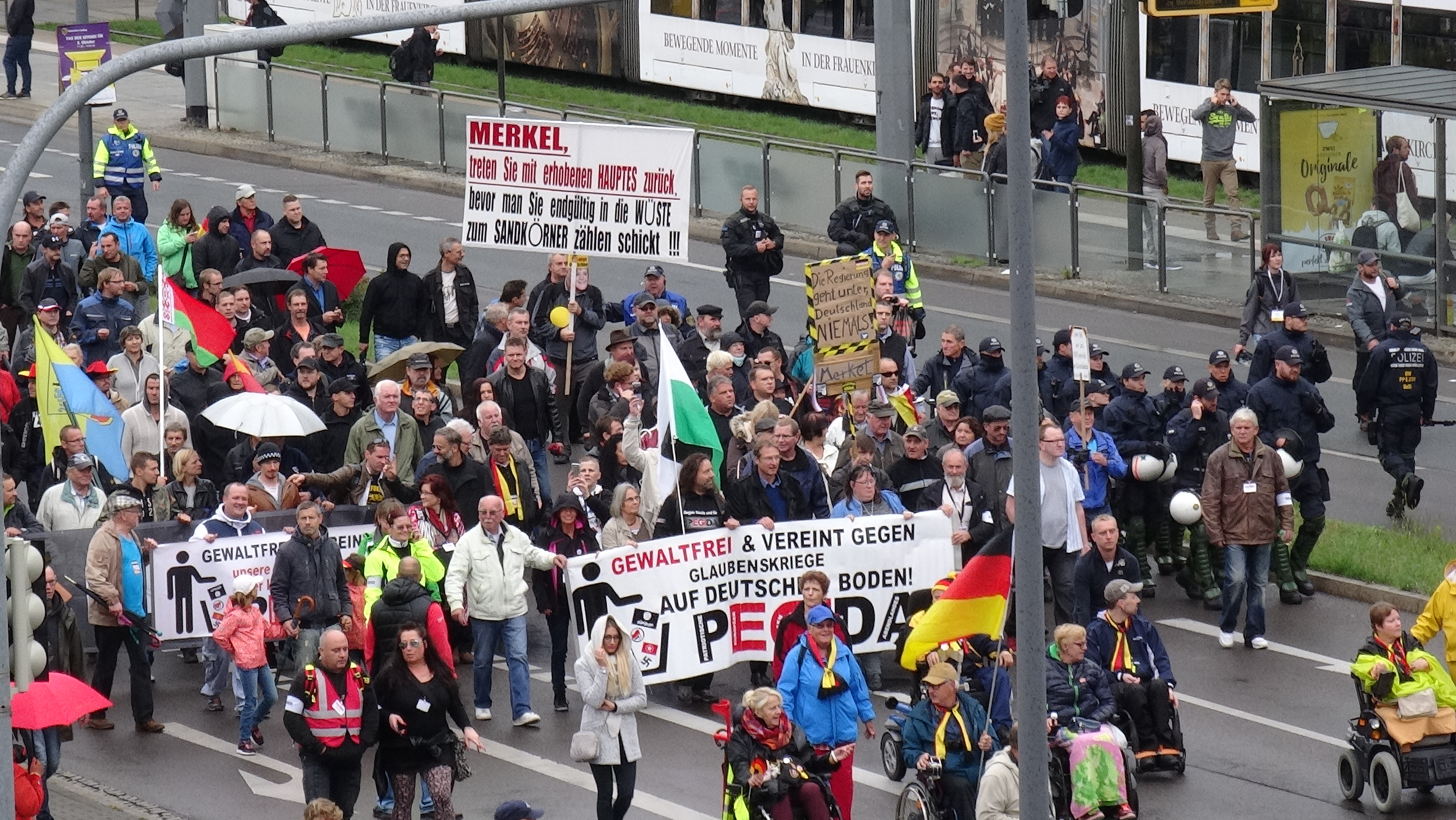
Pegida rally attended by Bachmann in October 2016

Bachmann started Pegida in October 2014 to protest plans to add 14 refugee centres in Dresden, Germany. Through Pegida he rallied the disparate forces of the German right against the "parallel societies" of Muslims in Europe. Bachmann publicly renounces extremist violence of any kind and insists his enemy is not religion itself. As a result of his involvement with Pegida he has been threatened with death and had to cancel a march in Dresden.

In mid-January 2015, Bachmann was criticised after a photograph surfaced showing him with a mustache and hair style similar to Adolf Hitler. According to Bachmann, it was an old photo that was meant as a joke. After the photo sparked international outrage, Bachmann stepped down as de facto leader of Pegida. According to Bachmann and Pegida co-founder Kathrin Oertel, Bachmann's resignation had nothing to do with the photo. A few weeks later, Bachmann was reinstated as a co-leader following a vote. The Sächsische Zeitung later reported that the moustache was added after the photo was taken, with Bachmann asserting that it was a "forgery".

=== Prosecution ===
In 2016, Bachmann was charged with incitement of racial hatred. The charges were laid after someone using a Facebook page with Lutz Bachmann's name called refugees "cattle," "scumbags," and "filth" in a Facebook post in 2014. The first day of Bachmann's trial, which was originally planned on being split into three separate days, took place on 19 April 2016. Bachmann's lawyer, Katja Reichel, argued that there are hundreds of Facebook pages with the name Lutz Bachmann on Facebook, and that there was no reason to believe that the Lutz Bachmann being accused was the one who made these comments. State attorney Tobias Uhlemann has pointed out that nothing originating from the internet would constitute evidence. On 3 May 2016, Bachmann was convicted of "inciting racial hatred" and fined €9,600. Both the defence as well the prosecution were planning on appealing against the ruling.

In October 2016, Lutz Bachmann moved to live in the south of Tenerife where he was declared persona non grata by the authorities of that island.

=== Political party ===
Bachmann has set up the new party Liberal Direct Democratic People's Party (Freiheitlich Direktdemokratische Volkspartei, FDDV). The party was established on 13 June 2016.

=== Further legal issues ===
In January 2017, Bachmann had to answer to the Dresden Regional Court because an aid organisation had sued him due to reputational damage. In a Facebook entry of November 2016, Bachmann had described the aid organisation, which collected donations for the purchase of a ship that was to participate in rescue missions in the Mediterranean, as a "criminally acting private smuggling organisation" and as "law breakers".

In March 2018, Bachmann received a penalty order from the Dresden District Court for sedition and violations of the Assembly Act. Bachmann had published a speech by Akif Pirinçci on the internet, for which Pirinçci was later convicted.

The same month, the State Criminal Police Office of Berlin took up investigations against Bachmann for slander, false suspicion and incitement, because Bachmann had made false claims regarding Keira G. murder case. Bachmann had posted the photo of an innocent young Muslim man with a migration background due to a chance name resemblance on Facebook and accused him offender. The real suspect, an ethnic German, was already in pre-trial detention at that time. The Berlin police warned on the internet against false suspicion in the case of Keira. Bachmann defended himself by simply making an assumption and did not make any factual claims.

A few days later, Bachmann wanted to hold a speech at the Speakers' Corner in London, but was rejected by the British authorities at the London Stansted Airport where he was taken into custody by British authorities, and taken to a deportation facility and flown back to Germany a little later. The British authorities justified the deportation notice with the concern for the public good and Bachmann's criminal record for drug trafficking. He then announced in a video message that the speech he wanted to hold was that of the head of the Austrian Identitarian movement, Martin Sellner. Sellner had also been refused entry a few days earlier. Bachmann then read the Sellner speech in Dresden on a Pegida Monday demonstration.

For the insult of a journalist in August 2019, Bachmann was sentenced to 60 daily rates by the District Court of Dresden in February 2020.

Because Bachmann had published an arrest warrant, he was sentenced to 100 daily rates of 30 euros by the district court of Dippoldiswalde, then appealed, but withdrew it in August 2020, thus being finalised.

In April 2022, Bachmann was convicted of insulting and sedition. The Dresden Regional Court imposed a six-month prison sentence, which was suspended for two years.
