= Peter O'Loughlin =

Peter O'Loughlin may refer to:

- Peadar O'Loughlin, Irish musician, Irish flute, fiddle, and uilleann pipes player
- Peter O'Loughlin (politician), Irish politician, co-founder of Identity Ireland and Pegida Ireland

== See also ==
- Peter O'Loghlen (1883–1971), Irish Fianna Fáil politician
- Peter O'Loghlen (Australian politician) (1882–1923), Australian politician
- Peter Loughlin (1881–1960), Australian politician
