= Opposition to immigration =

Being opposed to non-citizens entering another country

Opposition to immigration is a political position that seeks to restrict or ban legal and illegal immigration. In the modern sense, immigration refers to the entry of people from one state or territory into another state or territory in which they are not citizens. Illegal immigration occurs when people immigrate to a country without having official permission to do so. Opposition to immigration ranges from calls for various immigration reforms, to proposals to completely restrict immigration, to calls for repatriation of existing immigrants.

== Anti-immigration arguments ==
=== National identity ===
Whether and how national identity affects attitudes toward immigration depends heavily on the meanings associated with a particular national identity. If a national identity is defined in an exclusionary way that targets ethnic or racial groups, or if an ethnic or racial majority dominates in the political structures of a nation, then that national identity is likely to be associated with attitudes against immigration. Research also suggests that people respond more strongly to appeals to national identity than they do to economic considerations when they are asked about issues relating to immigration.

Where national identity is not defined in a way that conflicts with ethnic or racial identity, and where such groups are not excluded socio-economically, national identity can be compatible with ethnic or racial diversity. National identity can even be an important factor for social peace in cases where there are intra-national divides. For example, a 2015 study showed that educational content emphasizing the national unity of Indonesia was an important cause of improved inter-ethnic and inter-religious relationships in Suharto's Indonesia.

=== Sovereignty ===
According to Committee of Ministers of the Council of Europe, «the arrival of large numbers of migrants represents a complex and evolving challenge for frontline States, including to their sovereign right to protect national borders and decide who legally enters the territory and their fundamental responsibility to ensure national security and public safety». For these reasons, there would be «a need to step up operational co-operation to prevent irregular migration and promote returns and to strengthen national measures and international co-operation against the human trafficking and migrant smuggling networks involved in mass arrivals».

=== Isolation, separation and stability ===
Immigrants can be isolated in their own communities, forming self-organized communities, ghettos or parallel societies where they live according to their own culture, rather than assimilating to the native culture with a reduced or minimal spatial, social and cultural contact with the majority society into which they have immigrated. Such ethnic enclaves can be the result of humans naturally liking to be around people like themselves. They might not learn the local language and might eventually undermine the national unity, as well as the cultural and religious unity of the native country. Research by Jennifer Neal of Michigan State University suggests that ethnic enclaves promote social cohesion at the cost of decreasing tolerance between groups and that their size, autonomy and proximity are factors. Some also suggest to devolve more power to local communities.

Immigration may adversely affect social and political stability.

=== Import of culture ===
Immigrants bring their culture with them. The immigrants' thinking, their norms, practices, customs and values shape, extend and influence the native country's culture (Leitkultur). Some such extensions and influences might not be desired by parts of the native population, for reasons that may include practises considered less civilized, restrictions as well as collisions with the native country's norms, laws and values in general.

=== Economic costs ===
Opponents of immigration often state that immigrants have a net negative effect on public coffers mainly due to the provisioning of medical care and welfare.

Various factors influence the impact of immigrants to a nation's public coffers and their use of welfare. While immigrants can improve a state's welfare system by for example counteracting trends of aging populations their net economic impact might also be negative. George Borjas, economics professor at Harvard's Kennedy School of Government, states that "the more unskilled the immigrant, the more likely the immigrant will be a fiscal burden". High-skilled immigrants have better labor market prospects than those admitted based on kinship ties or for humanitarian reasons. It also depends on the tenures, wages and ages of the immigrants and the country's integration system.

=== Increased competition ===
Economic arguments concentrate on competition for employment, and the higher burdens that some groups of immigrants may impose on social welfare systems, health systems, housing and public schools of the native state. For example, Denmark's strict immigration law reform has saved the country 6.7 billion euros compared to previous more permissive approach, according to a 2011 report from the Danish Integration Ministry.

=== Immigrant crime ===
Opponents of immigration often claim that immigrants contribute to higher crime rates, but research suggests that people tend to overestimate the relationship between immigration and criminality. The academic literature provides mixed findings for the relationship between immigration and crime worldwide, but finds for the United States that immigration either has no impact on the crime rate or that it reduces the crime rate. The German Federal Police Office has an annual report on crime in the context of immigration which documents a drastic rise in certain crimes like sexual assault.

=== Environmental space, quality and resource scarcity ===
Some people think there is a certain size of land needed to provide for a population ("environmental space"), e.g., to provide for the population's consumption, including absorption of waste products. Immigrants, in this logic, such as a newborn child, reduce the per-capita size of land of the native country.

Some are concerned about urban sprawl and congestion, alterations in the wildlife and natural environment of the state, and an expansive carbon footprint due to immigration. Furthermore, some are concerned over a state's scarce resources, dwindling water reserves, energy, pauperized soils and solid waste.

=== Diseases ===
Immigrants (and cross-border movements in general) can bring infectious diseases uncommon to the native population from their home countries which some perceive as a threat of significance in opposition to immigration.

=== Military unity ===
Some concerns regarding immigration can be found in perceived military loyalty, especially if the country of emigration becomes involved in a war with the country of immigration or if a country finds itself to need conscription.

=== Dangerous journeys ===
Unauthorized or irregular migration can expose immigrants to many dangers, including exposure to harsh environments, lack of food and water, and violence from smugglers and authorities. Since 2014, over 4,000 people have died each year on migration routes around the world, and this is likely to be a low estimate since many deaths are never recorded.

Harshly restricting immigration and making these restrictions known to potential emigrants may prevent them from taking such dangerous journeys. In the United States, the border patrol policy of Prevention Through Deterrence has deliberately acted to divert migrants into remote areas where they are more likely to encounter life-threatening dangers.

=== Damage to migrants' home countries ===
Some opponents of immigration argue that immigration of highly skilled or well-educated individuals may hurt their home countries, which could otherwise benefit from them and build up their economy and improve their social and political system. However, that notion of "brain drain" remains largely unsupported in the academic literature. According to the economist Michael Clemens, it has not been shown that restrictions on high-skill emigration reduce shortages in the countries of origin. According to the development economist Justin Sandefur, "there is no study out there... showing any empirical evidence that migration restrictions have contributed to development." Hein de Haas, a professor of sociology at the University of Amsterdam, describes brain drain as a "myth". Research suggests that emigration (both low- and high-skilled) is beneficial to the sending countries in terms of economy,(speculation) education, and liberal democracy.

Remittances have a major impact on the developing economies of the world with the majority of remittances, $441 billion in 2015, going to developing nations. This amount is nearly triple the $131 billion of global Official Development Assistance. For many developing nations, remittances received make up a significant portion of their economies often receiving over 10% of their GDP in remittances each year. From a macroeconomic perspective, there is no conclusive relationship between remittances and GDP growth. While remittances can boost aggregate demand and thereby spur economic activity, other research indicates that remittances may also have adverse macroeconomic impacts by increasing income inequality and reducing labour supply among recipient countries.

=== No solution to underlying problems ===
Immigration may be the outcome of problems in the migrants' countries of origin. Open immigration policies and efforts do not address the problems.

Jeanne Park of the Council on Foreign Relations recommends European leaders to address the root causes of migration such as helping to broker an end to the Syrian Civil War, restoring stability to Libya, and increasing aid to sub-Saharan Africa. According to her, a political solution to the regional crises can make Europe no longer struggle with migrant inflows. Concerning the migratory and refugee movements in and from the Horn of Africa, Günther Schröder noted that more efforts are needed to deal with its causes. A report by the German Caritasverband stated that only a long-term strategy that differentiates combating the causes for migration in the countries of origin and the development of an EU migration policy can find solutions. Responding to the root causes of illegal migration flows involves co-operation with third countries, including migrants' countries of origin and transit, and might manifest itself in conflict avoidance, peacekeeping and state building. It has been suggested that safe havens be created within the country of origin. It can be argued that immigration means that people "flee" of their country's problems instead of organizing, building up pressure, being involved in constructive foreign aid programs, or otherwise addressing them.

=== Decolonization ===
Some advocates of decolonization view immigrants as colonizers of the native-born or indigenous people.

=== Suffrage ===
Permissive immigration policies tend to lead to worse enfranchisement for immigrants.

== Causes of anti-immigration views ==
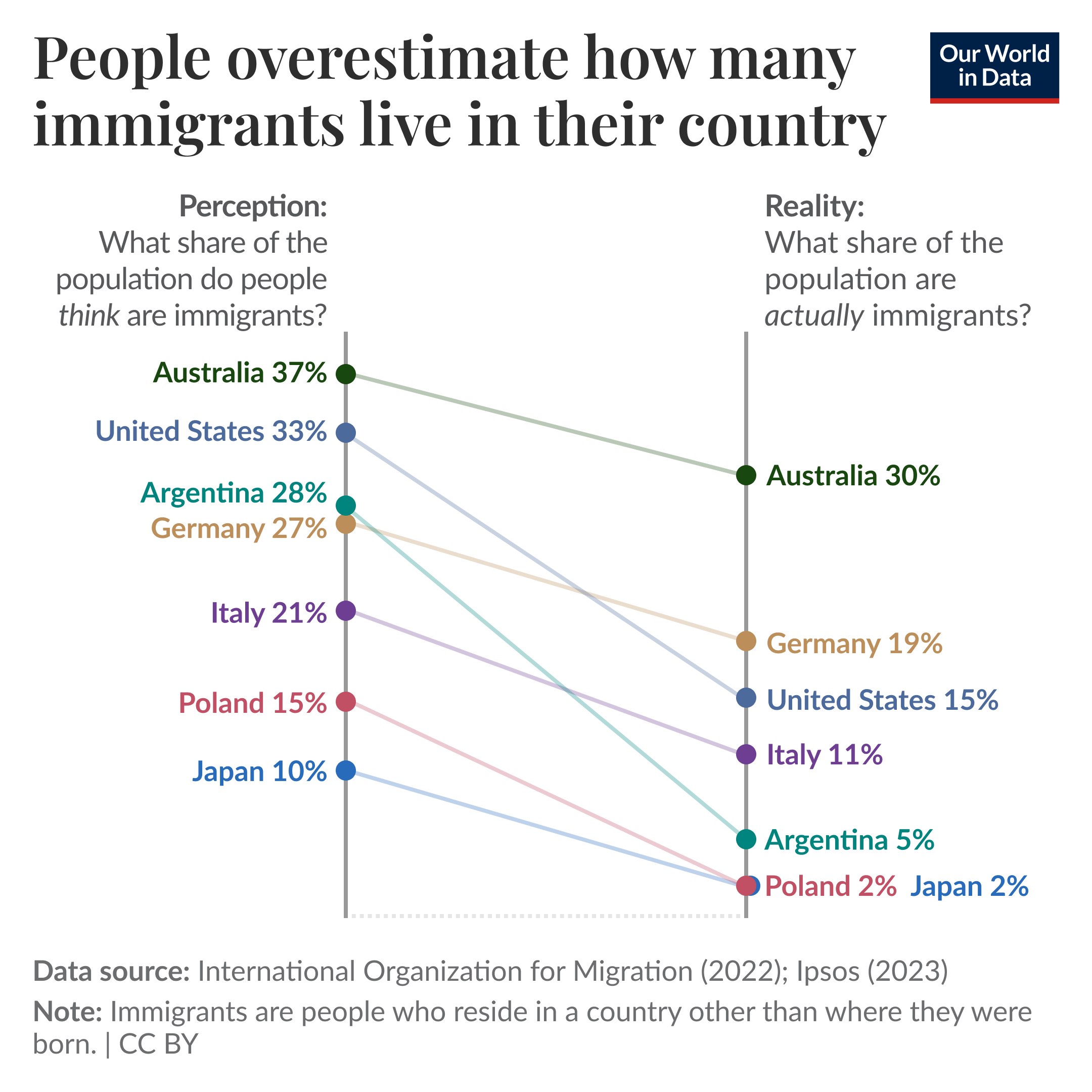
People tend to think there are more immigrants in their country than there really are.

A 2017 study comprised 18,000 interviews across eleven countries: Australia, Canada, Denmark, France, Japan, Korea, Norway, Spain, Switzerland, United Kingdom and the United States. The study found that "higher-skilled immigrants are preferred to their lower-skilled counterparts at all levels of native socio-economic status (SES). There is little support for the Labor Market Competition hypothesis, since respondents are not more opposed to immigrants in their own SES stratum. While skin tone itself has little effect in any country, immigrants from Muslim-majority countries do elicit significantly lower levels of support, and racial animus remains a powerful force."

A paper published in 2018 found that an influx of high-skilled immigration was associated with declines in nationalist voting, but that an influx in low-skilled immigration was associated with increases in nationalist voting in elections during the 2007–2016 period. Perceptions that immigrants are low skilled also caused increased opposition (though high-skilled immigrants are more likely to be welcomed). A 2019 paper from Tel Aviv University identified economic competition, cultural competition, racial attitudes, and fear of crime as some of the most significant factors in opposition to immigration.

Americans and Europeans tend to overestimate the share of immigrants in their countries. Relative overestimation tends to be greater in countries where the actual foreign-born share is low. Cross-national differences in attitudes toward immigration are only weakly related to the actual size, composition, or recent growth of the foreign-born population.

While much research has been conducted to determine what causes opposition to immigration, little research has been done to determine the causes behind support for immigration.

=== Country of origin ===
A study of Europe found that immigrants themselves tend to hold more favorable views of immigration. The same study found no evidence that the native-born children of immigrants hold more favorable views of immigration. A 2017 study found that immigrants who stay in the country longer hold more negative views of immigration than those who have only been there for a brief period, possibly due to assimilating into native society and adopting its views. However, a 2025 study shows that former migrants remain more supportive of immigration than locals even after 40 years spent in the host society, which the authors attribute to the process of cosmopolitanization, triggered by the migration experience.

=== Economic status ===
A 2014 review study in the Annual Review of Political Science found that "there is little accumulated evidence that citizens primarily form attitudes about immigration based on its effects on their personal economic situation. This pattern has held in both North America and Western Europe, in both observational and experimental studies." A study of Europe found the unemployed hold less favorable views towards immigration than the employed.

A 2022 study found that individuals in the United States, the United Kingdom, France, and Italy became less hostile to welfare for immigrants when immigrants had a long work history in the country.

A 2020 study found that "economic anxiety" had little to do with a person's view on the inflow of immigrants in the U.S. The data collected by surveys showed that respondents' negative views/feelings about immigration were not impacted by economic anxiety but instead were impacted by higher levels of ethnocentrism. This means that if someone was anti-immigrant their views were not likely to be justified through economic anxiety or viewing immigrants as burdens but instead, people were more likely to be anti-immigrant based on the higher levels of ethnocentrism the individual had.

=== Education ===
Levels of education are one of the best predictors of support for anti-immigration policies and parties. A 2016 study published in the European Economic Review found, on the basis of European survey data in the period 2002–2012, that "higher levels of education lead to a more positive reported attitude toward immigrants". The authors suggest that this is explained by weaker economic competition between immigrants and educated natives, a higher aversion to discrimination among the educated, and a greater belief in the positive effects of immigration among the educated. A 2013 study in the American Journal of Political Science lends some support to the economic competition theory, as highly educated Americans who exhibit lower levels of xenophobia tend to support reductions in the number of highly skilled immigrants.

A 2007 study in International Organization found that "people with higher levels of education and occupational skills are more likely to favor immigration regardless of the skill attributes of the immigrants in question. Across Europe, higher education and higher skills mean more support for all types of immigrants. These relationships are almost identical among individuals in the labor force (that is, those competing for jobs) and those not in the labor force." A 2018 study in the American Political Science Review found "an additional year of secondary schooling substantially reduces the probability of opposing immigration, believing that immigration erodes a country's quality of life, and feeling close to far-right anti-immigration parties."

One study of Japan found that exposure to information about the benefits of immigration substantially increased support for a more open immigration policy.

A study by Alexander Janus investigated whether social desirability pressures may partially explain reduced opposition to immigration amongst the highly educated. Using an unobtrusive questioning technique, Janus found that anti-immigration sentiments amongst American college graduates were far higher than subjects were willing to state. This indicates that support for immigration amongst the better educated may reflect expression of socially desirable views rather than actual beliefs. Further evidence for this was found in a study by Creighton et al., where amongst the college educated, it was found the stated support for immigration was higher than the actual pro-immigrant sentiment. This was true for other education levels. The study also found that the 2008 economic crisis did not significantly increase anti-immigration attitudes but rather there was a greater expression of opposition to immigration, with underlying attitudes changing little before and after the crisis. A 2015 study found further evidence that support for immigration amongst the educated was mainly driven by social desirability bias.

=== Geographic proximity to immigrants ===
Some research suggests that geographic proximity to immigrants drives anti-immigration views, also described as NIMBY (Not In My Back Yard) effect.

A 2017 study finds that "more rapid ethnic changes increase opposition to immigration and support for UKIP" in the United Kingdom. A 2018 study found that increases in local ethnic diversity in Denmark caused "rightward shifts in election outcomes by shifting electoral support away from traditional “big government” left‐wing parties and towards anti‐immigrant nationalist parties." A 2018 study in the American Political Science Review found that Greeks who had "direct exposure to refugee arrivals" showed more hostility "toward refugees, immigrants, and Muslim minorities; support for restrictive asylum and immigration policies; and political engagement to effect such exclusionary policies."

Some research shows the geographic proximity to immigrants reduces anti-immigration views. The contact hypothesis suggests that intergroup contact can reduce xenophobia. Other research suggests that it is the perception of proximity, not actual proximity, that drives these views. A 2019 study investigated why residents of cities tend to have more positive attitudes towards immigration and cosmopolitanism. The study concluded that it was not living in a city per se that created more positive attitudes but rather the composition of the populations of cities; city populations tended to be more educated, which correlated with more positive immigration attitudes, while people who were more positive of immigration were more likely to self-select into large cities. Cities were also found to be internally heterogeneous with regards to immigration attitudes, with attitudes varying between neighbourhoods.

=== Intergenerational transmission ===
Some research suggests that anti-immigration views are transmitted from older generations to younger generations. A 2015 study found that British communities that were more acceptant of Jews in medieval times show much more tolerance towards 20th-century immigrants (chiefly Caribbean and South Asian immigrants) and 21st-century immigrants (chiefly Eastern European), and less support for the far right.

=== Cultural absolutism and ethnocentrism ===
The belief that some cultures are better than others, called cultural absolutism or cultural racism, is correlated with opposition to immigration. This is also known as ethnocentrism.

=== Biological racism ===
The belief that some groups of people are born with different psychological abilities or personalities was found to be correlated with opposition to immigration.

=== Religion ===
A 2017 study found that emphasizing shared religion can produce more supportive attitudes toward refugees. A 2015 study of the US found that religion did not seem to determine opposition to immigration as while respondents were explicit about opposition to Muslim immigration, they also concealed significant opposition to Christian immigration due to social desirability bias. It was thus determined that religiosity or denomination did not determine explicit or implicit opposition and any differences were down to social desirability bias in this case.

One 2018 study in the United Kingdom found that opposition to Muslim immigrants was not about a more negative view of Muslim (compared to Christian) immigrants but rather about rejecting fundamentalist religiosity. The study concluded that opposition based on religion was thus less about the religious group and more about political liberalism versus religious fundamentalism.

=== Sociopsychological explanations ===
A 2014 review study in the Annual Review of Political Science found that there is substantial evidence in support of sociopsychological explanations for anti-immigration views. A 2007 study in International Organization found that "the link between education and attitudes toward immigrants is driven by differences among individuals in cultural values and beliefs. More educated respondents are significantly less racist and place greater value on cultural diversity than do their counterparts; they are also more likely to believe that immigration generates benefits for the host economy as a whole."

A 2017 study in the American Political Science Review argued that hostility towards immigrants is driven by disgust and can be explained as a psychological mechanism designed to protect humans from disease.

Research suggests that the perception that there is a positive causal link between immigration and crime leads to greater support for anti-immigration policies or parties. Research also suggests that bigotry and immigrant alienation could exacerbate immigrant criminality and bigotry. For instance, University of California, San Diego political scientist Claire Adida, Stanford University political scientist David Laitin and Sorbonne University economist Marie-Anne Valfort argue "fear-based policies that target groups of people according to their religion or region of origin are counter-productive. Our own research, which explains the failed integration of Muslim immigrants in France, suggests that such policies can feed into a vicious cycle that damages national security. French Islamophobia—a response to cultural difference—has encouraged Muslim immigrants to withdraw from French society, which then feeds back into French Islamophobia, thus further exacerbating Muslims' alienation, and so on."

A study of the long-term effects of the 9/11 terrorist attacks in the United States found that the post-9/11 increase in hate crimes against Muslims decreased assimilation by Muslim immigrants. Controlling for relevant factors, the authors found that "Muslim immigrants living in states with the sharpest increase in hate crimes also exhibit: greater chances of marrying within their own ethnic group; higher fertility; lower female labour force participation; and lower English proficiency." A study of Germans found that the 9/11 terror attacks contributed to greater anti-immigrant sentiments. States that experience terrorist acts on their own soil or against their own citizens are more likely to adopt stricter restrictions on asylum recognition.

Research in 2017 also indicated opposition to immigration may be motivated by a person's concern about their group's social position. Studies found that increasing Hispanic immigration to the US caused greater support for immigration restriction amongst both white Americans and non-Hispanic non-white Americans (Hispanic Americans showed no change in attitudes), suggesting that concerns about group position could motivate opposition to immigration. Political ideology can also interact with group social position; in the 2016 United States presidential election white Clinton voters were strongly opposed to the notion of white Americans limiting immigration to maintain their group position but were not generally opposed to the notion of Hispanic Americans desiring to increase their population share via increased immigration, while white Trump voters showed the opposite. David Frum suggests that while mass migration has occurred historically, for societies that have undergone a demographic transition, immigration brings change faster since the native population has fewer children. This causes immigrants to be perceived not as reinforcing the native population but instead as replacing it.

A study in Canada found that anti-refugee sentiments persisted more strongly among people with populist attitudes – on both sides of the political spectrum, i.e. left and right – even when controlling for demographic and economic factors, political interest, and satisfaction with democracy of the participants.

== Opposition to immigration by country or region ==
In 2018, a survey of 27 countries around the world showed that a median of 45% wanted fewer or no immigrants, 36% wanted to keep the current immigration levels and only 14% wanted immigration to increase. The median of those opposing was the highest in countries receiving the most migrants, with 51% in European countries.

Respondents who indicated they wanted immigrants moving into their country
| Country/territory | Fewer/none (%) | About the same (%) | More (%) |
|---|---|---|---|
| Greece | 82 | 15 | 2 |
| Israel | 73 | 15 | 9 |
| Hungary | 72 | 22 | 2 |
| Italy | 71 | 18 | 5 |
| Russia | 67 | 23 | 7 |
| South Africa | 65 | 23 | 11 |
| Argentina | 61 | 28 | 6 |
| Kenya | 60 | 24 | 15 |
| Germany | 58 | 30 | 10 |
| Indonesia | 54 | 31 | 8 |
| Sweden | 52 | 33 | 14 |
| Nigeria | 50 | 26 | 20 |
| Poland | 49 | 36 | 9 |
| India | 45 | 11 | 13 |
| Mexico | 44 | 42 | 11 |
| Tunisia | 42 | 38 | 20 |
| France | 41 | 42 | 16 |
| Netherlands | 39 | 49 | 10 |
| Australia | 38 | 42 | 18 |
| Brazil | 37 | 44 | 14 |
| United Kingdom | 37 | 43 | 16 |
| Philippines | 32 | 46 | 19 |
| Spain | 30 | 39 | 28 |
| United States | 29 | 44 | 24 |
| South Korea | 28 | 52 | 18 |
| Canada | 27 | 53 | 19 |
| Japan | 13 | 58 | 23 |

More recently, a 2025 YouGov EuroTrack survey of seven Western European countries found that majorities in each country surveyed said immigration had been too high over the prior ten years.

Respondents' views on whether immigration over the previous ten years had been too high, too low, or about right, February 2025
| Country | Too high (%) | About right (%) | Too low (%) | Don't know (%) |
|---|---|---|---|---|
| Germany | 81 | 13 | 3 | 3 |
| Spain | 80 | 15 | 1 | 3 |
| Sweden | 73 | 18 | 4 | 5 |
| United Kingdom | 71 | 16 | 3 | 9 |
| Italy | 71 | 20 | 3 | 7 |
| France | 69 | 21 | 3 | 7 |
| Denmark | 55 | 36 | 5 | 4 |

=== Australia ===
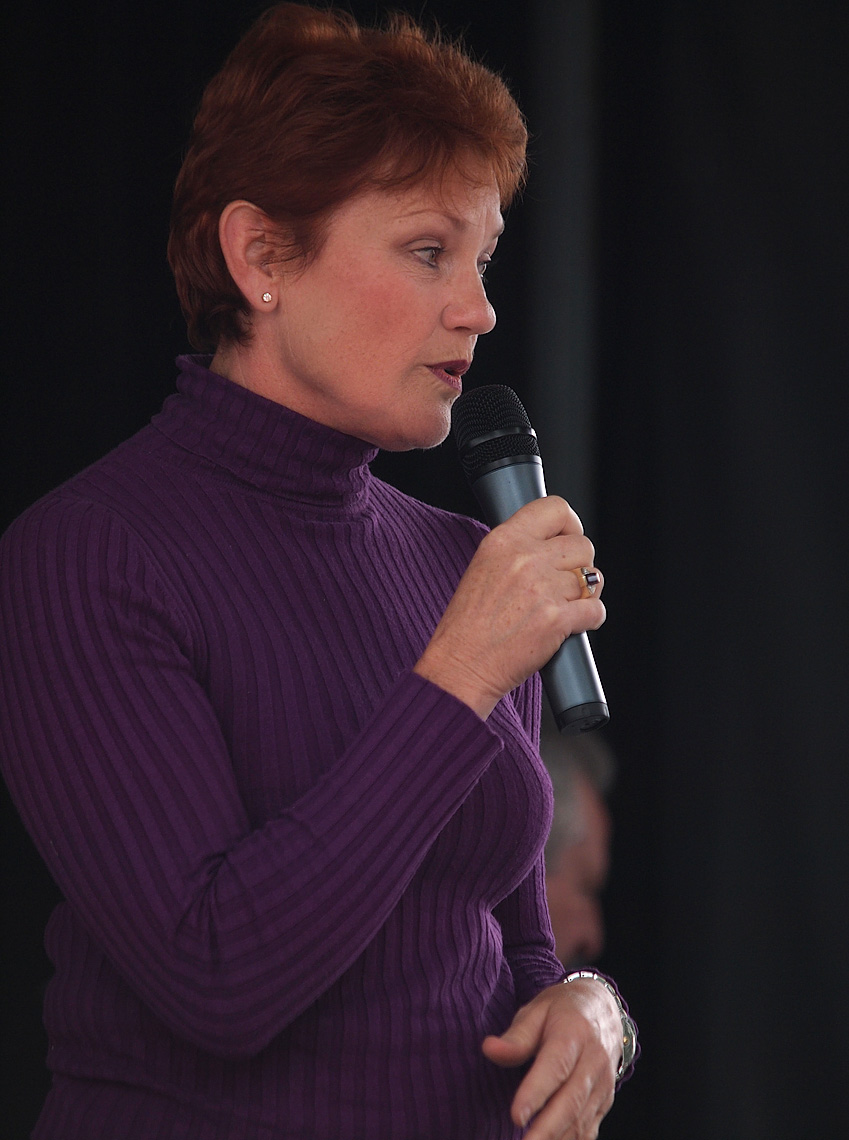
Pauline Hanson said in her maiden speech in 1996 that Australia "was in danger of being swamped by Asians".

The impact of Europeans was profoundly disruptive to Aboriginal life and, though the extent of violence is debated, there was considerable conflict on the frontier. At the same time, some settlers were quite aware they were usurping the Aborigines place in Australia. In 1845, settler Charles Griffiths sought to justify this, writing; "The question comes to this; which has the better right – the savage, born in a country, which he runs over but can scarcely be said to occupy ... or the civilized man, who comes to introduce into this ... unproductive country, the industry which supports life."

A sparsely populated continental nation with a predominantly European population, Australia has long feared being overwhelmed by the heavily populated Asian countries to its north. The standard policy after 1900 was "White Australia", which encouraged immigration from Britain, was suspicious of immigrants from Germany and elsewhere in Europe, and which was quite hostile to immigrants from Asia or the Pacific islands. After World War II, most Australians agreed that the country must "populate or perish". Immigration brought people from traditional sources such as the British Isles along with, for the first time, large numbers of Southern and Central Europeans. The abolition of the so-called 'White Australia policy' during the early 1970s led to a significant increase in immigration from Asian and other non-European countries.

Prime Minister John Curtin supported White Australia policy, saying "This country shall remain forever the home of the descendants of those people who came here in peace to establish in the South Seas an outpost of the British race."

Prime Minister Stanley Bruce was a supporter of the White Australia Policy, and made it an issue in his campaign for the 1925 Australian Federal election.

It is necessary that we should determine what are the ideals towards which every Australian would desire to strive. I think those ideals might well be stated as being to secure our national safety, and to ensure the maintenance of our White Australia Policy to continue as an integral portion of the British Empire. We intend to keep this country white and not allow its people to be faced with the problems that at present are practically insoluble in many parts of the world.

H. V. Evatt, leader of the Labor Party throughout the 1950s, also defended the White Australia Policy. There was a strong view in Australia that any softening of the White Australia stance might result in cheaper labour being imported from overseas. Another prevailing sentiment was that multiculturalism resulted in instability. Evatt, opposing resolutions which could have led to more Asian immigration to Australia, told the Chinese delegation at San Francisco:

You have always insisted on the right to determine the composition of your own people. Australia wants that right now. What you are attempting to do now, Japan attempted after the last war [the First World War] and was prevented by Australia. Had we opened New Guinea and Australia to Japanese immigration then the Pacific War by now might have ended disastrously and we might have had another shambles like that experienced in Malaya.

Arthur Calwell, who led the Labor Party from 1960 to 1967, supported the White Australia policy. This is reflected by Calwell's comments in his 1972 memoirs, Be Just and Fear Not, in which he made it clear that he maintained his view that non-European people should not be allowed to settle in Australia. He wrote:

I am proud of my white skin, just as a Chinese is proud of his yellow skin, a Japanese of his brown skin, and the Indians of their various hues from black to coffee-colored. Anybody who is not proud of his race is not a man at all. And any man who tries to stigmatize the Australian community as racist because they want to preserve this country for the white race is doing our nation great harm... I reject, in conscience, the idea that Australia should or ever can become a multi-racial society and survive.

It was the high-profile historian Geoffrey Blainey, however, who first achieved mainstream recognition for the anti-multiculturalist cause when he wrote that multiculturalism threatened to transform Australia into a "cluster of tribes". In his 1984 book All for Australia, Blainey criticised multiculturalism for tending to "emphasise the rights of ethnic minorities at the expense of the majority of Australians" and also for tending to be "anti-British", even though "people from the United Kingdom and Ireland form the dominant class of pre-war immigrants and the largest single group of post-war immigrants."

According to Blainey, such a policy, with its "emphasis on what is different and on the rights of the new minority rather than the old majority," was unnecessarily creating division and threatened national cohesion. He argued that "the evidence is clear that many multicultural societies have failed and that the human cost of the failure has been high" and warned that "we should think very carefully about the perils of converting Australia into a giant multicultural laboratory for the assumed benefit of the peoples of the world."

In one of his many criticisms of multiculturalism, Blainey wrote:

For the millions of Australians who have no other nation to fall back upon, multiculturalism is almost an insult. It is divisive. It threatens social cohesion. It could, in the long-term, also endanger Australia's military security because it sets up enclaves which in a crisis could appeal to their own homelands for help.

Blainey remained a persistent critic of multiculturalism into the 1990s, denouncing multiculturalism as "morally, intellectually and economically ... a sham".

During the early 1990s, Australia had two parties with their name in opposition to immigration. Australians Against Further Immigration and Reclaim Australia: Reduce Immigration.

In the 1996 election Pauline Hanson was elected to the federal seat of Oxley. In her controversial maiden speech to the House of Representatives, she expressed her belief that Australia "was in danger of being swamped by Asians". Hanson went on to form the One Nation Party, which initially won nearly one quarter of the vote in Queensland state elections before entering a period of decline due to internal disputes. The name "One Nation" was meant to signify national unity, in contrast to what Hanson said was an increasing division in Australian society caused by government policies favouring migrants (multiculturalism) and indigenous Australians.

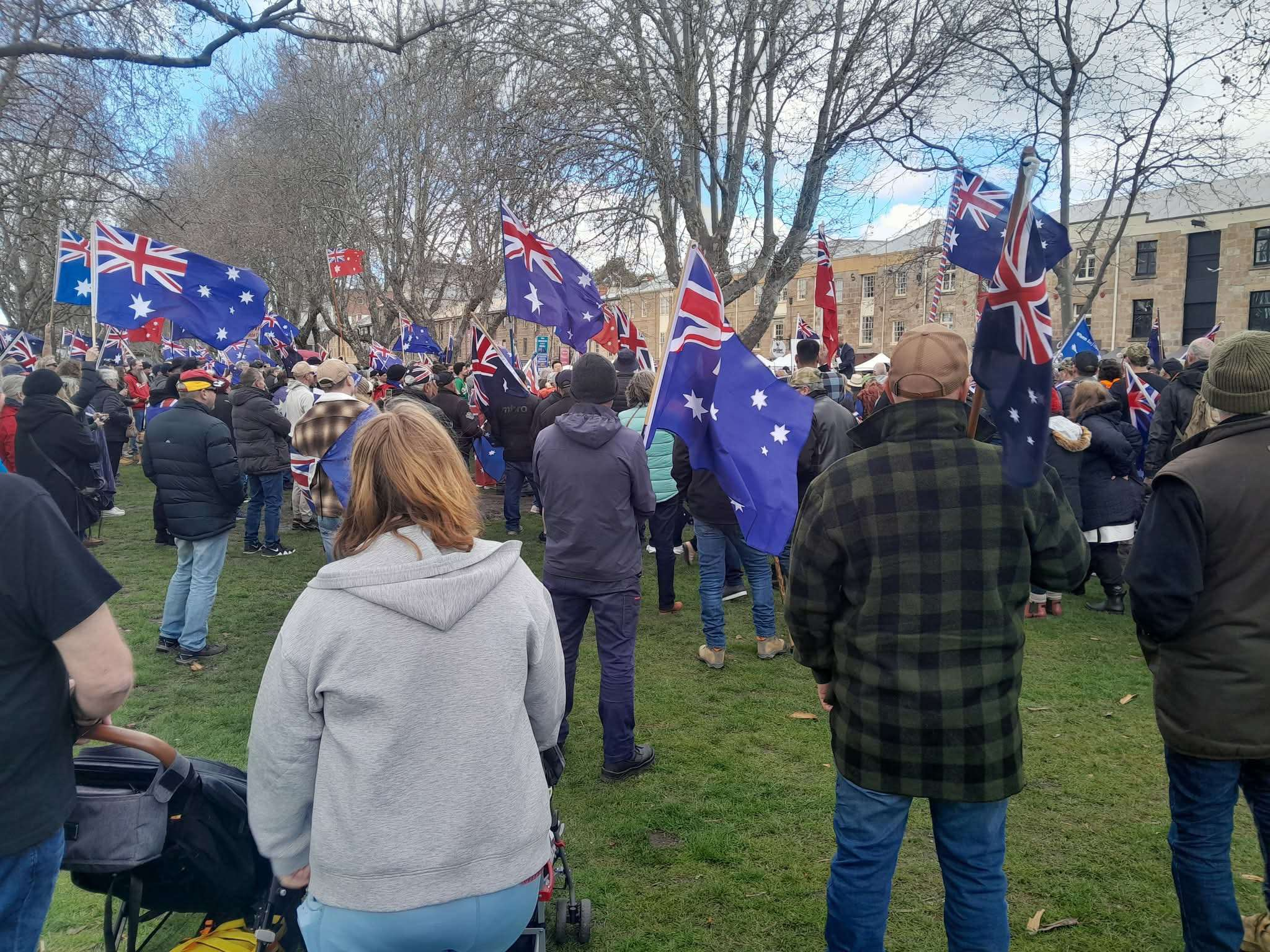
A "March for Australia" rally against mass immigration in Hobart, August 2025

Some Australians reacted angrily to One Nation, as Hanson was subjected to water balloons filled with urine at public speeches, ridiculed in the media, and received so many death threats she filmed a "good-bye video" in the case of her assassination. She was imprisoned by the government on political corruption charges, which were dropped after her imprisonment.

In recent years, however, Hanson returned to politics in 2016 after being elected as One Nation Senator for Queensland, and the rise of other anti-immigrant parties such as the Australian Liberty Alliance and groups such as the United Patriots Front indicates that anti-immigration sentiment may be becoming mainstream.

A December 2023 survey conducted by the Australian Institute of Population Research at Monash University found that 74% of questioned voters preferred lower net migration from abroad. In 2024, the Scanlon Foundation's annual survey found that 49% of respondents said migration was too high. In 2025, data from the ABC Vote Compass showed that 49% of approximately 340,000 respondents wanted fewer immigrants coming to Australia, while 16% wanted more.

In the 2025 Australian federal election campaign, housing affordability and its link to immigration were central points of contention between the Coalition leader Peter Dutton and Prime Minister Anthony Albanese. In 2025, the Coalition has pledged to reduce the annual permanent migration intake from the current level of 180,000 to 140,000.

=== Europe ===
National governments' position on 22 September 2015 European Union Justice and Home Affairs Council majority vote to relocate 120,000 refugees from Greece and Italy to other EU countries according to proportional quotas: Yes Opt-out Abstention No Non-EU state *Malta not seen/marked on map

A February 2017 poll of 10,000 people in 10 European countries by Chatham House found on average a majority (55%) were opposed to further Muslim immigration, with opposition especially pronounced in several countries: Austria (65%), Poland (71%), Hungary (64%), France (61%) and Belgium (64%). Except for Poland, all of those had recently suffered jihadist terror attacks or been at the centre of a refugee crisis. Of those opposed to further Muslim immigration, 3/4 classify themselves as on the right of the political spectrum. Of those self-classifying as on the left of the political spectrum, 1/3 supported a halt. According to a Yougov poll in 2018, majorities in all seven polled countries were opposed to accepting more migrants: Germany (72%), Denmark (65%), Finland (64%), Sweden (60%), United Kingdom (58%), France (58%) and Norway (52%). A 2025 YouGov poll found the proportion of respondents which found immigration in the last 10 years too high was 81% in Germany, 80% in Spain, 73% in Sweden, 71% in Britain and Italy while 69% in France.

Political opposition to high levels of legal immigration has been associated with certain right-wing parties in the EU. The issue increased with the European migrant crisis in 2015 with large numbers of refugees from the Middle East and Africa making dangerous trips to Europe and many deaths en route. With high levels of unemployment and partly unassimilated non-European immigrant populations already within the EU, parties opposed to immigration have improved their position in polls and elections. Right-wing parties critical to immigration have entered the government in Austria, Denmark, Italy, The Netherlands, Norway, Poland and Slovakia, and have become major factors in English, Swedish, German and French politics.

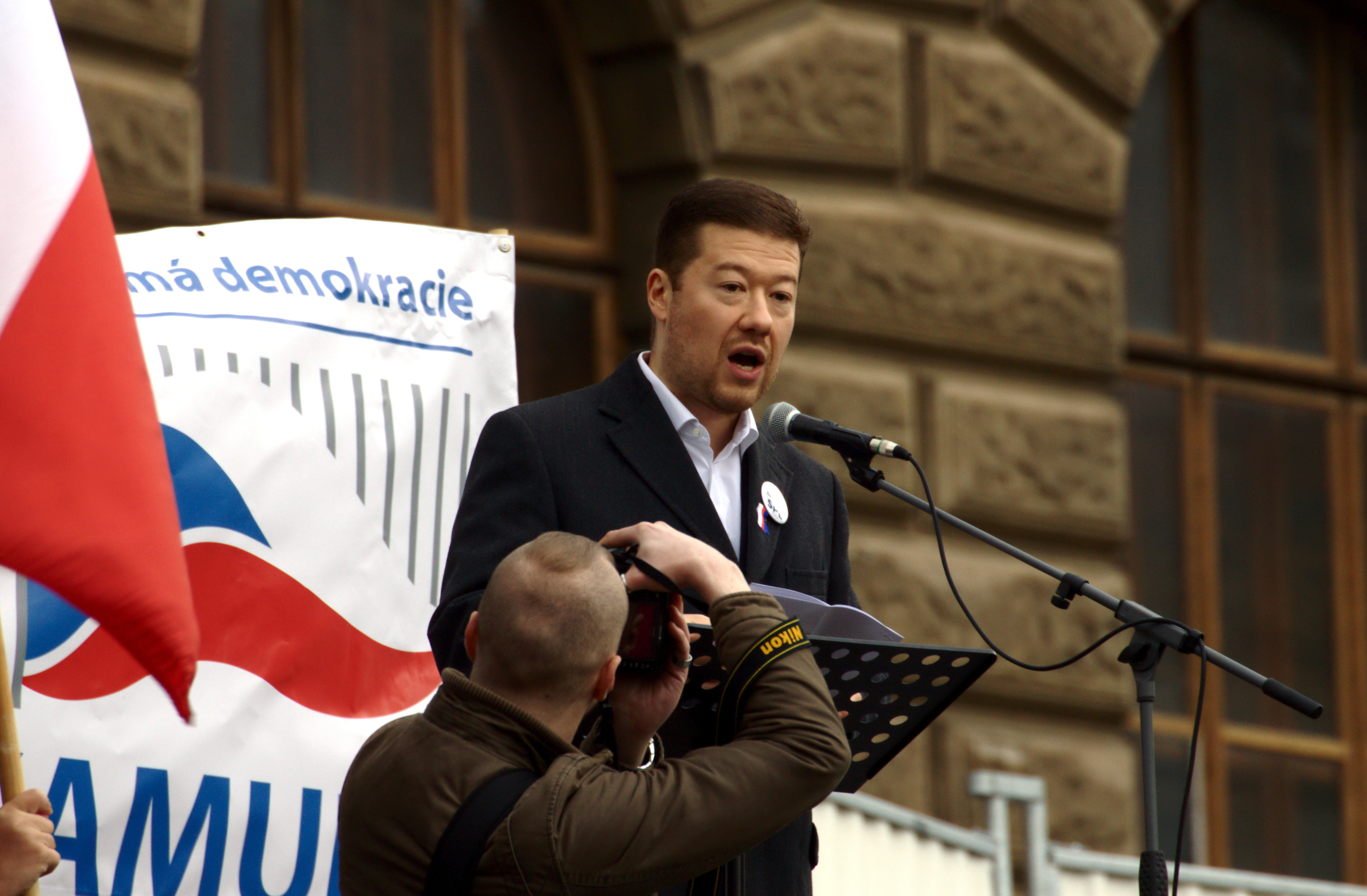
Czech politician and leader of the right-wing populist party SPD, Tomio Okamura, speaks at an anti-immigration rally in Prague, 17 October 2015

Immigration is one of the central political issues in many European countries, and increasingly also at European Union level. The anti-immigration perspective is predominantly nationalist, cultural and economic. A new index measuring the level of perceived threat from immigrants has been recently proposed and applied to a data set covering 47 European countries and regions.

In France, the National Front opposed immigration as of 2000. In the 1988 elections, 75% of supporters of its leader Jean-Marie Le Pen believed France had too many immigrants as opposed to 35% of all voters.

In the European Parliament, some political groups oppose to illegal immigration including European People's Party Group, Patriots for Europe and European Conservatives and Reformists Group.

==== Denmark ====
According to a poll in 2017, two out of three (64%) wished for limiting immigration from Muslim countries which was an increase from 2015 (54%).

In Denmark, the parliamentary party most strongly associated with anti-immigration policies is the Danish People's Party.

==== France ====
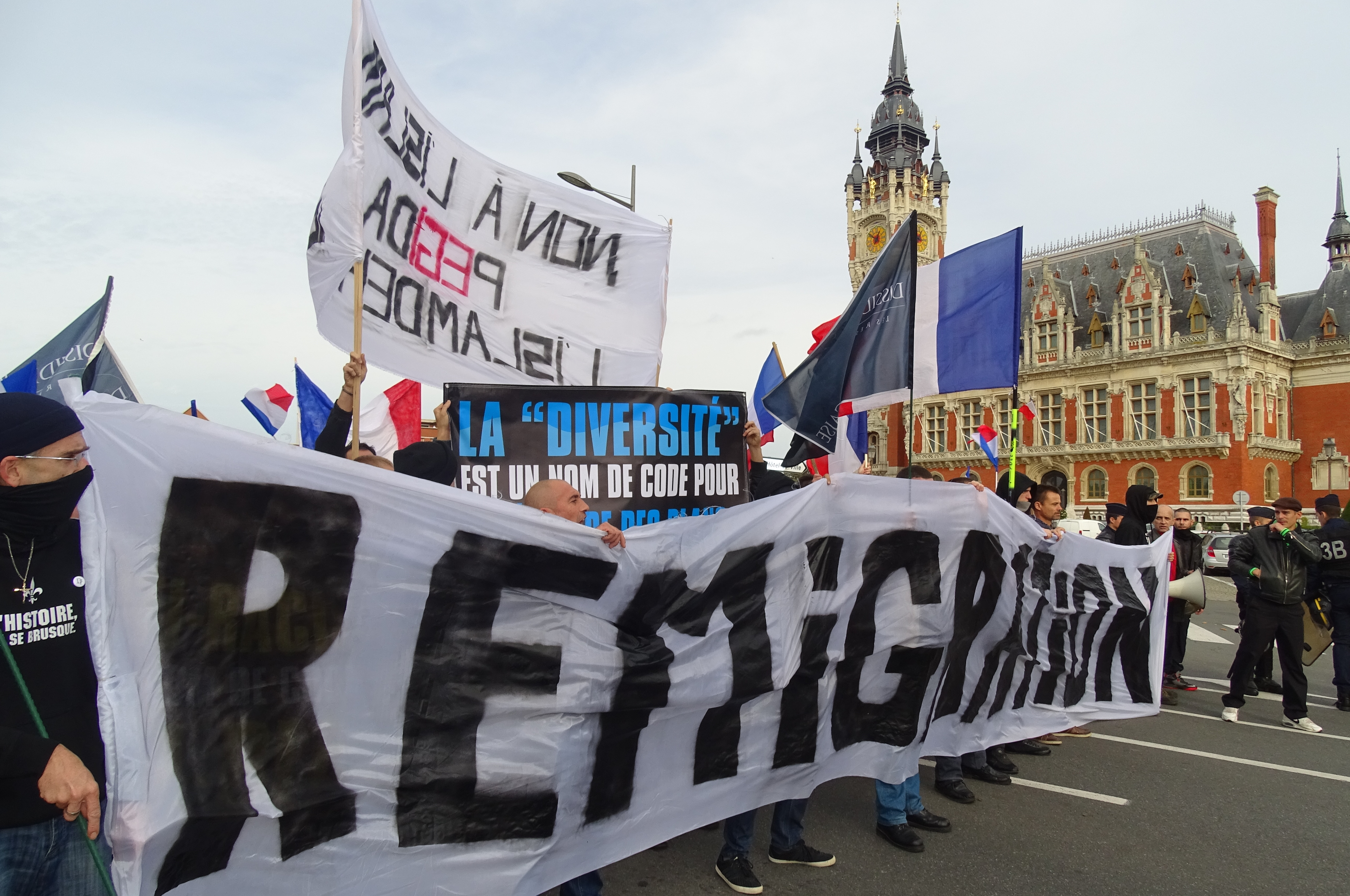
A banner advocating "remigration" during an anti-immigration protest in Calais, France, in 2015

According to an Ipsos poll in September 2019, 65% responded that accepting migrants did not improve the situation in France and 45% responded that accepting migrants deprived the French of social services.

The largest party in Senate Les Républicains have a right-wing populist views on immigration

The National Rally is the largest party in France with anti immigration views.

==== Germany ====
In 2018, a poll by Pew Research found that a majority (58%) wanted fewer immigrants to be allowed into the country, 30% wanted to keep the current level and 10% wanted to increase immigration.

==== Greece ====
In February 2020, more than 10,000 individuals attempted to cross the border between Greece and Turkey after Turkish president Recep Tayyip Erdoğan opened its border to Europe, but they were blocked by Greek army and police forces. Hundreds of Greek soldiers and armed police resisted the trespassers and fired tear gas at them. Among those who attempted to cross the majority were not war refugees from Syria, but the largest group was from Afghanistan and the next largest from Pakistan along with significant numbers of migrants from African countries Ethiopia, Morocco and Algeria. Greece responded by refusing to accept asylum applications for a month. Among the illegal immigrants who were apprehended between 28 February and 5 March by Greek authorities in the Evros region 64% were from Afghanistan, 19% were from Pakistan, 5% were from Turkey, 4% from Syria and 2.6% from Somalia.

==== Hungary ====
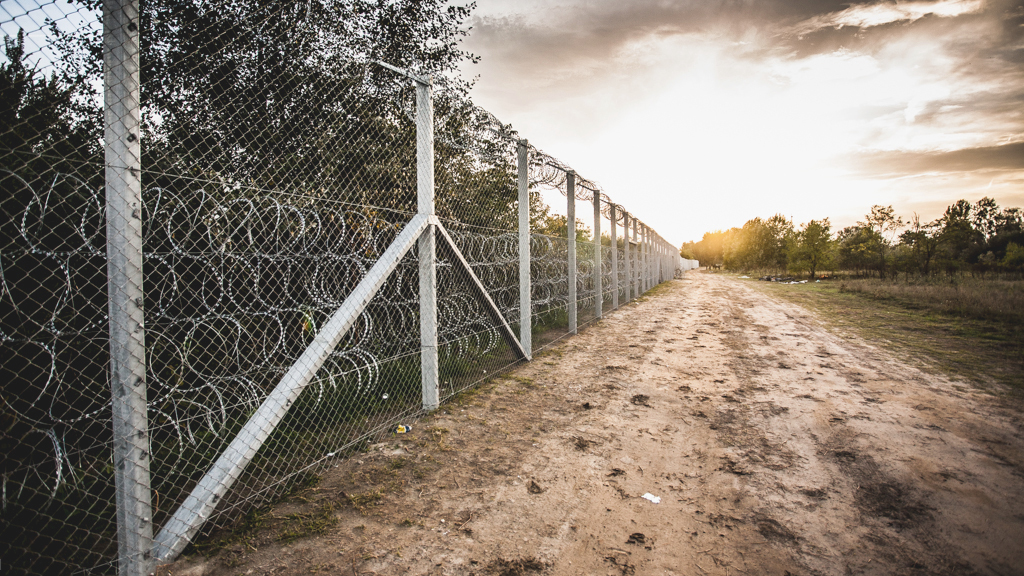
Hungary–Serbia border barrier

In 2015 during the European migrant crisis, Hungary built a razor-wire fence on its border to Serbia to stop migrants from entering the European Union.

In 2016, Hungary held a referendum related to the European Union's migrant relocation plans. An overwhelming majority of voters (98.36%) rejected the EU's migrant quotas.

Mi Hazánk has anti immigration policies.

==== Ireland ====
In 2022, during the Ukrainian refugee crisis, the Irish Department of Children, Equality, Disability, Integration and Youth (DCEDIY) set up transitional shelters for refugees from various backgrounds, which lead to nationwide protests, which the Garda Síochána say numbered 307 in 2022 and at least a further 169 as of August 2023. They started over concerns over the lack of information given to the people in the areas beforehand, an overcrowding of facilities and the existing housing crisis, refugee welfare, and the lack of women and children in the initial group.

As news of the protests spread, far-right protestors used the events to express their opposition to immigration and many have been criticized as being racist, which is what led to the counter-protests in County Cork and in the "Ireland for All" rally. Some minority parties such as the National Party, the Irish Freedom Party, and Ireland First oppose immigration. Independent politicians opposed to immigration also formed the now defunct Immigration Control Platform and party Identity Ireland want to tighten border control restrictions and have been described by the TheJournal.ie as anti-immigrant. There is also an Irish off-shoot of Pegida.

Social media campaigns have united the far-right activists to join the anti-immigration protests. Anti-immigration activists have used Telegram to communicate and started campaigns such as #IrelandIsFull, a hashtag that trended on Twitter. The DCEDIY projected a shortfall of 15,000 beds for refugees in December 2022 and admitted that there was mounting pressure to house 65,000 people.

Controversy has been raised over the loss or destruction of travel documents by 2,232 asylum seekers who were over 16 and traveling through Dublin Airport in 2022 after a freedom of information request. Reports had been made of the destruction of passports during transit in 2019.

In May 2023, a Red C/The Business Post poll found that 75% of people thought that Ireland is taking in too many refugees.

==== Italy ====
According to poll published by Corriere della Sera, one of two respondents (51%) approved closing Italy's ports to further boat migrants arriving via the Mediterranean, while 19% welcomed further boat migrants.

In 2018, a poll by Pew Research found that a majority (71%) wanted fewer immigrants to be allowed into the country, 18% wanted to keep the current level and 5% wanted to increase immigration.

During her 2022 election campaign, Italian Prime Minister Giorgia Meloni pledged to implement a total naval blockade in the Mediterranean to halt undocumented migration. However, the administration faced criticism from portions of its right-wing electorate after sea arrivals reached historic highs in 2023. Her government subsequently expanded legal labour migration through the Decreto Flussi ('Flows Decree'), which set quotas for the admission of 452,000 non-EU workers between 2023 and 2025 to address labour shortages. The expansion of legal labour migration drew criticism from right-wing politicians, who argued it contradicted Meloni's campaign stance on restricting immigration. Critics maintained that the policy prioritized employers' interests over domestic family incentives and measures to increase Italy's birth rate.

This internal friction became apparent in October 2023, when the Florentine regional transport company Autolinee Toscane began to actively recruit migrant workers. Francesco Torselli, the regional leader of Meloni's Brothers of Italy party in Tuscany, publicly condemned the initiative. On Instagram, he questioned the necessity of wage increases for local drivers when employers could instead hire immigrants for lower pay. Political and media analysts characterised the government's approach as a political "sleight of hand". They argued that high-profile rhetoric on undocumented migrant arrivals serves to distract the public from the large-scale admission of legal foreign laborers.

==== Poland ====
In 2023, Poland held a referendum with a question "Do you support the admission of thousands of illegal immigrants from the Middle East and Africa, in accordance with the forced relocation mechanism imposed by the European bureaucracy?. 96.79% of voters voted no. The referendum was boycotted by the main opposition parties resulting in a turnout of only 40% (compared to more than 70% for the election).

In April 2024, Polish Prime Minister Donald Tusk publicly opposed the EU Migration Pact's mandatory relocation mechanism, affirming that his government would take measures to prevent Poland from participating in it.

==== Portugal ====
Portugal had little immigration until a sudden influx in the 1970s, as ex-colonists, most of them ethnically white, returned. After the former Portuguese African colonies gained independence, and because nationals of Portuguese-speaking nations can freely live and work in Portugal without much bureaucracy, an incremental growth of immigration from Portugal's former overseas possessions was observed over the past few decades, primarily from Brazil, Cape Verde, Angola and Mozambique. The country now has nearly 240,000 Brazilians and about 350,000 people born in an African country. Although immigrants are mostly concentrated in urban and suburban areas, mainly on Portugal's coast, Portuguese authorities have in recent times encouraged immigration, notably from Brazil, to rural areas, in an effort to increase an ever shrinking population. The growth of the number of immigrants has been linked to an escalation of anti-immigration sentiments and protests throughout Portugal since the mids 2000's.

Until recently, far-right party "National Renewal Party", known as PNR, was the only one in Portugal which actively targeted the mass-immigration and ethnic minorities (mainly related to Gypsy and African communities) issues. After years of growing support—0.09% 4,712 2002, 0.16% 9,374 2005, 0.20% 11,503 2009, 0.31% 17,548 2011— it managed 0.50%, or 27,269, of the electorate in the 2015 Portuguese legislative election. Since 2019, far-right political party Chega has gained traction in the country. Following the 2019 Portuguese legislative election, the party's president, André Ventura, assured a seat in Assembly of the Republic, after having received over 66,000 votes, 1,3% of the electorate. In the 2020 Azorean regional election, the party secured two assemblyman to the regional parliament and, during the 2021 Portuguese presidential election, André Ventura managed to gather approximately 500,000 votes, 12% of the total. The party opposes immigration and has been described by the media and mainstream parties as xenophobic. Chega has an estimated 28,000 militant members and is expected to continue to rise in popularity and political force.

==== Spain ====
A January 2004 survey by Spanish newspaper El País found that the "majority" of Spaniards believed immigration was too high.

In Spain, as of 2005, surveys found "in descending order, jobs, crime and housing" were the primary concerns for citizens opposed to immigration.

In 2024, Alberto Núñez Feijóo, leader of Spain's conservative Popular Party (PP) and head of the main opposition group, criticized the immigration policy of the Sánchez government. He accused Prime Minister Pedro Sánchez of "promoting Spain as a destination" for migrants rather than addressing the root causes by going to Africa to "combat the (migration) mafia." In 2026, Feijóo further condemned the Spanish government's proposal to legalize approximately 500,000 undocumented immigrants.

In 2026, the Vox party launched a legal challenge in Spain's Supreme Court against the government's plan to regularize hundreds of thousands of undocumented migrants.

In July 2026, following the Morocco–Spain border incident, Italian Prime Minister Giorgia Meloni called for Spain to be suspended from the EU's visa-free Schengen Area. Writing on X, she said that "uncontrolled illegal immigration poses a real threat to the security of Europe's borders." Spanish Prime Minister Pedro Sánchez rejected the criticism and argued on X that Italy had received significantly more migrants than Spain since 2021, citing approximately 478,000 undocumented migrants arriving in Italy as opposed to 234,000 in Spain.

==== Sweden ====
A 2008 study, which involved questionnaires circulated to 5000 people, showed that less than a quarter of the respondents (23%) wanted to live in areas characterised by cultural, ethnic and social diversity. A 2016 SOM Institute survey published by University of Gothenburg reported that between the years 2011 and 2016, the estimated share of people with concerns about the increasing number of immigrants increased from around 20% to 45%. In 2018, a poll by Pew Research found that a majority (52%) wanted fewer immigrants to be allowed into the country, 33% wanted to keep the current level and 14% wanted to increase immigration.

On the question of repatriation of the asylum immigrants, 61% of native respondents in 1990 thought that it was a good suggestion, with this figure steadily decreasing over the ensuing years to a low of around 40% in 2014. In 2015, there was an increase in respondents in favor of repatriation, with a majority, 52%, deeming it a good suggestion. The proportion of respondents who felt repatriation was neither a good nor bad proposal simultaneously dropped from almost 40% to 24%.

In February 2020 finance minister Magdalena Andersson encouraged migrants to head for countries other than Sweden. Andersson stated in an interview that integration of immigrants in Sweden was not working, neither before nor after 2015, and that Sweden cannot accept more immigration than it is able to integrate.

The parties most strongly associated with anti-immigration policies are Sweden Democrats and Alternative for Sweden.

==== Switzerland ====
2014 Swiss immigration initiative; "Do you accept the federal popular initiative 'against mass immigration'?" Green is a Yes vote, Red a No vote.

During the 1990s under Christoph Blocher, the Swiss People's Party started to develop an increasingly eurosceptic and anti-immigration agenda. In 2014, they launched a popular initiative titled "Against mass immigration" that was narrowly accepted. They are currently the largest party in the National Council with 53 seats.

==== United Kingdom ====
Long-term public opinion polling has found that majorities in Britain have often expressed support for reducing or restricting immigration. A 1958 national opinion poll, following the Nottingham race riots, found that 79.1% of respondents favoured some control on immigration. The Migration Observatory at the University of Oxford states that British Election Study data showed 85-86% of national respondents in 1964, 1966 and 1979 agreed that there were too many immigrants in Britain; by 2019, the share answering "yes" to the same question had fallen to 52%. After a period of softening attitudes, concern about immigration rose again in the 2020s, amid increased immigration levels, record net migration figures and renewed debate over asylum and border control.

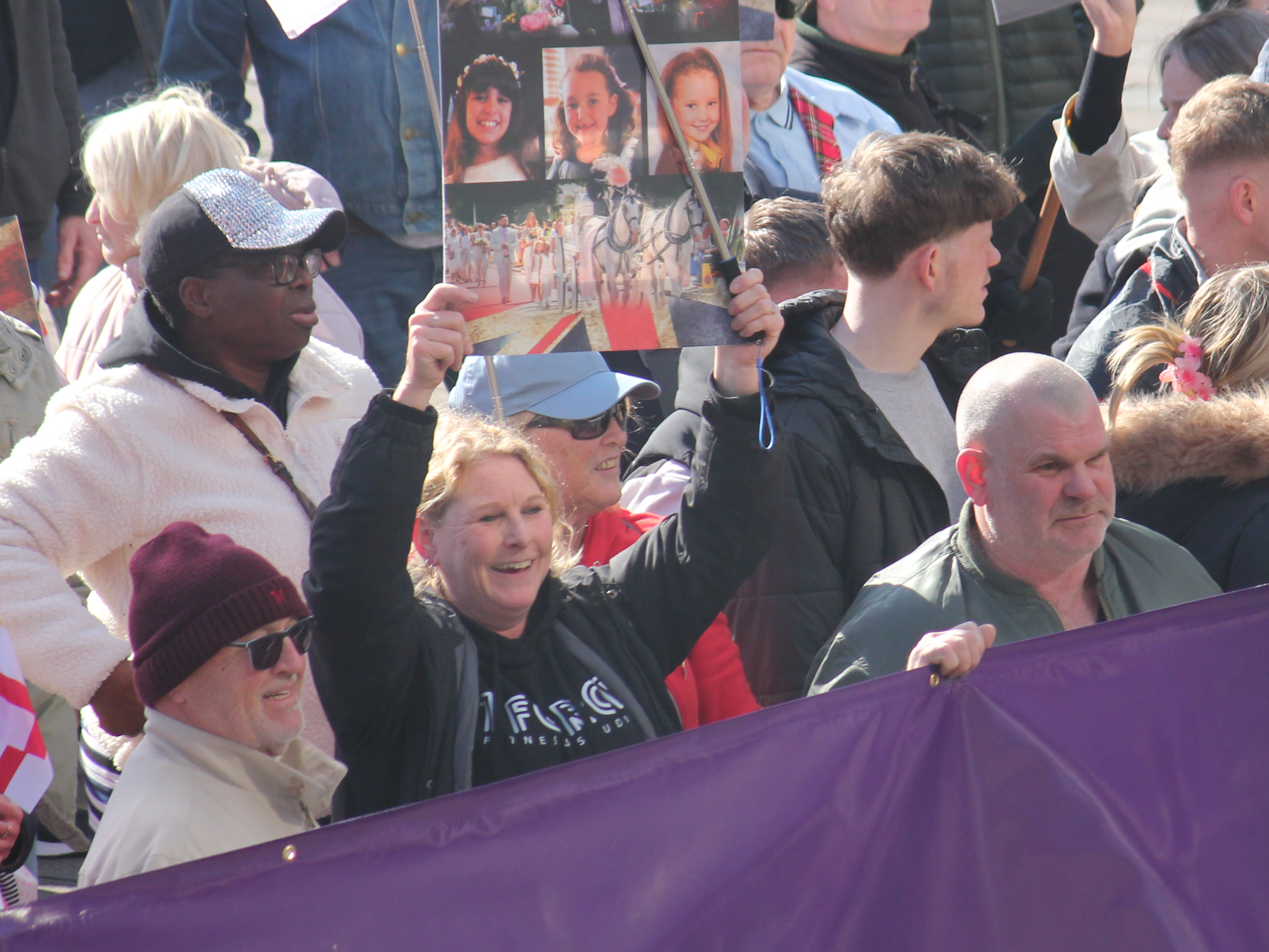
"Let's Take Our City Back" protest against mass immigration in Portsmouth, England, 15 March 2025

Alongside broader public concern about immigration, opposition to immigration has also been a central policy of several British political parties. The British National Party made opposition to immigration one of their central policies in the 2010 general election. In 2015 UKIP proposed setting up a Migration Control Commission, tasked with bringing down net migration.

The vote for the UK to leave the EU was successful in Britain, with several commentators suggesting that populist concern over immigration from the EU was a major feature of the public debate. British Prime Minister David Cameron resigned over the vote. He had agreed to hold a vote on leaving the EU, due in part to the Conservative party losing votes to UKIP.

Following a record net migration figure of 906,000 in 2023, British Prime Minister Keir Starmer pledged in late 2024 to introduce policies aimed at reducing immigration levels.

As of 2025, the British Democrats, Britain First, UKIP, and Reform UK have anti immigration policies.

=== Asia ===
==== China ====
China's immigration policy, governed by the 2012 Exit-Entry Law, focuses on strict, merit-based, and security-driven controls, actively discouraging low-skilled immigration while restricting long-term permanent residency for most foreigners. In 2004, a system was introduced allowing immigrants to obtain permanent residence; however, its implementation has been carried out on a case-by-case basis. Between 2004 and 2023, approximately 12,000 individuals were granted this status. Naturalization rates have been even lower.

==== India ====
India has anti-immigration parties at the state level. Two anti-immigration parties in the state of Maharashtra, the Shiv Sena and the Maharashtra Navnirman Sena, are a proponent of the idea that migrants from Northern India steal jobs from the native Marathi people, with a history of attacking immigrants and accusing them of playing a role in crime in the city of Mumbai. The Shiv Sena also has a history of threatening the Pakistani cricket team from coming to Mumbai and also threatening Australian cricket players in the Indian Premier League, following racially motivated attacks on Indian students in Australia in 2009.

In the last few decades, there has been a rise in the anti-illegal immigration attitudes in the North East Indian states like Assam, which has become a common entry point for illegal immigrants from Bangladesh. Riots have occurred between the native tribes of Assam and illegal immigrants from Bangladesh.

In 2019, the Government of India introduced the Citizenship Amendment Act, which gives a faster path to Indian citizenship for Hindu, Sikh, Buddhist, Jain, Parsi, and Christian religious minorities that have immigrated both legally and illegally from Pakistan, Bangladesh and Afghanistan that suffer religious persecution (provided they arrived in India before 31 December 2014). Any refugees from these groups that arrived after the cutoff must reside in India for at least 5 years before they can gain citizenship. Widespread protests have been held, both opposing and supporting the Act.

The National Register of Citizens is a register of all Indian citizens whose creation is mandated by the 2003 amendment of the Citizenship Act, 1955. Its purpose is to document all the legal citizens of India so that the illegal migrants can be identified and deported. It has been implemented for the state of Assam starting in 2013–2014. The Government of India plans to implement it for the rest of the country in 2021.

==== Iran ====
In May 2025, Iran initiated a mass deportation campaign targeting an estimated 4 million Afghan migrants and refugees. Media reports suggest that, during this operation, individuals holding valid visas and proper documentation were also subjected to forced deportation.

==== Israel ====
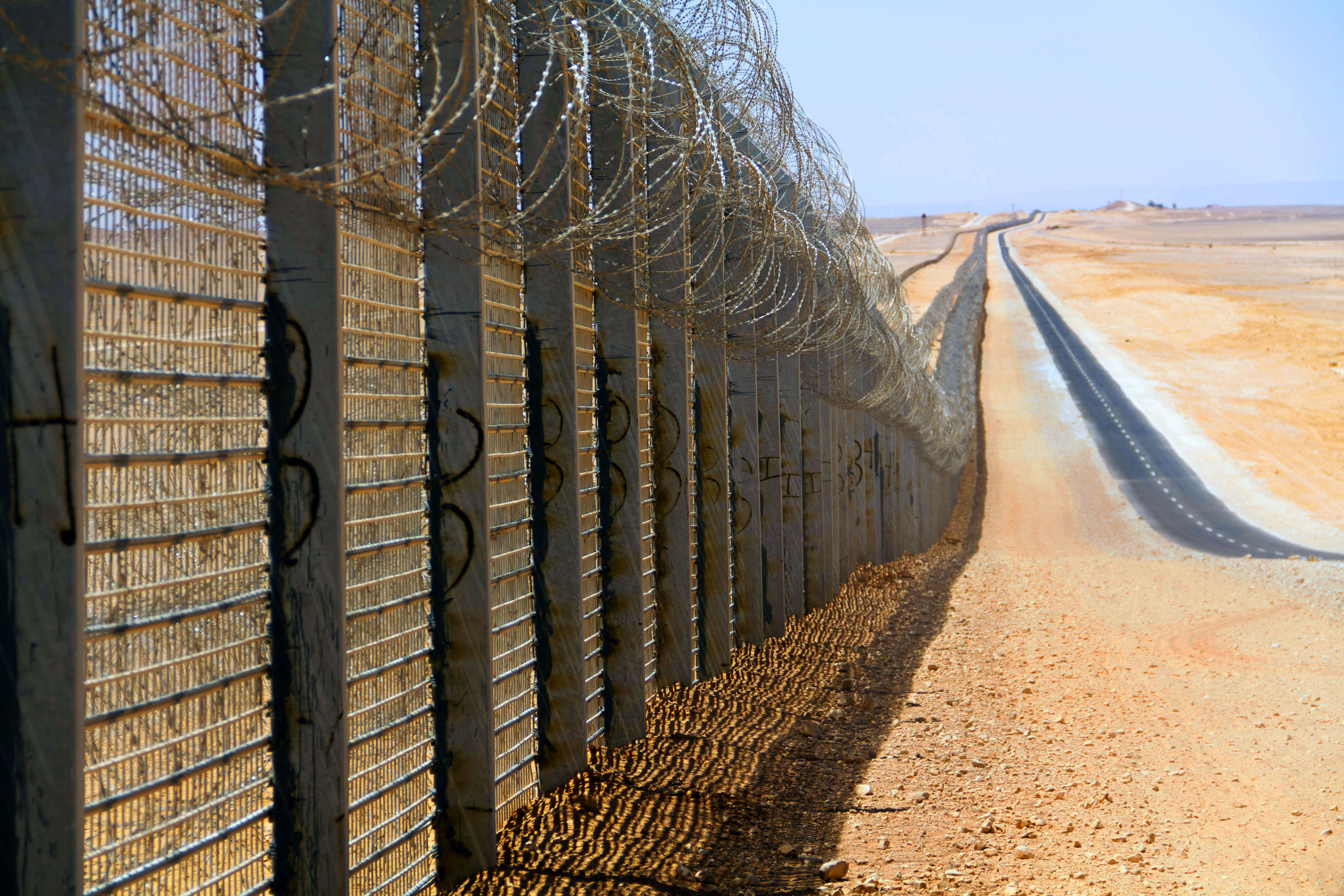

In 2012, Israel constructed a barrier on its border with Egypt which reduced the number of illegal immigrants crossing the border into Israel, from 16000 in 2011 to fewer than 20 in 2016 which represents a decrease of 99%. The government tried offering money to migrants to encourage them to return to their countries of origin, while the Supreme Court blocked the government's attempts to deport them.

In December 2017, the parliament approved legislation which would allow the government to overrule the Supreme Court to deport 40000 illegal immigrants. In the preceding decade, some 60000 illegal immigrants entered Israel by crossing the border with Egypt. Some were legitimate refugees, most were economic migrants.

==== Japan ====
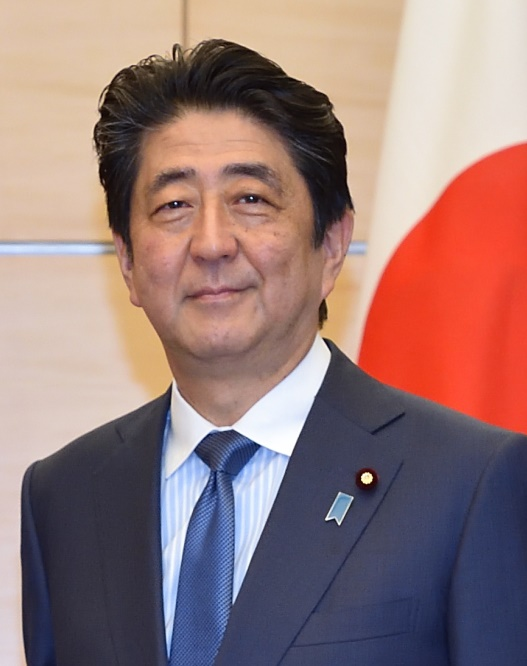
Shinzo Abe, Japan's longest-serving Prime Minister, was known for his policies that generally favored stricter immigration controls.

The movement for Japanese cultural isolation, sakoku (鎖 国), arose in Edo period Japan, in response to the strong influence of Western culture. The study of (ancient) Japanese literature and culture was called kokugaku (国 学; "country study").

In 2015, the Abe government declined to accept refugees fleeing conflicts in the Middle East and Africa. Japanese Prime Minister Shinzo Abe stated that Japan must "solve its own problems before accepting immigrants." He supported a temporary work visa program that would allow migrant workers to "work for a limited period, earn more and return home."

Like her fellow candidates in the 2025 LDP leadership election, Japanese Prime Minister Sanae Takaichi has been described as taking a "hard-line stance" on immigration. The New York Times stated that during her leadership campaign "she seized on a wave of anti-immigrant sentiment". Specifically she has been described as wanting "tighter restrictions on immigration" and employed "anti-immigration rhetoric" during her campaign.

==== Pakistan ====
In October 2023, the government of Pakistan announced a plan to deport foreign nationals who either lacked valid visas or had overstayed their visas by more than one year. The mass deportations primarily targeted Afghan nationals without legal documentation to remain in Pakistan. By November 2025, Pakistan had repatriated a total of 1.7 million Afghans.

==== South Korea ====
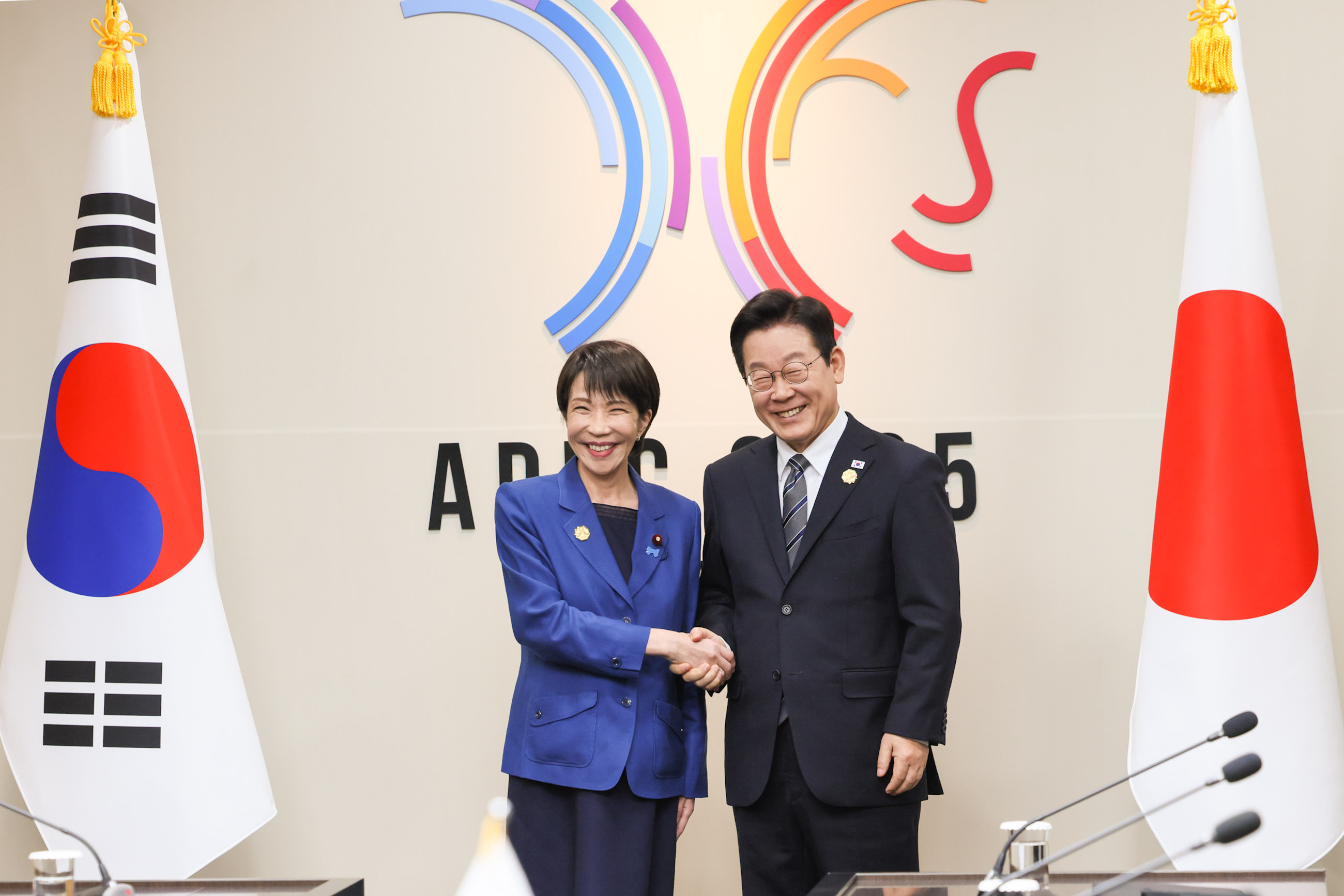
South Korean President Lee Jae-myung (right) and Japanese Prime Minister Sanae Takaichi in Gyeongju, South Korea, October 2025. Both leaders have advocated for stricter immigration policies.

South Korea's immigration policy balances a critical need for foreign labor with strict control measures to prevent unauthorized stay, focusing on temporary, managed, and skill-specific entry rather than permanent immigration. While expanding quotas for skilled workers, the government maintains rigorous enforcement against undocumented residents.

In 2018, the arrival of approximately 500 Yemeni asylum seekers on Jeju Island prompted widespread and intense anti-immigrant sentiment. In response, over 700,000 individuals signed an online petition urging the government to reject asylum applications from Yemeni refugees and to deport them.

Since taking office in June 2025, President Lee Jae Myung has pursued a policy shift aiming to reduce South Korea's reliance on low-wage foreign labor, arguing that the heavy reliance on migrant workers in key industries undermines domestic wage levels. His administration initiated a policy to raise the minimum salary for foreign workers and implemented a 40% reduction in foreign work visas scheduled for 2026, while also reviewing the autonomous visa issuance authority of local governments. Furthermore, Lee has advocated for tighter regulations under the Refugee Act, including restrictions on re-application for denied asylum seekers.

==== Turkey ====
Established against the increasing number of legal and illegal refugees in Turkey as much as several millions, Victory Party (Turkey) has been the leader of return of the refugees to their home countries in Turkey since the day it was founded. The Victory Party's founding manifesto has numerous references to the founding father of the modern Turkish Republic, Mustafa Kemal Atatürk and his nationalist revolution after World War I. Ümit Özdağ defines the mass refugee influx from the Middle East to Turkey as “strategically engineered migration”—a renewed imperialist plot, resurfacing a century after the republic's inception (referencing to the Treaty of Sèvres of 1920). Only this time, Ümit Özdağ suggests, the imperialists will not use a “rental Greek army” to upend Turkey's sovereignty; they will instead install a Sunni Arab population of refugees to undermine Turkish national identity.

The Victory Party promises to send all fugitives and asylum seekers within one year. Although there is not a very high rate of votes among the public for now, it seems to have received 4.1% of the votes in some polls. The slogan of the party is "Victory Party will come, refugees will go." Foreign policy reported on Victory Party (Turkey) and Ümit Özdağ Turkey’s Far Right Has Already Won

=== Americas ===
==== Argentina ====
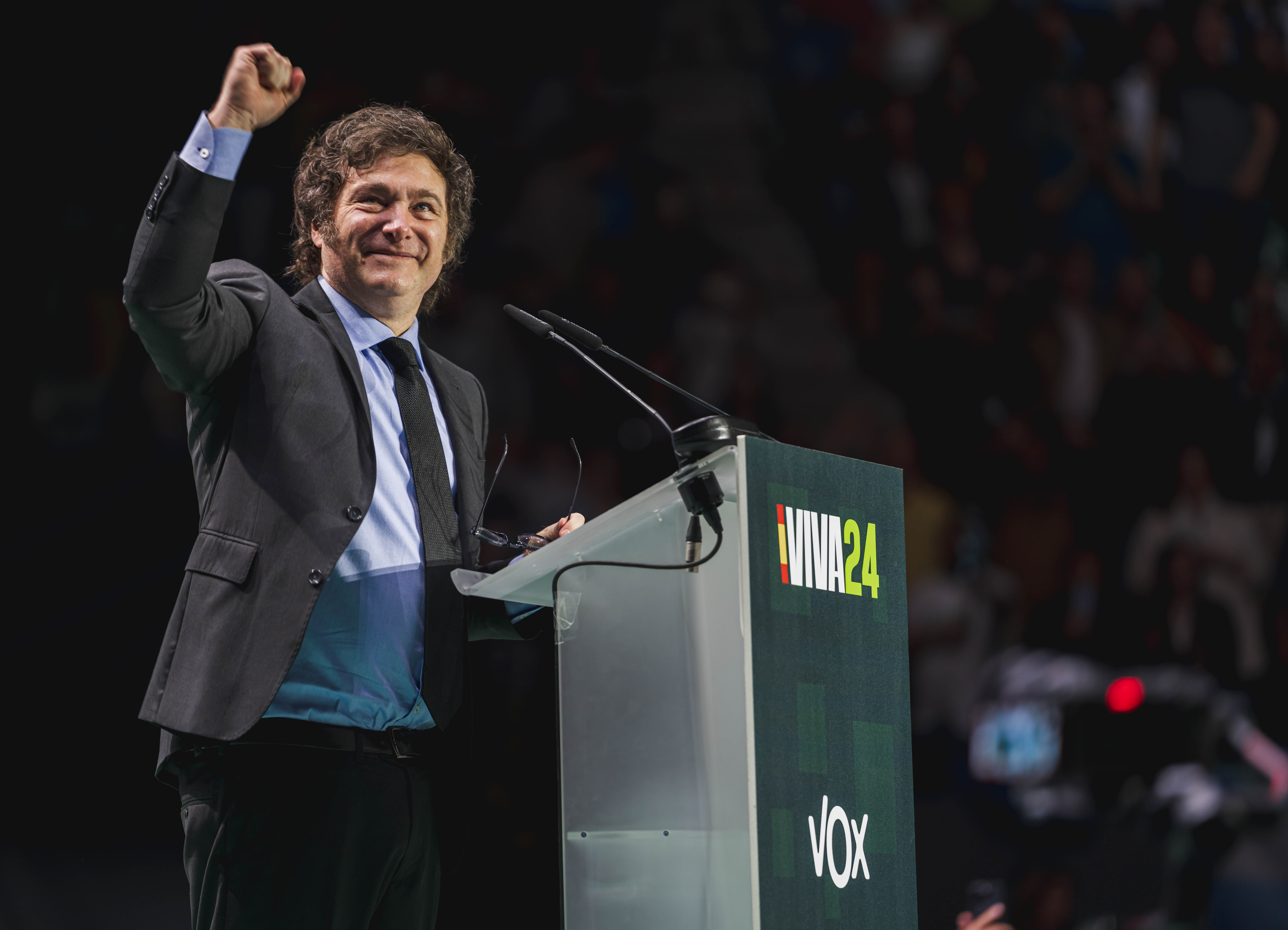
Argentine President Javier Milei

President Javier Milei has shifted Argentina toward a significantly more restrictive immigration stance, characterized by expedited deportations and reduced access to social services for non-residents. In late 2025, the Milei administration announced the creation of a new "Agencia Nacional de Migraciones" (National Immigration Agency), moving control from the Interior Ministry to the Security Ministry, with a focus on border control and security, described by some as an Argentine equivalent to U.S. Immigration and Customs Enforcement (ICE).

==== Brazil ====
Brazil is a country of immigrants and developed a reputation for "warm welcome" of people all over the world. Nevertheless, different analysts often dispute how truthful this image is and, although openly xenophobic manifestation were uncommon, some scholars denounce it existence in more subtle ways.

Despite the fact that Brazil was considered a safe haven for neighboring refugees and immigrants, xenophobic violence has erupted. Brazil received up to 3000 Syrian refugees becoming the largest receiver of such in Latin America. However, xenophobic and islamophobic attacks were reported against Syrian refugees and Muslims in general. After the alleged beating of a shop owner during a robbery by alleged Venezuelan migrants, riots occurred in the Brazilian-Venezuelan border which included attacks on Venezuelans nationals, destruction of refugee tents and fires. 1200 Venezuelans went back to their homeland as a result and the administration of President Michel Temer increased military personnel in the border. The burning of the refugee camps was reported in national and international news outlet and the authorities announce they will investigate and prosecute the authors.

During the Brazilian general election in 2018, then far-right presidential candidate Jair Bolsonaro said the government should not turn its back on popular sentiment in Roraima, and proposed the creation of refugee camps with the help of the United Nations. Once he became president, Bolsonaro said he would adopt more rigorous criteria for the entry of foreigners to Brazil, but ruled that he would not repatriate Venezuelan immigrants to their country.

==== Canada ====
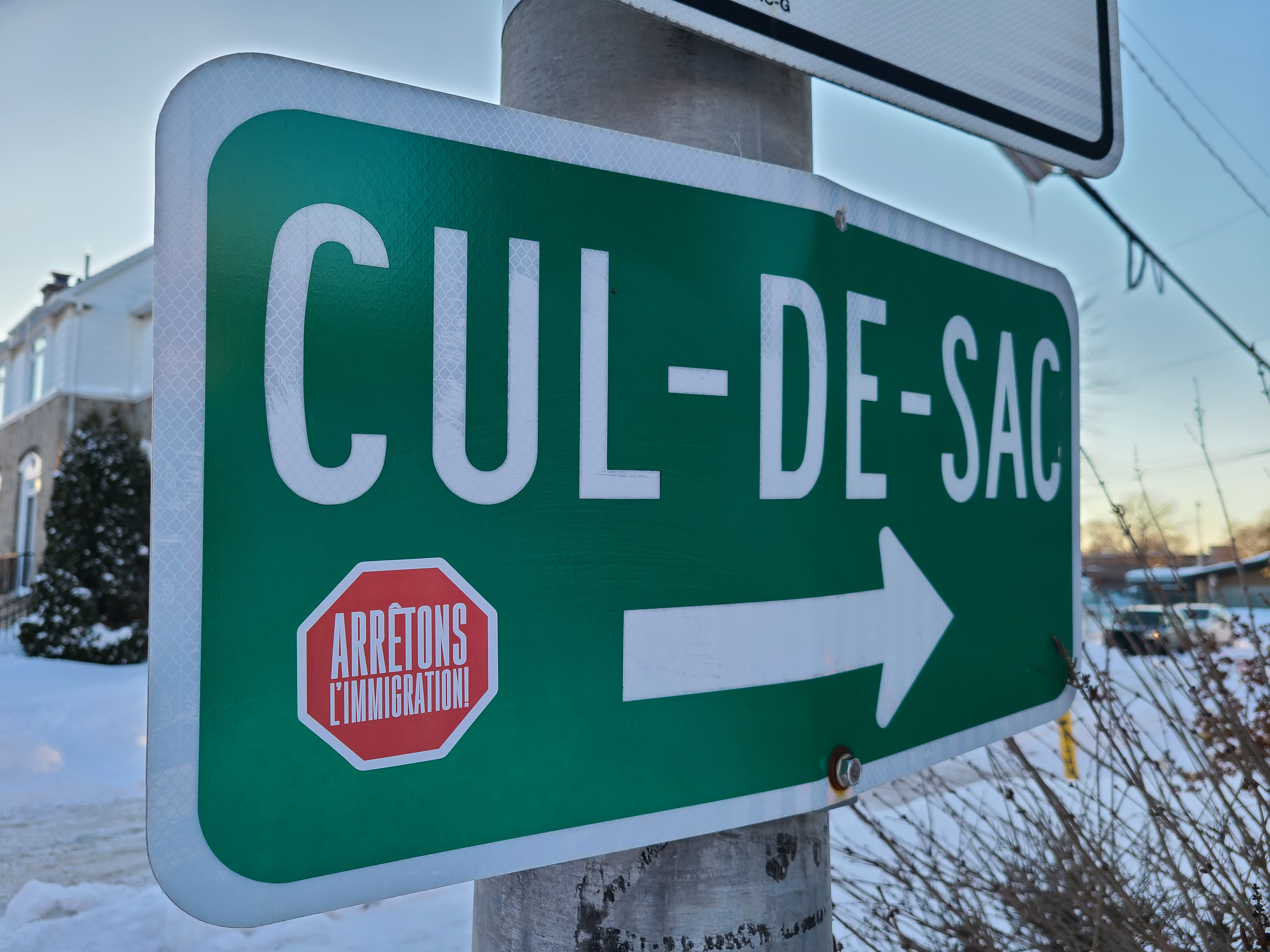
Stop immigration sticker on public roadsign (Montréal, 2021)

Opponents of immigration to Canada have argued that immigration to Canada is unsustainable and puts pressure on resources such as worsening the country's current housing crisis. They argue that Canadian cities are limited in size and cannot take an infinite number of people. This also further creates a competition for jobs and puts a strain on the economy, the environment and tax funded public services. Economic and housing resources seems to be the largest concern for Canadians, and recent studies show declining fear of immigrants threatening cultures or values.

Historically, Canada has implemented a variety of anti-immigration laws. In the early 19th century Canadian immigration laws specifically discriminated against people based on class, race, and disability. These policies continued into the 20th century, which did not change until following World War II.

In a 2013 interview with the French news magazine L'Express Canadian academic and environmental activist David Suzuki stated that Canada's immigration policy was "crazy" and "Canada is full". However, he insisted that Canada should "open its doors to those who are oppressed" and accept refugees. The leader of the far-right People's Party of Canada, Maxime Bernier believed that current immigration harms Canadian values, and also makes it more difficult for real refugees to come to Canada.

In a 2017 poll conducted by the Angus Reid Institute, a majority of respondents (57%) indicated that they believed Canada should accept fewer immigrants and refugees. Despite this more recent surveys immigration is one of the smallest concerns to the average Canadian, with only 2% of Canadian surveyed ranking immigration as their largest concern. Concerns for immigration seem to be directly tied to cost of living increases that the country has faced, with Canadians feeling housing costs are increasing due to immigration.

The National Citizens Alliance was a far-right political party in Canada that regularly held anti-immigration rallies.

The political parties Avenir Quebec, Bloc Québécois, People's party and factions of Conservative party have anti-immigration views, the former minister of foreign Affairs Maxime Bernier and some members of conservative party and regional conservative parties, such as Jason Kenney, François Legault, Scott Reid have anti-immigration views.

The Dominion Society of Canada is a Canadian political group that is against immigration.

In 2023, polls indicated that Canadians are increasingly concerned about the pressure high immigration is putting on housing, services and infrastructure. In October 2024, amid ongoing challenges related to the cost of living and housing affordability, and amidst increasing unpopularity of Prime Minister Justin Trudeau, the government announced reductions to immigration target levels.

==== Chile ====
In late 2025, President-elect José Antonio Kast made the mass deportation of undocumented migrants—the majority of whom are Venezuelan—a central pillar of his incoming administration.

==== Costa Rica ====
Anti-immigrant feelings date back to the late 19th century and early 20th century with the country's first waves of migrations from places like China, Lebanon and Poland. Non-Polish European migration dates back to practically the independence from Spain but was generally well received. Polish migration was mostly Jewish, thus the backlash was due to antisemitism. Records of the time show Chinese migrants as the most affected by prejudice, especially from government officials; the first anti-Chinese laws were enacted as far back as the 1910s. In 1903 President Ascensión Esquivel Ibarra enacted one of the first decrees forbidding non-White immigration and explicitly stating that migration from Asians, Blacks, Gypsies, Arabs and Turks was not allowed. However, these laws were common in Latin America at the time, and Costa Rica's government eventually became the lead force in its abolishment.

Polish, Chinese and Lebanese migrants would integrate fully into Costa Rican society with time to the point that many prominent Costa Ricans from industry, politics, arts, academy, etc. are of those descents. Latin American migrants became the next source of mistrust and opposition, especially Nicaraguan and Colombian migrants. During the second half of the 20th century and to this date Costa Rica receives numerous waves of Latin American migrants from all the region, but Nicaraguans are by far the higher group among immigrant population encompassing 74.6% of the immigrant population, followed by Colombians and Americans (immigrants in general are 9% of the population) making ethnic Nicaraguans and binational Nicaraguan-Costa Rican citizens one of the most notorious ethnic minorities in Costa Rica outnumbering other groups like African-Costa Ricans. This caused debate in the country with some voices claiming for harder regulations and border control. The issue was one of the main topics of the 2002 election and was again important for the 2018's campaign with right-wing politicians like Otto Guevara quoting Donald Trump as an inspiration and calling for harsher migratory laws and eliminating the citizenship by birth in the Constitution. The Migration Law was reformed in 2005, hardening some of the requirements for entering, staying and working in the country which were criticized as excessive, but further reforms—the last one in 2009—reduce some of the impact of the more controversial parts of the law. The far-right ultra-conservative National Restoration Party, which held an important role in the 2018 presidential election, also holds anti-migration positions.

After a series of fake news stories were spread by several far-right Facebook pages inciting hatred against Nicaraguan migrants, an anti-migration campaign was organized on 18 August 2018. It was known as the "Taken of La Merced", after Nicaraguan refugees were falsely accused of having taken over La Merced Park in San Jose, a common gathering site for the Nicaraguan community. Although some of the protesters were peaceful, the participation of openly neo-Nazi groups and violent hooligans with criminal records caused riots and attacks on Nicaraguans or people suspected of being Nicaraguan. The national police Public Force intervened, and up to 44 people were arrested—36 of whom were Costa Rican and the rest Nicaraguans. Several weapons including Molotov cocktails were confiscated. Some of the protesters identified themselves with swastikas and yelled "¡Fuera nicas!" ('Nicas out!'). A pro-immigrant protest occurred a week later, with high attendance. Further anti-migration protests were organized later (this time with the explicit exclusion of hooligans and neo-Nazis), but had lower participation.

==== Mexico ====
In Mexico, during the first eight months of 2005, more than 120,000 people from Central America were deported to their countries of origin. This is a much higher number than the people deported in the same period in 2002, when only 1 person was deported in the entire year. Many women from countries in the Commonwealth of Independent States (most of former USSR), Asia and Central and South America are offered jobs at table dance establishments in large cities throughout the country, causing the National Institute of Migration (INM) in Mexico to raid strip clubs and deport foreigners who work without the proper documentation.

Mexico has very strict laws pertaining to both illegal and legal immigrants. The Mexican constitution restricts non-citizens or foreign-born persons from participating in politics, holding office, acting as a member of the clergy, or serving on the crews of Mexican-flagged ships or airplanes. Certain legal rights are waived, such as the right to a deportation hearing or other legal motions. In cases of flagrante delicto, any person may make a citizen's arrest on the offender and his accomplices, turning them over without delay to the nearest authorities.

Many immigration restrictionists in the United States have accused the Mexican government of hypocrisy in its immigration policy, noting that while the Government of Mexico and Mexican Americans are demanding looser immigration laws in the United States and oppose the 2010 Arizona Immigration Bill, at the same time Mexico is imposing even tighter restrictions on immigration into Mexico from Central America and other places than the Arizona law. However, Mexico started enforcing those laws which they previously ignored at the direct request of the United States, which saw a surge of Central American immigration during the Bush years; the newly elected president of Mexico has stated his desire to be more open, and would not deport Central Americans on their way to the United States or those who wish to remain in Mexico.

==== Panama ====
The recent exodus of Venezuelan migrants in Panama encouraged the xenophobic and anti-migration public speech from Panamanian nationalist groups.

==== Peru ====
In November 2025, Peruvian President José Jerí declared a state of emergency along the southern border with Chile to block an influx of undocumented migrants, primarily Venezuelans. Large numbers of Venezuelans attempted to leave Chile and enter Peru following threats of mass expulsion from Chilean President-elect José Antonio Kast.

==== United States ====
"Stopping" people
you have nothing in common with

And if you don't stop people that you've never seen before, that you have nothing in common with, your country is going to fail. ... This double-tailed monster [of green energy and immigration] destroys everything in its wake, and they cannot let that happen any longer. You're doing it because you want to be nice, you want to be politically correct, and you're destroying your heritage.

— President Donald Trump
to the UN General Assembly,
23 September 2025

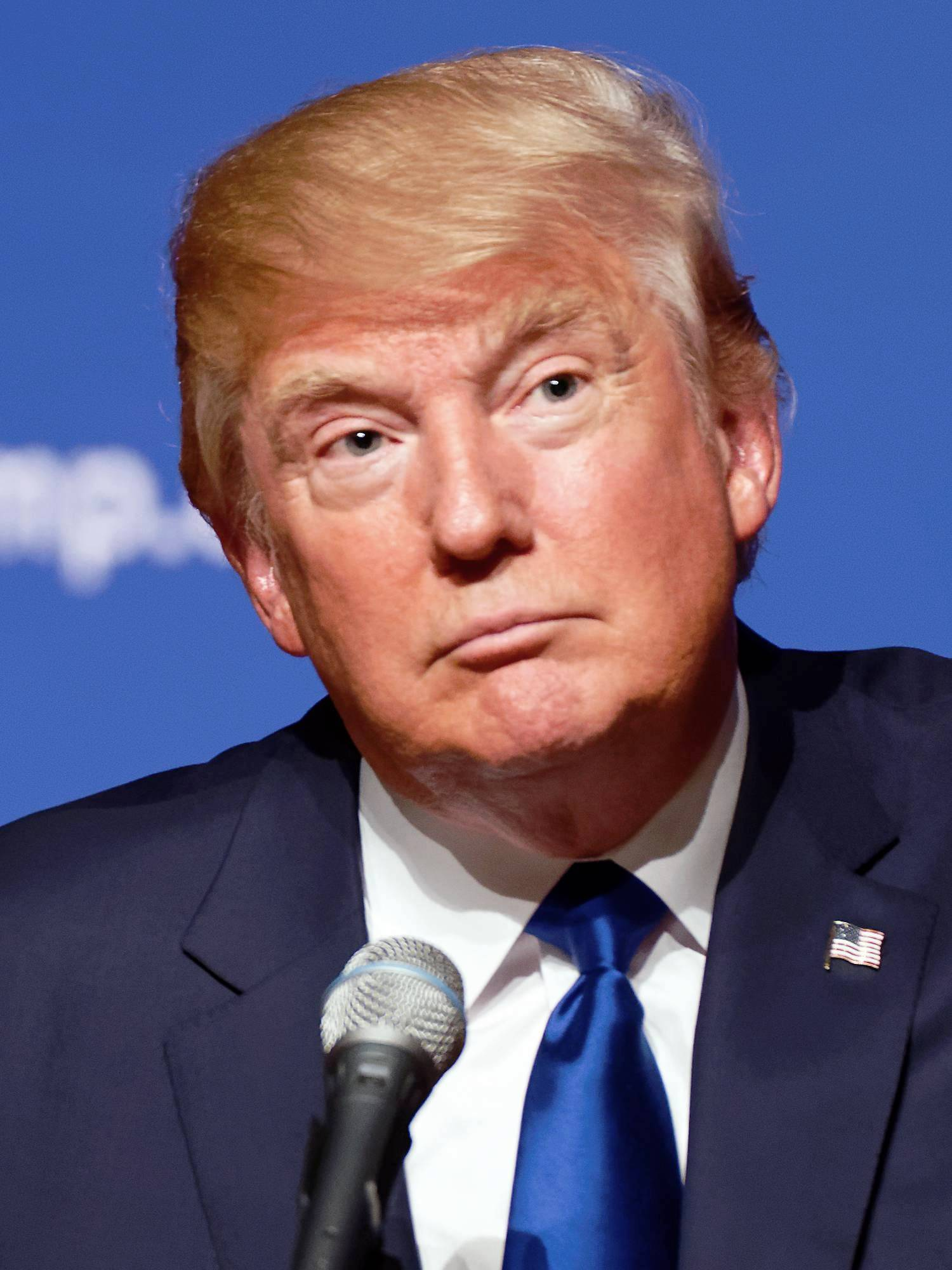
Donald Trump campaigned for president in 2016 by promising to build a wall on the border of Mexico and the United States "as the centerpiece of his immigration plan", as well as a temporary suspension of Muslim migration to the United States.

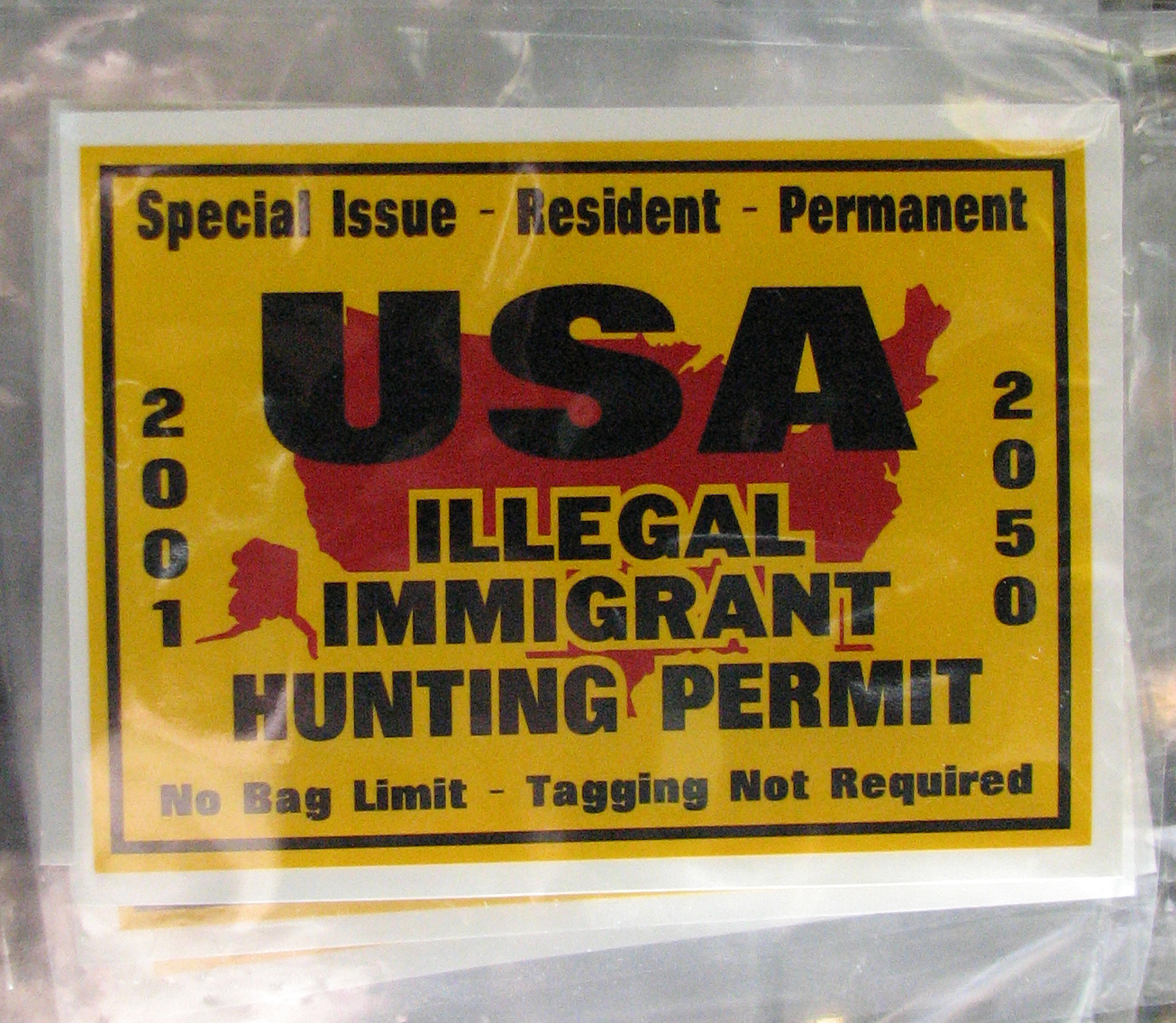
Anti-illegal immigrant car sticker in Colorado

In the United States, opponents of immigration typically focus on perceived adverse effects, such as economic costs (job competition and burdens on education and social services); negative environmental impact from accelerated population growth; increased crime rates, and in the long run, changes in traditional identities and values.

In countries where the majority of the population is of immigrant descent, such as the United States, opposition to immigration sometimes takes the form of nativism.

In the United States, opposition to immigration has a long history, starting in the late 1790s, in reaction to an influx of political refugees from France and Ireland. The Alien and Sedition Acts of 1798 severely restricted the rights of immigrants. Nativism first gained a name and affected politics in the mid-19th century United States because of the large inflows of immigrants from cultures that were markedly different from the existing Protestant culture. Nativists primarily objected to Roman Catholics, especially Irish Americans. Nativist movements included the American Party of the mid-19th Century (formed by members of the Know-Nothing movement), the Immigration Restriction League of the early 20th Century, and the anti-Asian movements in the West, resulting in the Chinese Exclusion Act and the so-called "Gentlemen's Agreement" which was aimed at the Japanese. Major restrictions became law in the 1920s and sharply cut the inflow of immigrants until 1965, when they ended. The federal government took charge of finding and deporting illegal aliens, which it still does.

Immigration again became a major issue from the 1990s onward, with burgeoning rates of undocumented immigration, particularly by Mexicans who crossed the southern border, and others who overstayed their visitor visas. The Immigration Reform and Control Act of 1986 provided an amnesty which was described as the amnesty to end all amnesties but it had no lasting impact on the flow of illegal immigrants.

By 2014, the Tea Party movement narrowed its focus away from economic issues, spending and Obamacare to attacking President Barack Obama's immigration policies. They saw his immigration policies as threatening to transform American society. They tried but failed to defeat leading Republicans who supported immigration programs, such as Senator John McCain. A typical slogan appeared in the Tea Party Tribune: "Amnesty for Millions, Tyranny for All." The New York Times reported:

What started five years ago as a groundswell of conservatives committed to curtailing the reach of the federal government, cutting the deficit and countering the Wall Street wing of the Republican Party has become a movement largely against immigration overhaul. The politicians, intellectual leaders and activists who consider themselves part of the Tea Party movement have redirected their energy from fiscal austerity and small government to stopping any changes that would legitimize people who are here illegally, either through granting them citizenship or legal status.

As of 2014, over 42.4 million immigrants were living in the United States. This was about 13.3% of the entire United States population at that time.

In 2016, New York City millionaire and media personality, Donald Trump, ran a successful presidential campaign aimed at ending illegal immigration. Trump portrayed himself as the outsider who would "Make America Great Again," calling out to the Tea Party movement and the like who wanted to "take their country back." Several of his campaign promises included construction of a border wall along the US–Mexico border, a temporary suspension of migration to the United States from several Muslim-majority nations, and the deportation of undocumented immigrants. Trump was known for his "Make America Great Again" rhetoric which could become provocative, inciting violence at his campaign rallies. A major part of his 2016 campaign was opposition to "political correctness", which he criticized as too nice, when we need to be stronger and tougher. Although Trump's Democratic rival Hillary Clinton, and even some of his fellow Republicans, such as John McCain and Mitt Romney, called Trump's "Make America Great Again"/anti-immigrant rhetoric racist, xenophobic, Islamophobic, and dangerous, but his proposals found strong support in the heartland and the south.

On 8 November 2016, Trump won as the 2016 US presidential election against his Democratic rival Hillary Clinton. Although Clinton won the popular vote, Trump won the electoral college.

Trump was later inaugurated on 20 January 2017. After taking the oath of office, Trump gave a speech that lacked any of the incendiary rhetoric many people had grown accustomed to, such as when he argued that prejudice is inconsistent with patriotism – though many still viewed his speech as divisive. He tried to strike a balance between rallying his supporters and uniting the country. The speech seemingly called out previous US politicians, including the former presidents sitting next to him, as being ineffective and inadequate at leading most Americans. It also echoed much of the same isolationist and nativist rhetoric that his campaign had inspired, in which Trump related his election to that of a revolution in the country, promising to take the country back. Nationalism ran high, with Trump stating that America would come first in every situation from that moment forward, and in the finale he repeated his longstanding campaign promise to Make America Great Again.

Promptly after his inauguration, Trump issued an executive order to begin construction of a border wall along the US-Mexico border and limit the number of refugees and foreigners entering the country. Then on 27 January 2017, he issued an executive order banning the admission of travelers from seven Muslim-majority nations, which was met with large protests at airports all over the nation. The order would not only shut down the U.S. Refugee Admissions Program for 120 days but also suspend entry from seven countries for 90 days. Since the countries subject to the ban were Iran, Iraq, Libya, Somalia, Sudan, Syria, and Yemen, Trump's travel ban was referred to by critics and supporters alike as “the Muslim ban.” After the original executive order, there were two more modified versions of the travel ban, which were all met with polarized reactions from politicians and the general public alike.

Later on in his presidency, in April 2018, the Trump administration’s zero-tolerance family separation policy saw migrant children taken from their parents, until it was suspended in response to public opposition on 20 June 2018. But immigration became the focus again in the lead-up to the midterm elections when President Trump sent troops to the border to meet a migrant caravan. Tensions came to a head on 25 November 2018, when border agents fired tear gas after migrants rushed barriers. Tear gas has been used at the border since 2010, but critics called its use on a desperate group with small children overkill. In one of the more surreal moments of 2018, the President at first denied that children had been gassed, despite plenty of photos. This was also met with large nationwide protests and polarized reactions from politicians and the general public alike.

Labor unions

The American Federation of Labor (AFL), a coalition of labor unions formed in the 1880s, vigorously opposed unrestricted immigration from Europe for moral, cultural, and racial reasons. The issue unified the workers who feared that an influx of new workers would flood the labor market and lower wages. Nativism was not a factor because upwards of half the union members were themselves immigrants or the sons of immigrants from Ireland, Germany and Britain. However, nativism was a factor when the AFL even more strenuously opposed all immigration from Asia because it represented (to its Euro-American members) an alien culture that could not be assimilated into American society. The AFL intensified its opposition after 1906 and was instrumental in passing immigration restriction bills from the 1890s to the 1920s, such as the 1921 Emergency Quota Act and the Immigration Act of 1924 and seeing that they were strictly enforced.

Mink (1986) concludes that the link between the AFL and the Democratic Party rested in part on immigration issues, noting the large corporations, which supported the Republicans, wanted more immigration to augment their labor force.

The United Farm Workers was committed to restricting immigration during Cesar Chavez tenure. Chavez and Dolores Huerta, cofounder and president of the UFW, fought the Bracero Program that existed from 1942 to 1964. Their opposition stemmed from their belief that the program undermined U.S. workers and exploited the migrant workers. Since the Bracero Program ensured a constant supply of cheap immigrant labor for growers, immigrants could not protest any infringement of their rights, lest they be fired and replaced. Their efforts contributed to Congress ending the Bracero Program in 1964. In 1973, the UFW was one of the first labor unions to oppose proposed employer sanctions that would have prohibited hiring illegal immigrants.

On a few occasions, concerns that illegal immigrant labor would undermine UFW strike campaigns led to a number of controversial events, which the UFW describes as anti-strikebreaking events, but which have also been interpreted as being anti-immigrant. In 1969, Chavez and members of the UFW marched through the Imperial and Coachella Valleys to the border of Mexico to protest growers' use of illegal immigrants as strikebreakers. Joining him on the march were Reverend Ralph Abernathy and U.S. Senator Walter Mondale. In its early years, the UFW and Chavez went so far as to report illegal immigrants who served as strikebreaking replacement workers (as well as those who refused to unionize) to the Immigration and Naturalization Service.

In 1973, the United Farm Workers set up a "wet line" along the United States-Mexico border to prevent Mexican immigrants from entering the United States illegally and potentially undermining the UFW's unionization efforts. During one such event, in which Chavez was not involved, some UFW members, under the guidance of Chavez's cousin Manuel, physically attacked the strikebreakers after peaceful attempts to persuade them not to cross the border failed.

In 1979, Chavez used a forum of a U.S. Senate committee hearing to denounce the federal immigration service, which he said the U.S. Immigration and Naturalization Service purportedly refused to arrest illegal Mexican immigrants who Chavez claims are being used to break the union's strike.

Bernie Sanders opposes guest worker programs and he is also skeptical of skilled immigrant (H-1B) visas, saying, "Last year, the top 10 employers of H-1B guest workers were all offshore outsourcing companies. These firms are responsible for shipping large numbers of American information technology jobs to India and other countries". In an interview with Vox, he stated his opposition to an open borders immigration policy, describing it as such:

[A] right-wing proposal, which says essentially there is no United States. [...] [Y]ou're doing away with the concept of a nation-state. What right-wing people in this country would love is an open-border policy. Bring in all kinds of people, work for $2 or $3 an hour, that would be great for them. I don't believe in that. I think we have to raise wages in this country, I think we have to do everything we can to create millions of jobs.

=== Africa ===
==== South Africa ====
Several periods of violent riots against migrants have occurred in South Africa in the past decade, some resulting in fatalities. Countries from which the migrants targeted originated include Malawi, Mozambique and Zimbabwe.

In March 2019, groups armed with machetes broke into the homes of migrants in Durban. At least six people were killed, several were wounded, and their homes were looted. At least 300 Malawi migrants were forced to leave the country. In separate attacks, foreign truck drivers were forced out of their vehicles and were attacked with knives. On 2 April 2019, another group of migrants in Durban was attacked and forced to flee their homes. The escalating violence added tension to the 2019 South African general election.

Operation Dudula is a political organization described as xenophobic and linked to violent targeting of immigrants.

== Effects of anti-immigration policies ==
Anti-immigrant policies can affect law and order, social security, and international relations as well as inequality issues.

== See also ==
- America First (policy)
- Aporophobia
- Aussie (poster) – Australian poster series by Peter Drew
- Economic migrant
- Economic results of migration
- Environmental migrant
- Environmental racism
- Ethnic competition thesis
- Executive Order 13769
- Global labor arbitrage
- Haijin and Sakoku
- Human capital flight
- Human overpopulation
- Immigration and crime
- Immigration policy
- Immigration reduction in the United States
- Immigration reform
- International Organization for Migration
- Islamization and Islamophobia
- Left-wing terrorism
- Make America Great Again
- Nativism (politics)
- Non-refoulement
- People smuggling
- Political asylum
- Right of foreigners to vote
- Right-wing terrorism
- Rivers of Blood speech
- Single-issue politics
- Tourismphobia
- Trump administration family separation policy
- Trumpism
- With Open Gates
- Xenophobia

== Sources ==
- Alexseev, Mikhail A. (2006). Immigration phobia and the security dilemma: Russia, Europe, and the United States. Cambridge New York: Cambridge University Press. ISBN 9780521849883.
- Jensen, Richard (Spring 2009). "Comparative nativism: the United States, Canada and Australia, 1880s–1910s". Canadian Issues. Association for Canadian Studies: 45–55. Archived from the original on 3 July 2017.
- Peter Thisted Dinesen and Frederick Hjorth. 2020. "Attitudes toward Immigration: Theories, Settings, and Approaches." in The Oxford Handbook of Behavioral Political Science.

United States

- Allerfeldt, Kristofer (2003). Race, radicalism, religion, and restriction immigration in the Pacific Northwest, 1890–1924. Westport, Connecticut: Praeger. ISBN 9780313093036.
- Anbinder, Tyler (2006), "Nativism and prejudice against immigrants", in Ueda, Reed (ed.), A companion to American immigration, Malden, Massachusetts Oxford: Blackwell Publishing, pp. 177–201, ISBN 9780631228431. Excerpt.
- Barkan, Elliott R. (Summer 2003). "Return of the nativists? California public opinion and immigration in the 1980s and 1990s". Social Science History. 27 (2). Cambridge Journals: 229–283. doi:10.1017/S0145553200012530. JSTOR 40267808. S2CID 144785379.
- Higham, John (1963). Strangers in the land: patterns of American nativism, 1860–1925. New York: Atheneum. OCLC 421752.
- Hueston, Robert F. (1976). The Catholic press and nativism, 1840–1860. New York: Arno Press. ISBN 9780405093425.
- Maddalena, Marinari. Unwanted: Italian and Jewish Mobilization against Restrictive Immigration Laws, 1882–1965 (2020) excerpt
- Schrag, Peter (2010). Not fit for our society nativism and immigration. Berkeley: University of California Press. ISBN 9780520259782.

Canada

- McLean, Lorna (Summer 2004). ""To become part of us": ethnicity, race, literacy and the Canadian Immigration Act of 1919". Canadian Ethnic Studies. 36 (2): 1–28. ISSN 0008-3496. Archived from the original on 24 June 2019 – via Questia.
- Palmer, Howard (1982). Patterns of prejudice: a history of nativism in Alberta. Toronto, Ontario: McClelland and Stewart. ISBN 9780771069475.
- Robin, Martin (1992). Shades of right: nativist and fascist politics in Canada, 1920–1940. Toronto Buffalo: University of Toronto Press. ISBN 9780802068927.
- Ward, W. Peter (2002) [1978]. White Canada forever popular attitudes and public policy toward orientals in British Columbia (3rd ed.). Montreal, Quebec: McGill-Queen's University Press. ISBN 9780773569935.

Other countries

- Betz, Hans-Georg (2007), "Against the 'Green Totalitarianism': Anti-Islamic nativism in contemporary radical right-wing populism in Western Europe", in Schori Liang, Christina (ed.), Europe for the Europeans the foreign and security policy of the populist radical right, Aldershot, England Burlington, Vermont: Ashgate, pp. 33–54, ISBN 9780754686255.
- Finzsch, Norbert; Schirmer, Dietmar, eds. (1998). Identity and intolerance : nationalism, racism, and xenophobia in Germany and the United States. Washington, D.C. Cambridge: German Historical Institute Cambridge University Press. ISBN 9780521591584.
- Lucassen, Leo (2005). The immigrant threat: the integration of old and new migrants in western Europe since 1850. Urbana, Illinois: University of Illinois Press. ISBN 9780252072949. Examines Irish immigrants in Britain, Polish immigrants in Germany, Italian immigrants in France (before 1940), and (since 1950), Caribbeans in Britain, Turks in Germany, and Algerians in France.
- Schori Liang, Christina, ed. (2007). Europe for the Europeans the foreign and security policy of the populist radical right. Aldershot, England Burlington, Vermont: Ashgate. ISBN 9780754686255.
