= Immigration Control Platform =

Defunct Irish political party

- Chairperson: Áine Ní Chonaill
- Secretary: Gerry Kinneavy
- Founder: Áine Ní Chonaill
- Founded: 13 January 1998
- Dissolved: October 2022
- Ideology: Anti-immigration; Euroscepticism
- Political position: Far-right

Immigration Control Platform (ICP) (Irish: An Feachtas um Smacht ar Inimirce) was a political group which sought to restrict immigration to Ireland. The organisation's website described it as an "Irish NGO" funded by subscriptions and donations. It was not registered in Ireland as a political party, but between 2002 and 2011 it ran non-party candidates in elections, with their election material displaying the Immigration Control Platform branding.

== Positions and organisation ==
The ICP did not apply for political party status, although it was registered as a "Third Party" by the Standards in Public Office Commission Its website described it as a "voluntary organisation" for which:

- "The aim of the organisation is to address the phenomenon of immigration to Ireland and to lobby Government for a tight immigration policy",
- "The organisation aims at a very rigorous policy in relation to asylum-seekers, refugees, and a determined response to all illegal immigration", and that,
- "No one who holds views of racial superiority is welcome in the group."

ICP's main activities were writing letters to newspapers, issuing press releases, and maintaining a website. It also issued leaflets and occasionally held small protests and pickets. It had an executive committee elected by its membership at an annual meeting. It claimed to be funded by membership fees and private donations. Its leaders described it as a single-issue group. Historian Judith Pryor interpreted its policy as favouring white immigrants over non-whites. ICP denied being racist.

ICP had no policy on Irish illegal immigration to the United States, an issue sometimes linked with immigration to Ireland. ICP candidate Ted Neville had himself spent time illegally in the United States.

== History ==
ICP's most prominent member was Áine Ní Chonaill, whose official title was public relations officer. A schoolteacher from Clonakilty, she stood in Cork South-West in the 1997 general election as an independent on an anti-immigration platform, winning 0.84% of the first-preference vote. The election came early in the Celtic Tiger economic boom and an increase in asylum seekers from Eastern Europe and further afield. ICP was founded at a meeting organised by Ní Chonaill in Ennis on 13 January 1998. The meeting was disrupted by anti-racism activists, and the venues of later ICP conferences were not disclosed in advance.

In 1999 ICP did not run any candidates in that year's European Parliament elections, however the group campaigned against Proinsias De Rossa of the Labour Party, claiming it would be disastrous for Ireland if he was elected to the European Parliament because of his pro-immigrant views. De Rossa's candidacy was successful despite the ICP's efforts.

In 2002 the leader of the far-right British National Party Nick Griffin encouraged Irish voters to support Immigration Control Platform and offered financial aid to the organisation.

Journalist Harry McGee in 2003 described Irish media coverage of ICP as disproportionate to its small size and generally hostile to its views. ICP has refused to tell the media or Oireachtas how many members it has.

In 2003 Ní Chonaill along with then-chairman John Oakes attended a discussion on immigration at the Oireachtas Joint Committee on Justice, Equality, Defence and Women's Rights. Ní Chonaill felt that a January 2003 Supreme Court decision, which permitted deportation of illegal immigrants with Irish-born children, did not go far enough. ICP supported the successful 2004 referendum which restricted citizenship by birth, a practice ICP said encouraged birth tourism by pregnant illegal immigrants.

After 2011, ICP stopped running candidates in general elections and refocused the organisation as an "NGO".

Ní Chonaill and Ted Neville of ICP spoke at the Oireachtas Committee on Justice, Defence and Equality on 1 April 2015. During that meeting Anne Ferris was made to withdraw a comment comparing ICP's views to Nazism.

The organisation was wound up at its 2022 AGM.

== Legacy ==
The ICP was among the earliest organisations in Ireland to campaign directly on a platform to halt immigration. Some former ICP members and candidates later joined and stood as candidates for far-right parties in the 2010s and 2020s.

Former ICP candidate Ted Neville stood for the National Party in the 2024 general election in Cork South-Central. Former ICP secretary Gerry Kinneavy was selected as National Party deputy leader in January 2026. Former ICP chairman John Oakes stood for the Irish Freedom Party in Dublin Fingal East in the 2024 general election. In the 2009 Dublin Central by-election, ICP fielded Pat Talbot, whose campaign was managed by the later national organiser of the National Party.

== Elections ==
ICP candidates in elections
Date	Candidate	Election	Constituency	1st-pref % (Note: Percentage of valid first-preference votes cast for the candidate.)	Refs
2002	Áine Ní Chonaill	General	Dublin South-Central	2.1	
2002	Ted Neville	General	Cork South-Central	0.67	
2004	Pat Talbot	Local	Dublin City Council, Cabra	1.65	
2004	Ted Neville	Local	Cork City Council, South Central	1.44	
2007	Pat Talbot	General	Dublin Central	0.69	
2007	John Donnelly	General	Dublin North	0.52	
2007	Ted Neville	General	Cork South-Central	1.36	
2009	Pat Talbot	By-election	Dublin Central	2.16	
2011	Ted Neville (Note: Neville stood in 2011 under the label of "Irish Solidarity Party" (which is not a registered party).)	General	Cork South-Central	0.82	

== General election results ==
Election	Seats won	±	Position	First Pref votes	%	Government	Leader
2007	0 / 166	0	12	1,329	0.06	No seats	Áine Ní Chonaill

== See also ==
- Identity Ireland
- Pegida Ireland
- National Party (Ireland)
