= Áine Ní Chonaill =

Irish activist

- Born: Cork, Ireland
- Education: University College Cork
- Organization: Immigration Control Platform

Áine Ní Chonaill is an Irish anti-immigration activist who is the founder and public relations officer of the Immigration Control Platform (ICP).

== Biography ==
Ní Chonaill was born in Cork and studied at University College Cork. She became a school teacher in County Cork, before becoming the public relations officer the Immigration Control Platform (ICP). Her political background is largely unknown, but she was involved in the early days of the Progressive Democrats. In 1998 she described herself as a Europhobe and a libertarian, stating "I'm the kind of person who doesn't believe in interfering with people's liberties. I won't wear a seat belt and I won't pay the fines for not wearing one. It's not the law's business to stop me going through the windscreen."

== Career ==
At the 1997 general election, Ní Chonaill stood in her native Cork South-West constituency, she received 293 votes. Ní Chonaill said she started her campaign because she was concerned about the numbers of immigrants arriving in Ireland and about asylum abuse. In 1998 she was the main founder of Immigration Control Platform, an anti-immigration organisation frequently described as far-right.

She stood for election again in the larger Dublin South-Central constituency at the 2002 general election, where she received 926 votes.

In 2005, Ní Chonaill was accused of being a neo-Nazi after being invited to UCD's Literary and Historical Society for a debate. She was later asked to not attend the UCD event, Ní Chonaill later denied the claim.

== Views ==
Ní Chonaill has, as spokesperson, repeatedly spoken out about immigration, including opposing the Charter of Fundamental Rights and asylum claims of homosexuals fleeing persecution. In a statement she said: "If the choice is between having homosexuals from these countries having to act discreetly and us being swamped with alleged homosexual claims from 80 countries around the world then they will just have to act discreetly".

She has described the Irish government's response to the 1990 Fajujonu court case, as a betrayal of Irish citizens.
