= Identity Ireland =

Defunct Irish political party

Identity Ireland Aitheantas Éire
- Leader: Peter O'Loughlin
- Founded: 22 July 2015
- Dissolved: c. January 2023
- Ideology: Anti-immigration; Anti-Islam; Identitarianism; Irish nationalism Right-wing populism Hard Euroscepticism
- Political position: Right-wing to far-right
- Colours: Blue

Identity Ireland (Irish: Aitheantas Éire) was a minor anti-immigration political party in Ireland. A right-wing to far-right party, it never achieved electoral representation at local or national level. It was launched in Dublin on 22 July 2015. Its founders were Gary Allen, Peter O'Loughlin and Alan Tighe. O'Loughlin, the party's national spokesperson, contested the 2016 Irish general election and 2019 European Parliament election. As of 2023, the party was defunct.

== Policy ==
Identity Ireland favoured Irish sovereignty by leaving the European Union and a return to the Irish pound. The party supported a controlled border policy in order to curtail the immigration that, it said, was putting strain on the Irish welfare system. It also supported more careful vetting of incoming asylum seekers. It supported the Irish branch of Pegida, and joined the Fortress Europe coalition. It advocated the introduction of a two-strike law for serious offences, as well as the re-introduction of penal labour. It supported keeping Ireland's neutrality. It also advocated in favour of Brexit.

== Elections ==
Before founding Identity Ireland, Peter O'Loughlin unsuccessfully contested the 2014 European Parliament election for the South constituency, with 1.0% of the first preference votes. He also unsuccessfully contested the 2015 Carlow-Kilkenny by-election, receiving 1.4% (930) of the first preference votes.

O'Loughlin also ran in the 2016 Irish general election in the Cork North-Central constituency as an independent, where he came last with only 0.36% (183) of first preference votes. O'Loughlin later contested the 2019 European Parliament election in Ireland, receiving 0.5% (3,682) of first preference votes in the Ireland South constituency.

Another party member, Ted Neville, was unsuccessful as an independent candidate in four previous elections in the Cork South-Central constituency. He has appeared on television to discuss immigration, both as a member of Identity Ireland and as a member of the Immigration Control Platform group.

== Status ==
As of 14 May 2018, Identity Ireland was recorded in the Oireachtas Register of Political Parties, though as an organisation that had "not yet responded to commission's enquiries" by the Standards in Public Office Commission (SIPO).

In 2017, SIPO stated that no statements of accounts had been received from Identity Ireland, in breach of the Electoral Act. In November 2020, SIPO announced that Identity Ireland were one of five political parties who failed to provide them with a set of audited accounts for 2019, in breach of statutory obligations.

In July 2022, the Gardaí announced that Identity Ireland chairman Peter O'Loughlin was missing from his home in Cork. Renewing their appeal for information in tracing his whereabouts in early August 2022, the Gardaí and O'Loughlin's family stated that they were "concerned for his welfare". O'Loughlin was found safe and well in October 2022.

As of January 2023, the party was no longer included on the Dáil register of political parties. The party's website has not been updated since 2016. Its social media presence was erased in approximately late 2022/early 2023.

== Reception ==
Identity Ireland was often accused of being racist. Some of its press conferences and meetings, and its launch, were disrupted by protesters.

The day after its launch the party claimed that membership increased by 25%, and that before the launch it had 115 members. Party leader Peter O'Loughlin was invited to speak at the first Pegida rally of 2016 in Dresden, Germany. In January 2016, the party was criticized for suggesting a local Muslim community leader be thrown into the Irish Sea. A spokesperson for Identity Ireland subsequently stated that it did not intend to advocate violence, and that the phrase "fuck him into the Irish sea" was intended as a euphemism.

== Election results ==
=== European Parliament ===
Election year	# of total votes	% of overall vote	# of seats won
2019	3,685	0.2%	0 / 12

== See also ==
- Irish Freedom Party
- National Party (Ireland)
- Immigration Control Platform
