= 1999 Dún Laoghaire–Rathdown County Council election =

Part of the 1999 Irish local elections

← 1991	10 June 1999	2004 →

All 28 seats to Dún Laoghaire–Rathdown County Council
	First party	Second party	Third party
Party	Fianna Fáil	Fine Gael	Labour
Seats won	10	8	6
Seat change	+2	+1	+1
	Fourth party	Fifth party	Sixth party
Party	Progressive Democrats	Green	Workers' Party
Seats won	3	1	0
Seat change	+1	-2	-3
- Map showing the area of Dún Laoghaire–Rathdown County Council
Council control after election
TBD

An election to Dún Laoghaire–Rathdown County Council took place on 10 June 1999 as part of that year's Irish local elections. 28 councillors were elected from six local electoral areas on the system of proportional representation by means of the single transferable vote (PR-STV) for a five-year term of office.

== Results by party ==
Party	Seats	±	First Pref. votes	FPv%	±%
Fianna Fáil	10	+2	18,108	31.58	
Fine Gael	8	+1	15,662	27.31	
Labour	6	+1	10,370	18.08	
Progressive Democrats	3	+1	4,576	7.98	
Green	1	-2	4,208	7.34	
Workers' Party	0	-3	N/A	N/A	
Totals	28	0	57,348	100.00	—

== Results by local electoral area ==
=== Ballybrack ===
Ballybrack - 6 seats
Party	Candidate	FPv%	Count							
Party	Candidate	FPv%	1	2	3	4	5	6	7	8
Fianna Fáil	Larry Butler*	17.47	1,974							
Fine Gael	Donal Marren*	14.26	1,611							
Labour	Denis O'Callaghan*	10.28	1,161	1,182	1,223	1,283	1,284	1,311	1,409	1,472
Fine Gael	Eoin Costello	9.80	1,107	1,146	1,157	1,196	1,199	1,470	1,507	1,668
Labour	Frank Smyth*	9.41	1,063	1,072	1,114	1,128	1,128	1,179	1,308	1,434
Fianna Fáil	Bernie Lowe	7.72	872	1,041	1,059	1,101	1,102	1,214	1,317	1,579
Green	Catherine Sweeney	7.55	853	867	909	948	948	1,070	1,233	1,367
Independent	Larry Lohan*	6.39	722	764	779	806	808	881	927	
Progressive Democrats	Feilim Clear	6.26	707	736	744	764	765			
Sinn Féin	Mick Nolan	6.17	697	706	746	765	767	791		
Independent	John Kavanagh	2.44	276	282	300					
Socialist Workers	David O'Sullivan	1.37	155	156						
Independent	Tom Mason	0.89	100	101						
Electorate: 31,527 Valid: 11,298 (35.84%) Spoilt: 145 Quota: 1,615 Turnout: 11,443 (36.30%)

=== Blackrock ===
Blackrock - 4 seats
Party	Candidate	FPv%	Count							
Party	Candidate	FPv%	1	2	3	4	5	6	7	8
Fianna Fáil	Barry Andrews	20.75	1,791							
Labour	Niamh Bhreathnach	19.37	1,672	1,683	1,692	1,854				
Fine Gael	William Dockrell*	12.76	1,101	1,104	1,110	1,156	1,171	1,236	1,349	1,584
Fine Gael	Mary Brophy	10.02	865	869	872	917	928	987	1,118	1,311
Progressive Democrats	Victor Boyhan	8.84	763	768	782	809	823	939	1,137	1,316
Fianna Fáil	Barry Conway	8.20	708	743	751	788	794	853		
Green	Anne Brogan-Young	7.16	618	620	650	686	699			
Labour	Marian White	6.16	532	534	543	650	718	951	1,034	
Labour	Seán Misteil*	5.49	474	476	485					
Independent	Bill Stack	1.23	106	106						
Electorate: 22,155 Valid: 8,630 (38.95%) Spoilt: 110 Quota: 1,727 Turnout: 8,740 (39.45%)

=== Dundrum ===
Dundrum - 6 seats
Party	Candidate	FPv%	Count									
Party	Candidate	FPv%	1	2	3	4	5	6	7	8	9	10
Fianna Fáil	Tony Fox*	21.67	2,828									
Fine Gael	Mary Elliott*	14.13	1,844	1,938								
Fine Gael	Pat Hand*	10.04	1,310	1,384	1,408	1,807	1,937					
Fianna Fáil	Trevor Matthews*	9.36	1,221	1,513	1,522	1,535	1,565	1,633	1,789	1,804	2,039	
Labour	Aidan Culhane	8.57	1,118	1,172	1,190	1,197	1,234	1,269	1,423	1,437	1,525	1,612
Fianna Fáil	Tony Kelly	8.49	1,108	1,267	1,279	1,283	1,307	1,358	1,450	1,461	2,050	
Fianna Fáil	David Boylan*	6.58	859	1,029	1,040	1,049	1,062	1,116	1,176	1,186		
Green	Dominic Leonard	6.08	794	828	867	871	892	1,019	1,200	1,222	1,285	1,381
Progressive Democrats	John Smyth	5.13	670	697	712	715	755	808				
Fine Gael	Michael O'Driscoll	4.33	565	581	588	598						
Independent	Richard Greene*	3.88	506	541	615	620	647					
Independent	Shane Egan	1.75	228	236								
Electorate: 32,716 Valid: 13,051 (39.89%) Spoilt: 150 Quota: 1,865 Turnout: 13,201 (40.35%)

=== Dún Laoghaire ===
Dún Laoghaire - 6 seats
Party	Candidate	FPv%	Count							
Party	Candidate	FPv%	1	2	3	4	5	6	7	8
Labour	Eamon Gilmore TD*	19.59	2,490							
Fianna Fáil	Betty Coffey*	17.21	2,187							
Fine Gael	Senator Liam T. Cosgrave*	14.89	1,893							
Progressive Democrats	Senator Helen Keogh*	12.04	1,530	1,621	1,672	1,681	1,787	1,843		
Green	Vincent MacDowell	8.80	1,119	1,205	1,223	1,225	1,253	1,296	1,516	1,594
Fine Gael	Barbara Robinson-Smyth	8.08	1,027	1,067	1,084	1,103	1,318	1,335	1,501	1,514
Labour	Jane Dillon-Byrne*	7.10	902	1,256	1,295	1,300	1,374	1,409	1,613	1,619
Fianna Fáil	Eimear McAuliffe	6.13	779	817	896	899	928	1,257		
Fine Gael	Barbara Culleton	3.23	410	453	475	512				
Fianna Fáil	Peter Lawlor	2.93	373	395	540	542	560			
Electorate: 34,117 Valid: 12,710 (37.25%) Spoilt: 120 Quota: 1,816 Turnout: 12,928 (37.89%)

=== Glencullen ===
Glencullen - 3 seats
Party	Candidate	FPv%	Count				
Party	Candidate	FPv%	1	2	3	4	5
Fine Gael	Olivia Mitchell TD*	35.67	1,752				
Fianna Fáil	Jimmy Murphy	20.72	1,018	1,075	1,118	1,151	1,220
Fianna Fáil	Maria Corrigan	19.85	975	1,080	1,115	1,197	1,330
Labour	Pat Fitzgerald*	7.55	371	425	450	590	
Green	Tara Skakie	7.23	355	395	433		
Fine Gael	Hugh Walsh	5.48	269	517	545	634	877
Independent	Peter Doyle	3.50	172	191			
Electorate: 14,466 Valid: 4,912 (33.96%) Spoilt: 57 Quota: 1,229 Turnout: 4,969 (34.35%)

=== Stillorgan ===
Stillorgan - 3 seats
Party	Candidate	FPv%	Count						
Party	Candidate	FPv%	1	2	3	4	5	6	7
Fine Gael	Louise Cosgrave	17.03	1,149	1,200	1,255	1,345	1,548	2,106	
Progressive Democrats	Fiona O'Malley	13.43	906	960	1,021	1,113	1,264	1,395	1,650
Independent	Gearóid O'Keeffe	12.81	864	925	973	1,130	1,287	1,382	1,494
Fianna Fáil	Senator Don Lydon*	11.58	781	806	1,153	1,319	1,373	1,496	1,548
Fine Gael	Donal Lowry*	11.25	759	787	818	895	993		
Fianna Fáil	Gerry Horkan	9.40	634	656					
Independent	Richard Greene*	8.86	598	679	717				
Labour	Margaret McCluskey	8.70	587	695	733	785			
Green	Larry Gordon*	6.95	469						
Electorate: 15,698 Valid: 6,747 (42.98%) Spoilt: 75 Quota: 1,687 Turnout: 6,822 (43.46%)

Preceded by 1991 Dún Laoghaire–Rathdown County Council election	Dún Laoghaire–Rathdown County Council elections	Succeeded by 2004 Dún Laoghaire–Rathdown County Council election
