= 2009 Dún Laoghaire–Rathdown County Council election =

Part of the 2009 Irish local elections

← 2004	5 June 2009	2014 →

28 seats on Dún Laoghaire–Rathdown County Council
	First party	Second party	Third party
Party	Fine Gael	Labour	Fianna Fáil
Seats won	11	8	4
Seat change	+2	+2	-3
	Fourth party	Fifth party	Sixth party
Party	People Before Profit	Independent	Green
Seats won	2	3	0
Seat change	+2	+2	-4
- Area of Dún Laoghaire–Rathdown County Council
Council control after election
TBD

An election to all 28 seats on Dún Laoghaire–Rathdown County Council took place on 5 June 2009 as part of the 2009 Irish local elections. Councillors were elected from six local electoral areas for a five-year term of office on the electoral system of proportional representation by means of the single transferable vote (PR-STV).

== Results by party ==
Party	Seats	±	First Pref. votes	FPv%	±%
Fine Gael	11	+2	28,754	34.35	
Labour	8	+2	19,094	22.81	
Fianna Fáil	4	-3	13,116	15.67	
Independent	3	+2	9,061	10.82	
People Before Profit	2	+2	6,266	7.49	
Green	0	-4	5,260	6.28	
Progressive Democrats	0	-1	-	-	
Totals	28	-	83,708	100.00	—

== Results by local electoral area ==
=== Ballybrack ===
Ballybrack - 5 seats
Party	Candidate	FPv%	Count				
Party	Candidate	FPv%	1	2	3	4	5
Labour	Denis O'Callaghan*	18.15	2,543				
Fine Gael	Maria Bailey*	16.40	2,298	2,314	2,353		
Labour	Carrie Smyth*	15.77	2,210	2,350			
People Before Profit	Hugh Lewis	15.52	2,175	2,194	2,450		
Fine Gael	Donal Marren*	13.97	1,957	1,968	1,999	2,074	2,455
Fianna Fáil	Gareth Crowe*	7.52	1,053	1,057	1,077	1,428	1,605
Green	Tom Kivlehan*	5.22	732	739	779	846	
Fianna Fáil	Larry Lohan	3.84	538	541	555		
Sinn Féin	Eoin O Broin	3.60	504	511			
Electorate: 25,994 Valid: 14,010 (53.90%) Spoilt: 144 Quota: 2,336 Turnout: 14,154 (54.45%)

=== Blackrock ===
Blackrock - 4 seats
Party	Candidate	FPv%	Count					
Party	Candidate	FPv%	1	2	3	4	5	6
Fine Gael	Marie Baker*	23.61	2,855					
Fine Gael	Barry Ward	16.26	1,966	2,211	2,368	2,503		
Labour	Niamh Bhreathnach*	14.74	1,782	1,868	2,076	2,172	2,918	
Independent	Victor Boyhan	13.25	1,602	1,635	1,775	1,880	2,070	2,416
Fianna Fáil	Barry Conway*	9.96	1,204	1,223	1,285	1,820	1,871	1,934
Fianna Fáil	Fred Gilligan	7.76	938	948	994			
Labour	Ronan Farren	7.74	936	957	1,105	1,151		
Green	Ruairi Holohan*	6.69	809	831				
Electorate: 21,619 Valid: 12,092 (55.93%) Spoilt: 87 Quota: 2,419 Turnout: 12,179 (56.33%)

=== Dundrum ===
Dundrum - 5 seats
Party	Candidate	FPv%	Count							
Party	Candidate	FPv%	1	2	3	4	5	6	7	8
Fine Gael	Jim O'Leary*	10.64	3,583							
Labour	Aidan Culhane*	15.67	2,727	2,817	2,925					
Fine Gael	Pat Hand*	13.48	2,347	2,751	2,832	2,878	3,012			
Fianna Fáil	Aoife Brennan	12.83	2,233	2,259	2,309	2,363	2,422	2,854	2,864	2,958
Independent	Tony Fox*	10.29	1,792	1,819	1,894	1,999	2,195	2,307	2,330	2,552
Green	Terence Corish*	7.85	1,367	1,407	1,451	1,511	1,654	1,757	1,780	2,163
Fianna Fáil	Tony Kelly	4.80	835	855	877	894	915			
Labour	Veronica O'Doherty	4.10	714	749	777	916	1,063	1,135	1,173	
Sinn Féin	Oonagh O'Reilly	3.59	619	623	654					
Independent	Seamus O'Neill	3.46	603	619	738	843				
Independent	Stephen O'Shea	3.38	588	607						
Electorate: 29,556 Valid: 17,408 (58.90%) Spoilt: 227 Quota: 2,902 Turnout: 17,635 (59.67%)

=== Dún Laoghaire ===
Dún Laoghaire - 6 seats
Party	Candidate	FPv%	Count										
Party	Candidate	FPv%	1	2	3	4	5	6	7	8	9	10	11
People Before Profit	Richard Boyd Barrett	22.81	4,091										
Fine Gael	John Bailey*	17.05	3,058										
Fine Gael	Mary Mitchell O'Connor*	11.32	2,031	2,203	2,394	2,403	2,418	2,476	2,543	2,633			
Fianna Fáil	Cormac Devlin*	7.42	1,331	1,440	1,480	1,485	1,508	1,525	1,906	1,943	1,950	2,105	2,292
Fine Gael	Tom O'Higgins*	6.90	1,237	1,307	1,390	1,394	1,400	1,425	1,457	1,501	1,513	1,806	2,084
Labour	Stephen Fitzpatrick	6.43	1,154	1,362	1,408	1,416	1,453	1,489	1,514	1,888	1,907	2,165	2,536
Green	Gene Feighery*	5.81	1,042	1,216	1,241	1,246	1,273	1,329	1,367	1,441	1,453	1,637	
Independent	Trevor Patton	5.59	1,002	1,131	1,150	1,187	1,219	1,311	1,351	1,385	1,388		
Labour	Jane Dillon-Byrne*	5.43	974	1,232	1,282	1,289	1,328	1,365	1,394	1,670	1,687	1,863	2,229
Labour	Angela Timlin	4.30	771	912	928	942	971	1,002	1,027				
Fianna Fáil	Peter O'Brien	3.61	647	678	687	691	696	709					
Independent	James Coyle	1.56	279	368	379	389	421						
Sinn Féin	Brian McNally	1.33	239	337	341	344							
Independent	Brigid Timmons	0.23	42	63	63								
Independent	Shane O'Neill	0.20	36	64	65								
Electorate: 32,655 Valid: 17,934 (54.92%) Spoilt: 196 Quota: 2,563 Turnout: 18,130 (55.52%)

=== Glencullen-Sandyford ===
Glencullen-Sandyford - 4 seats
Party	Candidate	FPv%	Count					
Party	Candidate	FPv%	1	2	3	4	5	6
Labour	Lettie McCarthy*	25.98	2,818					
Fine Gael	Neale Richmond	17.14	1,859	1,944	1,956	2,008	2,183	
Fine Gael	Tom Joyce*	15.86	1,720	1,830	1,843	1,894	2,028	2,328
Fianna Fáil	Tom Murphy	11.39	1,236	1,293	1,297	1,352	1,437	2,122
Fianna Fáil	John Byrne*	8.96	972	1,017	1,028	1,088	1,168	
Labour	Aidan O'Sulliavan	7.17	778	1,035	1,069	1,217	1,484	1,570
Green	Adrianne Wyse	6.04	655	717	776	901		
Sinn Féin	Shaun Tracey	5.91	641	664	678			
Independent	Raymond Whitehead	1.56	169	178				
Electorate: 20,556 Valid: 10,848 (52.77%) Spoilt: 109 Quota: 2,170 Turnout: 10,957 (53.30%)

=== Stillorgan ===
Stillorgan - 4 seats
Party	Candidate	FPv%	Count						
Party	Candidate	FPv%	1	2	3	4	5	6	7
Fine Gael	Barry Saul	22.79	2,602						
Independent	Gearóid O'Keeffe*	20.87	2,383						
Labour	Richard Humphreys	14.78	1,687	1,736	1,776	1,800	1,940	2,206	2,319
Fine Gael	Louise Cosgrave*	10.87	1,241	1,441	1,447	1,474	1,614	1,851	1,971
Fianna Fáil	Gerry Horkan*	9.94	1,135	1,151	1,167	1,180	1,258	1,328	2,075
Fianna Fáil	Liam Dockery	8.71	994	1,004	1,015	1,022	1,056	1,149	
Green	Meabh Cody	5.74	655	678	705	719	831		
Independent	Catriona Lawlor	4.95	565	581	611	625			
Sinn Féin	Seamus MacFloinn	1.35	154	158					
Electorate: 19,760 Valid: 11,416 (57.77%) Spoilt: 99 Quota: 2,284 Turnout: 11,515 (58.27%)
