= Mary Hanafin =

Irish former politician (born 1959)

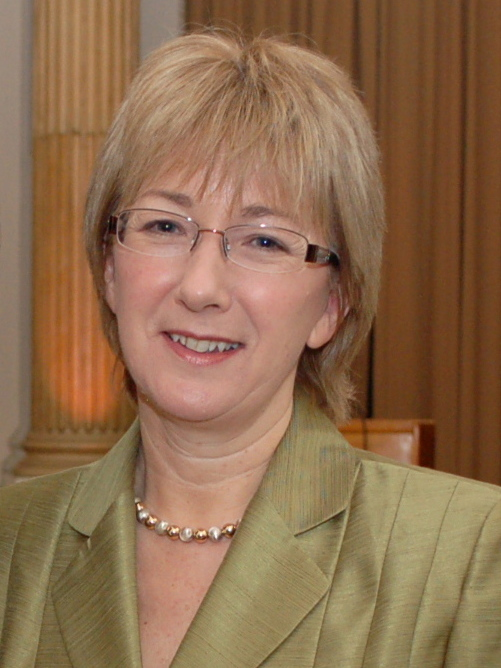
- Hanafin in 2010

Deputy leader of Fianna Fáil
- In office 31 January 2011 – 9 March 2011
- Leader: Micheál Martin
- Preceded by: Mary Coughlan
- Succeeded by: Brian Lenihan

Minister for Tourism, Culture and Sport
- In office 23 March 2010 – 9 March 2011
- Taoiseach: Brian Cowen
- Preceded by: Martin Cullen (Arts, Sport and Tourism)
- Succeeded by: Jimmy Deenihan (Arts, Heritage and Gaeltacht)

Minister for Enterprise, Trade and Innovation
- In office 20 January 2011 – 9 March 2011
- Taoiseach: Brian Cowen
- Preceded by: Batt O'Keeffe
- Succeeded by: Richard Bruton (Jobs, Enterprise and Innovation)

Minister for Social and Family Affairs
- In office 7 May 2008 – 23 March 2010
- Taoiseach: Brian Cowen
- Preceded by: Martin Cullen
- Succeeded by: Éamon Ó Cuív (Social Protection)

Minister for Education and Science
- In office 29 September 2004 – 7 May 2008
- Taoiseach: Bertie Ahern
- Preceded by: Noel Dempsey
- Succeeded by: Batt O'Keeffe

Minister of State
- 2002–2004: Government Chief Whip
- 2002–2004: Defence
- 2000–2002: Children

Teachta Dála
- In office June 1997 – February 2011
- Constituency: Dún Laoghaire

Personal details
- Born: 1 June 1959 (age 67) Thurles, County Tipperary, Ireland
- Party: Fianna Fáil
- Spouse: Eamon Leahy (m. 1985; died 2003)
- Parent: Des Hanafin (father)
- Relatives: John Hanafin (brother)
- Education: St Patrick's College, Maynooth; Dublin Institute of Technology
- Website: maryhanafin.ie

Mary Hanafin (born 1 June 1959) is an Irish former Fianna Fáil politician who served as Minister for Tourism, Culture and Sport from 2010 to 2011, Deputy leader of Fianna Fáil from January 2011 to March 2011, Minister for Enterprise, Trade and Innovation from January 2011 to March 2011, Minister for Social and Family Affairs from 2008 to 2010, Minister for Education and Science from 2004 to 2008, Government Chief Whip from 2002 to 2004 and Minister of State for Children from 2000 to 2002. She served as a Teachta Dála (TD) for the Dún Laoghaire constituency from 1997 to 2011.

She served as a Councillor on Dún Laoghaire–Rathdown County Council, representing the Blackrock local electoral area from May 2014 to June 2024.

== Early and personal life ==
Hanafin was born in Thurles, County Tipperary, in 1959. She is the daughter of Des Hanafin and Mona (nee Brady). Des Hanafin was a businessman and Fianna Fáil councillor, who later served as a Senator at various times for over twenty-five years between 1969 and 2002. Her brother John Hanafin was a member of Seanad Éireann from 2002 to 2011.

Hanafin was educated at the Presentation Convent in Thurles and St. Patrick's College in Maynooth, receiving a Bachelor of Arts degree. She subsequently worked as a secondary school teacher, teaching Irish and History in the Dominican College Sion Hill in Blackrock, Dublin. Hanafin also obtained a diploma in legal studies at the Dublin Institute of Technology.

Hanafin married Eamon Leahy, a Senior Counsel, in 1985. He died suddenly on 17 July 2003, aged 46. The couple had no children.

== Early political career ==
Hanafin was involved in politics from the age of 15. Her father Des Hanafin, as well as being a Senator for Fianna Fáil, was a founding member of the Society for the Protection of Unborn Children (SPUC) and a staunch opponent of contraception, abortion and divorce. She joined Ógra Fianna Fáil aged fifteen and spoke at her first Ard Fheis two years later. Hanafin first became involved in national politics in 1980 when, at the age of twenty-one, she was elected to the Fianna Fáil national executive, the party's ruling body.

She was elected to Dublin City Council at the 1985 local elections for the Rathmines local electoral area, but she unsuccessfully sought election to Dáil Éireann at the 1989 general election, standing in the Dublin South-East constituency. She lost her seat on Dublin City Council in 1991 and became involved in the running of the Fianna Fáil party. She was elected as national treasurer in 1993. Hanafin is also a former president of the National Youth Council of Ireland.

== Dáil career ==
Hanafin was elected to the Dáil on her second attempt, at the 1997 general election for the Dún Laoghaire constituency. In her first few years as a TD she served on a number of Oireachtas committees, including Education and Science, Heritage and the Irish language and Justice, Equality and Women's Affairs. In 2000, Hanafin was appointed Minister of State for Children. She topped the poll in her constituency at the 2002 general election and was appointed to the position of Minister of State at the Department of the Taoiseach; also a junior (non-cabinet) ministry, but with special responsibility as Government Chief Whip. She was the first woman to hold this position.

=== Minister for Education and Science ===
Hanafin was appointed as Minister for Education and Science in a cabinet reshuffle in September 2004. She abandoned the compilation of school league tables begun by her predecessor Noel Dempsey. She prioritised school bus safety following the death of five schoolgirls near Navan, County Meath, in 2005. This has mandated the provision of one seat per child and of the mandatory use of seatbelts in school buses. In 2005 she initiated vastly increased funding and staffing for children with special needs. She announced plans for a possible change of entry requirements to third-level medical education.

Hanafin was accused of bias towards private fee-paying schools in her constituency when awarding building grants to them in 2005. Christian Brothers College, Monkstown Park, and St. Andrew's College both received building grants for extensions and works on their buildings. Only Belvedere College, Kilkenny College and Loreto Beaufort, Rathfarnham, had previously received money since 1995.

Diplomatic cables published by Wikileaks revealed that in 2005 Hanafin had briefed the American Ambassador to Ireland on government coalition negotiations. She criticized her Green Party coalition colleagues saying that they wanted to prioritize "hares, stags and badgers while everyone else in the country is drowning in this economy".

In February 2008, it emerged that Hanafin, while Government Chief Whip, had assisted poet Cathal Ó Searcaigh to obtain an Irish visa for a Nepalese youth. The allegations were contained in the documentary Fairytale of Kathmandu. Hanafin, who admitted being friends with Ó Searcaigh for many years, dismissed the allegations as an "irresponsible piece of journalism". Ó Searcaigh was later investigated by Irish authorities to establish whether he should be prosecuted under the Sexual Offences Act for sleeping with boys in Nepal who would be considered under-age in Ireland.

Hanafin was accused in February 2008 of being oblivious to the plight of parents of children with autism, and of taking an imperious view of their parents' situation, when she decided to engage in a 68-day court battle with two parents who were attempting to obtain appropriate education for their children through the applied behavior analysis (ABA) method. She and her department were accused of ignoring reality of autism education requirements. The mother, Yvonne Ui Cuanachain, said: "Well I would reject the Minister's position quite completely and I feel it's actually quite cynically misrepresentative of the situation on the ground. The Department of Education does not support ABA, it does not support ABA within the ABA schools and neither does it support ABA within the eclectic classes."

=== Minister for Social and Family Affairs ===
On 7 May 2008, Hanafin was appointed as Minister for Social and Family Affairs by new Taoiseach Brian Cowen. She abolished an independent agency, Combat Poverty, by subsuming it into the department.

In late May 2009, a newspaper ran a story claiming Hanafin's office had used taxpayer-funded resources to promote Peter O'Brien in correspondence to voters in the ahead of the 2009 local elections. O'Brien was not elected at those local elections.

=== Minister for Tourism, Culture and Sport ===
On 23 March 2010, Hanafin was moved from Social and Family Affairs to the Tourism, Culture and Sport portfolio. She appointed a Fianna Fáil councillor and friend of Brian Cowen to the board of the Irish Sports Council on her last full day as Tourism, Culture and Sport Minister.

=== Minister for Enterprise, Trade and Innovation ===
Following the resignation of Batt O'Keeffe in January 2011, Hanafin was also appointed as Minister for Enterprise, Trade and Innovation.

=== 2011 general election ===
On 22 January 2011, after the resignation of Brian Cowen, Hanafin put her name forward as a candidate for leader of Fianna Fáil. She was appointed deputy leader on 31 January 2011. At the 2011 general election she lost her Dáil seat. She briefly withdrew from public life, but in April 2011, the Fianna Fáil National Executive co-opted her as one of the five vice-presidents of the party.

== After national politics ==
=== Television ===
In January 2012, she appeared as a judge on the TG4 television show An G-Team. In 2014 Hanafin received a master's degree in American Studies at the Clinton Institute in University College Dublin.

=== Business interests ===
Hanafin is reported to have extensive business interests. In June 2008, it was reported she owned a 15% shareholding in Reservoir Resources, an oil exploration company. In September 2013, it was reported she had bought shares in a company which owns Zaragoza, a Dublin tapas bar.

== Return to politics ==
=== 2014 local elections ===
In May 2014, Hanafin lodged nomination papers with Dún Laoghaire–Rathdown County Council to contest the local government elections in the Blackrock area, against the wishes of Fianna Fáil leader Micheál Martin. Following a three-week campaign—dubbed the "Battle of Blackrock"—she was elected, taking the second out of six seats in the Blackrock local electoral area.

=== Dún Laoghaire–Rathdown County Council ===
==== State pensions and council expenses ====
Hanafin said she did not take expenses from Dún Laoghaire–Rathdown County Council, instead she continued to draw her various state pensions accruing from her time as a teacher, TD and Minister. In July 2015, an RTÉ investigative report estimated the state had paid her €520,775 in pension and lump sum payments since 2011. This figure excludes any pension associated with her time as a teacher.

=== 2016 general election campaign ===
In April 2014, Hanafin indicated that she intended to seek the Fianna Fáil nomination in Dún Laoghaire for the next general election. Her fellow councillors Cormac Devlin and Kate Feeney also expressed an interest in seeking the nomination. The contest attracted widespread media attention being dubbed the "Battle of Blackrock II".

In early September 2015, there was widespread speculation the Fianna Fáil National Constituencies Committee would attempt to exclude Cormac Devlin from the Dún Laoghaire candidate selection convention on the basis of his gender. Following the threat of legal action from Devlin, the party backed down.

Hanafin lost the Dún Laoghaire Fianna Fáil selection convention on 28 September 2015, coming second to Cormac Devlin.

Two days after the selection convention, on 30 September 2015, the National Constituencies Committee of Fianna Fáil, chaired by Michael Moynihan TD, recommended Hanafin be added to the general election ticket in Dún Laoghaire.

In October 2015, it emerged that Hanafin, while Minister for Tourism in 2009, supported potential legislation to introduce a €500 water charge and metering system in July 2010, five months before the bailout.

In January 2016, Hanafin announced she was seeking a place on the Fianna Fáil Front Bench. Micheal Martin refused to be drawn on the issue, instead emphasising a desire to promote a new generation of TDs. Following his rebuff, Hanafin gave a series of interviews which appeared to undermine his authority, in particular she questioned his position on entering coalition government with Fine Gael. Her remarks prompted Mary Cowen, wife of former Taoiseach, Brian Cowen, to publicly comment that Micheal Martin should "watch his back" around Hanafin. The spat continued with Hanafin claiming Mary Cowen's remarks were inappropriate.

In the 2016 general election Hanafin failed to regain a seat in the Dáil, finishing fifth in the four-seat Dún Laoghaire constituency.

=== 2019 European Parliament election ===
In December 2018, Hanafin announced her intention to seek the Fianna Fáil nomination for the Dublin constituency in the European Parliament. Barry Andrews was selected as the Fianna Fáil candidate.

=== 2020 general election ===
She was an unsuccessful candidate for the Dún Laoghaire constituency at the 2020 general election.

In June 2022, she was elected as Cathaoirleach of Dún Laoghaire–Rathdown County Council. Hanafin did not contest the 2024 Dún Laoghaire–Rathdown County Council election.

=== 2025 presidential election ===
Hanafin had sought a nomination from members of the Fianna Fáil party to run for president of Ireland in the next Irish presidential election, due to be held before the end of 2025, but on 31 August 2025, she announced she was withdrawing, after failing to secure the support of the party's leadership.

== Political views ==
In May 2025, the Phoenix described Hanafin as a "strong pro-life supporter".

Political offices
Preceded by Frank Fahey	Minister of State for Children; 2000–2002	Succeeded by Brian Lenihan
Preceded by Séamus Brennan	Government Chief Whip; 2002–2004	Succeeded by Tom Kitt
Preceded by Séamus Brennan	Minister of State at the Department of Defence; 2002–2004	Succeeded by Tom Kitt
Preceded by Noel Dempsey	Minister for Education and Science; 2004–2008	Succeeded by Batt O'Keeffe
Preceded by Martin Cullen	Minister for Social and Family Affairs; 2008–2010	Succeeded by Éamon Ó Cuív as Minister for Social Protection
Preceded by Martin Cullen as Minister for Arts, Sport and Tourism	Minister for Tourism, Culture and Sport; 2010–2011	Succeeded by Jimmy Deenihan as Arts, Heritage and the Gaeltacht
Preceded by Martin Cullen as Minister for Arts, Sport and Tourism	Minister for Tourism, Culture and Sport; 2010–2011	Succeeded by Leo Varadkar as Minister for Transport, Tourism and Sport
Preceded by Batt O'Keeffe	Minister for Enterprise, Trade and Innovation; 2011–2011	Succeeded by Richard Bruton as Minister for Jobs, Enterprise and Innovation
Party political offices
Preceded by Mary Coughlan	Deputy leader of Fianna Fáil; 2011	Succeeded by Brian Lenihan Jnr
Preceded by ?	Vice-president of Fianna Fáil; 2011–2012	Succeeded by ?

Dáil	Election	Deputy (Party)	Deputy (Party)	Deputy (Party)	Deputy (Party)	Deputy (Party)
21st	1977	David Andrews (FF)	Liam Cosgrave (FG)	Barry Desmond (Lab)	Martin O'Donoghue (FF)	4 seats 1977–1981
22nd	1981	David Andrews (FF)	Liam T. Cosgrave (FG)	Barry Desmond (Lab)	Martin O'Donoghue (FF)	Seán Barrett (FG)
23rd	1982 (Feb)	David Andrews (FF)	Liam T. Cosgrave (FG)	Barry Desmond (Lab)	Martin O'Donoghue (FF)	Seán Barrett (FG)
24th	1982 (Nov)	David Andrews (FF)	Liam T. Cosgrave (FG)	Barry Desmond (Lab)	Monica Barnes (FG)	Seán Barrett (FG)
25th	1987	David Andrews (FF)	Geraldine Kennedy (PDs)	Barry Desmond (Lab)	Monica Barnes (FG)	Seán Barrett (FG)
26th	1989	David Andrews (FF)	Brian Hillery (FF)	Eamon Gilmore (WP)	Monica Barnes (FG)	Seán Barrett (FG)
27th	1992	David Andrews (FF)	Helen Keogh (PDs)	Eamon Gilmore (DL)	Niamh Bhreathnach (Lab)	Seán Barrett (FG)
28th	1997	David Andrews (FF)	Monica Barnes (FG)	Eamon Gilmore (Lab)	Mary Hanafin (FF)	Seán Barrett (FG)
29th	2002	Barry Andrews (FF)	Fiona O'Malley (PDs)	Eamon Gilmore (Lab)	Mary Hanafin (FF)	Ciarán Cuffe (GP)
30th	2007	Barry Andrews (FF)	Seán Barrett (Note: Served as Ceann Comhairle in the 31st Dáil from 2011 to 2016 and was returned automatically at the 2016 general election.) (FG)	Eamon Gilmore (Lab)	Mary Hanafin (FF)	Ciarán Cuffe (GP)
31st	2011	Mary Mitchell O'Connor (FG)	Seán Barrett (FG)	Eamon Gilmore (Lab)	Richard Boyd Barrett (PBP)	4 seats from 2011
32nd	2016	Mary Mitchell O'Connor (FG)	Seán Barrett (FG)	Maria Bailey (FG)	Richard Boyd Barrett (AAA–PBP)	4 seats from 2011
33rd	2020	Jennifer Carroll MacNeill (FG)	Ossian Smyth (GP)	Cormac Devlin (FF)	Richard Boyd Barrett (S–PBP)	4 seats from 2011
34th	2024	Jennifer Carroll MacNeill (FG)	Barry Ward (FG)	Cormac Devlin (FF)	Richard Boyd Barrett (PBP–S)	4 seats from 2011
