= Dún Laoghaire (Dáil constituency) =

Dáil constituency (1977–present)

- Dáil constituency
- Location of Dún Laoghaire within County Dublin
- Interactive map of constituency boundaries since the 2024 general election
- Population: 123,546 (2016)
- Major settlements: Ballybrack; Blackrock; Booterstown; Cabinteely; Dalkey; Dún Laoghaire; Monkstown; Sallynoggin

Current constituency
- Created: 1977
- Seats: 4 (1977–1981); 5 (1981–2011); 4 (2011–)
- TDs: Richard Boyd Barrett (PBP–S); Jennifer Carroll MacNeill (FG); Cormac Devlin (FF); Barry Ward (FG)
- Local government areas: Dún Laoghaire–Rathdown (since 1994); County Dublin (to 1994)
- EP constituency: Dublin

Dún Laoghaire is a parliamentary constituency represented in Dáil Éireann, the lower house of the Irish parliament or Oireachtas. The constituency elects four deputies (Teachtaí Dála, commonly known as TDs) on the system of proportional representation by means of the single transferable vote (PR-STV). It is in the eastern part of the county of Dún Laoghaire–Rathdown.

== History and boundaries ==
The constituency was created in 1977, succeeding the earlier Dún Laoghaire and Rathdown constituency which had been created in 1948. The constituency is in the eastern coastal area of Dún Laoghaire–Rathdown county (part of Dublin County Council till 1994), including the town of Dún Laoghaire and the villages of Ballybrack, Blackrock, Booterstown, Cabinteely (east of the N11 road), Dalkey, Deansgrange, Glasthule, Killiney, Loughlinstown, Monkstown, Sallynoggin, Shankill, and Stillorgan.

The Constituency Review Report 2023 of the Electoral Commission recommended that at the next general election, Dún Laoghaire be altered with the transfer of territory to Dublin Rathdown.

For the 2024 general election, the Electoral (Amendment) Act 2023 defines the constituency as:

"In the county of Dún Laoghaire–Rathdown, the electoral divisions of:

Ballybrack, Blackrock-Booterstown, Blackrock-Carysfort, Blackrock-Central, Blackrock-Glenomena, Blackrock-Monkstown, Blackrock-Newpark, Blackrock-Seapoint, Blackrock-Stradbrook, Blackrock-Templehill, Blackrock-Williamstown, Cabinteely-Granitefield, Cabinteely-Kilbogget, Cabinteely-Loughlinstown, Cabinteely-Pottery, Dalkey-Avondale, Dalkey-Bullock, Dalkey-Coliemore, Dalkey Hill, Dalkey Upper, Dún Laoghaire-East Central, Dún Laoghaire-Glasthule, Dún Laoghaire-Glenageary, Dún Laoghaire-Monkstown Farm, Dún Laoghaire-Mount Town, Dún Laoghaire-Sallynoggin East, Dún Laoghaire-Sallynoggin South, Dún Laoghaire-Sallynoggin West, Dún Laoghaire-Salthill, Dún Laoghaire-Sandycove, Dún Laoghaire-West Central, Foxrock-Beechpark, Foxrock-Deansgrange, Killiney North, Killiney South, Shankill-Rathmichael, Shankill-Rathsallagh, Shankill-Shanganagh, Stillorgan-Priory."

Changes to the Dún Laoghaire constituency
Years	TDs	Boundaries	Notes
1977–1981	4	In County Dublin, the borough of Dún Laoghaire and the district electoral divisions of Stillorgan Number Two, Stillorgan Number Three, Stillorgan Number Four, Stillorgan Number Five; and that part of the district electoral division of Stillorgan Number One situated within a line drawn as follows: commencing at the point where the centre line of Kilmacud Road Upper meets the northern boundary of the district electoral division, then in a south-westerly direction along the centre of Kilmacud Road Upper to the point where it meets the imaginary north-westerly projection of the southern boundary of St. Josephs Carmelite Monastery, then continuing, initially in a south-easterly direction, along the aforesaid projection and boundary to the point where it meets the western boundary of No. 75 Merville Road, then continuing, initially in a south-easterly direction, along the western boundary of each of the following—No. 75 Merville Road, Merville Road and No. 78 Merville Road—to the point where the western boundary of No. 78 Merville Road meets the rear boundary of No. 1 Weirview Drive, then continuing, initially in a south-easterly direction, along the rear boundary of the houses on the western and southern sides of Weirview Drive to the point where the rear boundary of No. 131 Weirview Drive meets the southern boundary of the Electricity Supply Board property on Brewery Road, then continuing from that point, initially in an easterly direction, along the southern boundary of the said property and the imaginary easterly projection of that boundary to the point where that projection meets the district electoral division boundary, then continuing, initially in a north-easterly direction, along the district electoral division boundary to the point first mentioned.	Created from the former constituency of Dún Laoghaire and Rathdown.
1981–1992	5	In County Dublin, the borough of Dún Laoghaire and the district electoral divisions of Ballybrack Number One, Ballybrack Number Two, Rathmichael, Stillorgan Number Two, Stillorgan Number Three, Stillorgan Number Four, Stillorgan Number Five.	Transfer of Ballybrack Number One, Ballybrack Number Two, Rathmichael and the remainder of Stillorgan Number One from Dublin County South.
1992–2007	5	In County Dublin, the borough of Dún Laoghaire and the district electoral divisions of Ballybrack, Blackrock-Carysfort, Blackrock-Newpark, Blackrock-Stradbrook, Cabinteely-Granitefield, Cabinteely-Kilbogget, Cabinteely-Loughlinstown, Cabinteely-Pottery, Dalkey-Avondale, Dún Laoghaire-Sallynoggin South, Foxrock-Beechpark, Foxrock-Carrickmines, Foxrock-Deansgrange, Foxrock-Torquay, Shankill-Rathmichael, Shankill-Rathsallagh, Shankill-Shanganagh, Stillorgan-Leopardstown, Stillorgan-Priory; and that part of the district electoral division of Glencullen situated east of a line drawn along the Enniskerry Road; and those parts of the district electoral divisions of Stillorgan-Merville and Stillorgan-Mount Merrion situated east of a line drawn-along the Stillorgan Road.	Transfer of the Kilternan-Stepaside area from Dublin South. New definitions of DEDs.
1997–2002	5	In Dún Laoghaire–Rathdown, the electoral divisions of Ballybrack, Blackrock-Carysfort, Blackrock-Central, Blackrock-Monkstown, Blackrock-Newpark, Blackrock-Seapoint, Blackrock-Stradbrook, Blackrock-Templehill, Blackrock-Williamstown, Cabinteely-Granitefield, Cabinteely-Kilbogget, Cabinteely-Loughlinstown, Cabinteely-Pottery, Dalkey-Avondale, Dalkey-Bullock, Dalkey-Coliemore, Dalkey Hill, Dalkey Upper, Dún Laoghaire-East Central, Dún Laoghaire-Glasthule, Dún Laoghaire-Glenageary, Dún Laoghaire-Monkstown Farm, Dún Laoghaire-Mount Town, Dún Laoghaire-Sandycove, Dún Laoghaire-Sallynoggin East, Dún Laoghaire-Sallynoggin South, Dún Laoghaire-Sallynoggin West, Dún Laoghaire-Salthill, Dún Laoghaire-West Central, Foxrock-Beechpark, Foxrock-Carrickmines, Foxrock-Deansgrange, Foxrock-Torquay, Killiney North, Killiney South, Shankill-Rathmichael, Shankill-Rathsallagh, Shankill-Shanganagh, Stillorgan-Leopardstown, Stillorgan-Priory; and those parts of the district electoral divisions of Stillorgan-Merville and Stillorgan-Mount Merrion situated east of a line drawn along the Old Stillorgan Road; and that part of the district electoral division of Blackrock-Booterstown situated south of a line drawn as follows— commencing at the southernmost junction of the western boundary of the district electoral division with the rear boundary of number 36 Trimleston Gardens, thence commencing in a north-easterly direction and proceeding along the said rear boundary and the rear boundaries of numbers 35 to 1 Trimleston Gardens to the junction of the rear boundary of number 1 Trimleston Gardens with the rear boundary of number 14 Trimleston Avenue, thence commencing in a north-easterly direction and proceeding along the rear boundaries of numbers 14 to 1 Trimleston Avenue to the junction of the rear boundary of number 1 Trimleston Avenue with the eastern boundary of the said number 1 Trimleston Avenue, thence in a south-easterly direction along the imaginary south-easterly projection of the said eastern boundary to its junction with the northern boundary of number 9 Rock Road, thence commencing in a north-easterly direction and proceeding along the said boundary and its imaginary easterly projection to its junction with the eastern boundary of the district electoral division.	Transfer of Glencullen to Dublin South. Transfer of the Trimleston area of Booterstown to Dublin South-East.
2002–2011	5	In Dún Laoghaire–Rathdown, the electoral divisions of Ballybrack, Blackrock-Booterstown, Blackrock-Carysfort, Blackrock-Central, Blackrock-Glenomena, Blackrock-Monkstown, Blackrock-Newpark, Blackrock-Seapoint, Blackrock-Stradbrook, Blackrock-Templehill, Blackrock-Williamstown, Cabinteely-Granitefield, Cabinteely-Kilbogget, Cabinteely-Pottery, Dalkey-Avondale, Dalkey-Bullock, Dalkey-Coliemore, Dalkey Hill, Dalkey Upper, Dún Laoghaire-East Central, Dún Laoghaire-Glasthule, Dún Laoghaire-Glenageary, Dún Laoghaire-Monkstown Farm, Dún Laoghaire-Mount Town, Dún Laoghaire-Sallynoggin East, Dún Laoghaire-Sallynoggin South, Dún Laoghaire-Sallynoggin West, Dún Laoghaire-Salthill, Dún Laoghaire-Sandycove, Dún Laoghaire-West Central, Foxrock-Beechpark, Foxrock-Carrickmines, Foxrock-Deansgrange, Foxrock-Torquay, Killiney North, Killiney South, Shankill-Rathmichael, Shankill-Rathsallagh, Shankill-Shanganagh, Stillorgan-Priory; and those parts of the electoral divisions of Cabinteely-Loughlinstown and Stillorgan-Leopardstown which are not comprised in the constituency of Dublin South.	Transfer of Trimleston area of Booterstown from Dublin South-East, transfer of areas in Stillorgan, Leopardstown and Glenamuck to Dublin South.
2011–2016	4	In Dún Laoghaire–Rathdown, the electoral divisions of Ballybrack, Blackrock-Booterstown, Blackrock-Carysfort, Blackrock-Central, Blackrock-Glenomena, Blackrock-Monkstown, Blackrock-Newpark, Blackrock-Seapoint, Blackrock-Stradbrook, Blackrock-Templehill, Blackrock-Williamstown, Cabinteely-Granitefield, Cabinteely-Kilbogget, Cabinteely-Pottery, Dalkey-Avondale, Dalkey-Bullock, Dalkey-Coliemore, Dalkey Hill, Dalkey Upper, Dún Laoghaire-East Central, Dún Laoghaire-Glasthule, Dún Laoghaire-Glenageary, Dún Laoghaire-Monkstown Farm, Dún Laoghaire-Mount Town, Dún Laoghaire-Sallynoggin East, Dún Laoghaire-Sallynoggin South, Dún Laoghaire-Sallynoggin West, Dún Laoghaire-Salthill, Dún Laoghaire-Sandycove, Dún Laoghaire-West Central, Foxrock-Beechpark, Foxrock-Deansgrange, Killiney North, Killiney South, Shankill-Rathmichael, Shankill-Rathsallagh, Shankill-Shanganagh, Stillorgan-Priory.	Transfer to Dubin South of Foxrock-Carrickmines, Foxrock-Torquay and the remaining parts of Cabinteely-Loughlinstown and Stillorgan-Leopardstown (part north-east of former Harcourt Street-Bray railway line).
2016–2020	4	In Dún Laoghaire–Rathdown, the electoral divisions of Ballybrack, Blackrock-Booterstown, Blackrock-Carysfort, Blackrock-Central, Blackrock-Glenomena, Blackrock-Monkstown, Blackrock-Newpark, Blackrock-Seapoint, Blackrock-Stradbrook, Blackrock-Templehill, Blackrock-Williamstown, Cabinteely-Granitefield, Cabinteely-Kilbogget, Cabinteely-Loughlinstown, Cabinteely-Pottery, Dalkey-Avondale, Dalkey-Bullock, Dalkey-Coliemore, Dalkey Hill, Dalkey Upper, Dún Laoghaire-East Central, Dún Laoghaire-Glasthule, Dún Laoghaire-Glenageary, Dún Laoghaire-Monkstown Farm, Dún Laoghaire-Mount Town, Dún Laoghaire-Sallynoggin East, Dún Laoghaire-Sallynoggin South, Dún Laoghaire-Sallynoggin West, Dún Laoghaire-Salthill, Dún Laoghaire-Sandycove, Dún Laoghaire-West Central, Foxrock-Beechpark, Foxrock-Carrickmines, Foxrock-Deansgrange, Foxrock-Torquay, Killiney North, Killiney South, Shankill-Rathmichael, Shankill-Rathsallagh, Shankill-Shanganagh, Stillorgan-Leopardstown, Stillorgan-Priory.	Transfer of Cabinteely-Loughlinstown, Foxrock-Carrickmines, Foxrock-Torquay and Stillorgan-Leopardstown from the former Dublin South.
2020–	4	In Dún Laoghaire–Rathdown, the electoral divisions of Ballybrack, Blackrock-Booterstown, Blackrock-Carysfort, Blackrock-Central, Blackrock-Glenomena, Blackrock-Monkstown, Blackrock-Newpark, Blackrock-Seapoint, Blackrock-Stradbrook, Blackrock-Templehill, Blackrock-Williamstown, Cabinteely-Granitefield, Cabinteely-Kilbogget, Cabinteely-Loughlinstown, Cabinteely-Pottery, Dalkey-Avondale, Dalkey-Bullock, Dalkey-Coliemore, Dalkey Hill, Dalkey Upper, Dún Laoghaire-East Central, Dún Laoghaire-Glasthule, Dún Laoghaire-Glenageary, Dún Laoghaire-Monkstown Farm, Dún Laoghaire-Mount Town, Dún Laoghaire-Sallynoggin East, Dún Laoghaire-Sallynoggin South, Dún Laoghaire-Sallynoggin West, Dún Laoghaire-Salthill, Dún Laoghaire-Sandycove, Dún Laoghaire-West Central, Foxrock-Beechpark, Foxrock-Carrickmines, Foxrock-Deansgrange, Foxrock-Torquay, Killiney North, Killiney South, Shankill-Rathmichael, Shankill-Rathsallagh, Shankill-Shanganagh, Stillorgan-Leopardstown, Stillorgan-Priory; and that part of the electoral division of Glencullen that lies to the east of the M50 Motorway and to the south of the N31 and the Leopardstown Road.	Transfer from Dublin Rathdown of that part of the electoral division of Glencullen which lies to the east of the M50 motorway and to the south of the N31 and the Leopardstown Road.

== TDs ==
Teachtaí Dála (TDs) for Dún Laoghaire 1977–
Key to parties: AAA–PBP = AAA–PBP; DL = Democratic Left; FF = Fianna Fáil; FG = Fine Gael; GP = Green; Lab = Labour; PBP = People Before Profit; PBP–S = PBP–Solidarity; PDs = Progressive Democrats; S–PBP = Solidarity–PBP; WP = Workers' Party
Dáil	Election	Deputy (Party)	Deputy (Party)	Deputy (Party)	Deputy (Party)	Deputy (Party)
21st	1977	David Andrews (FF)	Liam Cosgrave (FG)	Barry Desmond (Lab)	Martin O'Donoghue (FF)	4 seats 1977–1981
22nd	1981	David Andrews (FF)	Liam T. Cosgrave (FG)	Barry Desmond (Lab)	Martin O'Donoghue (FF)	Seán Barrett (FG)
23rd	1982 (Feb)	David Andrews (FF)	Liam T. Cosgrave (FG)	Barry Desmond (Lab)	Martin O'Donoghue (FF)	Seán Barrett (FG)
24th	1982 (Nov)	David Andrews (FF)	Liam T. Cosgrave (FG)	Barry Desmond (Lab)	Monica Barnes (FG)	Seán Barrett (FG)
25th	1987	David Andrews (FF)	Geraldine Kennedy (PDs)	Barry Desmond (Lab)	Monica Barnes (FG)	Seán Barrett (FG)
26th	1989	David Andrews (FF)	Brian Hillery (FF)	Eamon Gilmore (WP)	Monica Barnes (FG)	Seán Barrett (FG)
27th	1992	David Andrews (FF)	Helen Keogh (PDs)	Eamon Gilmore (DL)	Niamh Bhreathnach (Lab)	Seán Barrett (FG)
28th	1997	David Andrews (FF)	Monica Barnes (FG)	Eamon Gilmore (Lab)	Mary Hanafin (FF)	Seán Barrett (FG)
29th	2002	Barry Andrews (FF)	Fiona O'Malley (PDs)	Eamon Gilmore (Lab)	Mary Hanafin (FF)	Ciarán Cuffe (GP)
30th	2007	Barry Andrews (FF)	Seán Barrett (Note: Served as Ceann Comhairle in the 31st Dáil from 2011 to 2016 and was returned automatically at the 2016 general election.) (FG)	Eamon Gilmore (Lab)	Mary Hanafin (FF)	Ciarán Cuffe (GP)
31st	2011	Mary Mitchell O'Connor (FG)	Seán Barrett (FG)	Eamon Gilmore (Lab)	Richard Boyd Barrett (PBP)	4 seats from 2011
32nd	2016	Mary Mitchell O'Connor (FG)	Seán Barrett (FG)	Maria Bailey (FG)	Richard Boyd Barrett (AAA–PBP)	4 seats from 2011
33rd	2020	Jennifer Carroll MacNeill (FG)	Ossian Smyth (GP)	Cormac Devlin (FF)	Richard Boyd Barrett (S–PBP)	4 seats from 2011
34th	2024	Jennifer Carroll MacNeill (FG)	Barry Ward (FG)	Cormac Devlin (FF)	Richard Boyd Barrett (PBP–S)	4 seats from 2011

Note: The columns in this table are used only for presentational purposes, and no significance should be attached to the order of columns. For details of the order in which seats were won at each election, see the detailed results of that election.

== Elections ==
*: Outgoing TD

=== 2024 general election ===
2024 general election: Dún Laoghaire
Party	Candidate	FPv%	Count						
Party	Candidate	FPv%	1	2	3	4	5	6	7
Fine Gael	Jennifer Carroll MacNeill	21.0	11,685						
Fianna Fáil	Cormac Devlin	15.9	8,831	8,947	8,993	9,820	10,161	11,066	11,381
Fine Gael	Barry Ward	15.0	8,337	8,696	8,743	9,000	9,476	10,805	10,992
PBP–Solidarity	Richard Boyd Barrett (Note: Boyd Barrett is a member of People Before Profit.)	12.2	6,795	6,809	6,915	7,242	7,717	8,512	12,130
Sinn Féin	Shane O'Brien	9.0	4,995	4,997	5,082	5,453	5,568	5,668	
Green	Ossian Smyth	7.7	4,297	4,320	4,348	4,434	5,320		
Social Democrats	Hugo Mills	7.5	4,192	4,204	4,269	4,488	5,486	7,489	8,512
Labour	Martha Fanning	5.7	3,169	3,188	3,220	3,367			
Aontú	Mairéad Tóibín	4.2	2,376	2,380	2,828				
The Irish People	Cathy Lynch	1.2	649	650					
Independent	Michael O'Doherty	0.6	343	344					
Electorate: 95,462 Valid: 55,669 Spoilt: 247 Quota: 11,134 Turnout: 55,916 (58.6%)

=== 2020 general election ===
2020 general election: Dún Laoghaire
Party	Candidate	FPv%	Count							
Party	Candidate	FPv%	1	2	3	4	5	6	7	8
Solidarity–PBP	Richard Boyd Barrett (Note: Boyd Barrett was a member of People Before Profit.)	15.5	9,632	9,746	10,119	10,628	10,902	11,119	16,364	
Green	Ossian Smyth	14.9	9,300	9,391	10,170	11,532	11,900	12,510		
Fine Gael	Jennifer Carroll MacNeill	12.4	7,754	7,787	7,891	8,337	8,656	11,488	11,666	12,061
Fine Gael	Mary Mitchell O'Connor	11.8	7,330	7,355	7,440	7,685	8,067	10,136	10,281	10,612
Sinn Féin	Shane O'Brien	9.6	6,002	6,054	6,226	6,349	6,401	6,432		
Fine Gael	Barry Ward	9.2	5,744	5,796	5,892	6,140	6,349			
Fianna Fáil	Cormac Devlin	9.2	5,715	5,815	6,331	6,530	9,527	9,994	10,301	11,071
Fianna Fáil	Mary Hanafin	6.7	4,196	4,262	4,603	4,752				
Labour	Juliet O'Connell	4.8	3,009	3,048	3,372					
Social Democrats	Dave Quinn	2.2	1,382	1,419						
Aontú	Mairéad Tóibín	1.9	1,185	1,539						
Independent	John Waters (Note: Waters was endorsed by Anti-Corruption Ireland.)	1.5	925							
Irish Freedom	Con Óg Ó Laoghaire	0.2	119							
Electorate: 99,811 Valid: 62,293 Spoilt: 357 (0.6%) Quota: 12,459 Turnout: 62,250 (62.8%)

=== 2016 general election ===
Seán Barrett was Ceann Comhairle at the dissolution of the 31st Dáil and therefore deemed to be returned automatically. The constituency was treated as a three-seater for the purposes of calculating the quota.

2016 general election: Dún Laoghaire
Party	Candidate	FPv%	Count						
Party	Candidate	FPv%	1	2	3	4	5	6	7
Fine Gael	Seán Barrett	N/A	Returned automatically						
Fine Gael	Mary Mitchell O'Connor	18.3	10,817	11,088	11,130	11,433	11,967	12,393	14,941
Fine Gael	Maria Bailey	17.7	10,489	10,882	10,934	11,270	11,854	12,422	15,198
AAA–PBP	Richard Boyd Barrett	16.5	9,775	10,008	12,215	13,287	14,761	15,718	
Fianna Fáil	Mary Hanafin	10.9	6,478	6,709	6,792	6,986	7,290	10,221	10,969
Labour	Carrie Smyth	8.8	5,192	5,296	5,385	5,739	6,895	7,165	
Fianna Fáil	Cormac Devlin	7.9	4,665	4,877	5,055	5,265	5,564		
Green	Ossian Smyth	5.9	3,478	3,677	3,833	4,750			
Sinn Féin	Shane O'Brien	5.3	3,167	3,209					
Independent	Carol Hunt	5.3	3,152	3,410	3,610				
Renua	Frank Cronin	3.1	1,812						
Direct Democracy	Raymond Whitehead	0.4	213						
Electorate: 92,248 Valid: 59,238 Spoilt: 401 Quota: 14,810 Turnout: 59,639 (64.7%)

=== 2011 general election ===
2011 general election: Dún Laoghaire
Party	Candidate	FPv%	Count										
Party	Candidate	FPv%	1	2	3	4	5	6	7	8	9	10	11
Labour	Eamon Gilmore	20.2	11,468										
Fine Gael	Seán Barrett	18.5	10,504	10,516	10,538	10,573	10,666	10,913	11,274	11,723			
Fine Gael	Mary Mitchell O'Connor	16.0	9,087	9,094	9,120	9,163	9,239	9,568	9,998	10,309	10,451	13,005	
People Before Profit	Richard Boyd Barrett (Note: Boyd Barrett campaigned as a member of the United Left Alliance.)	10.9	6,206	6,228	6,271	6,332	6,384	6,795	7,132	7,413	7,453	9,914	10,794
Labour	Ivana Bacik	10.1	5,749	5,826	5,857	5,904	5,916	6,200	6,953	7,260	7,306		
Fianna Fáil	Mary Hanafin	9.0	5,090	5,096	5,107	5,130	5,217	5,392	5,606	7,874	8,013	8,889	9,420
Fianna Fáil	Barry Andrews	6.2	3,542	3,545	3,554	3,569	3,594	3,713	3,886				
Green	Ciarán Cuffe	3.8	2,156	2,158	2,187	2,222	2,234	2,429					
Independent	Victor Boyhan	1.5	834	835	851	912	941						
Independent	Carl Haughton	0.8	456	457	500	563	594						
Independent	Trevor Patton	0.8	445	446	467	500	515						
Christian Solidarity	Daire Fitzgerald	0.8	434	434	441	450							
New Vision	Nick Crawford (Note: New Vision was an electoral alliance of independent non-party candidates and did not appear on the ballot.)	0.7	394	394	438								
Independent	Mike Deegan	0.5	311	311									
Electorate: 80,115 Valid: 56,676 Spoilt: 481 (0.8%) Quota: 11,336 Turnout: 57,157 (71.3%)

=== 2007 general election ===
2007 general election: Dún Laoghaire
Party	Candidate	FPv%	Count									
Party	Candidate	FPv%	1	2	3	4	5	6	7	8	9	10
Fianna Fáil	Mary Hanafin	20.2	11,884									
Fianna Fáil	Barry Andrews	14.6	8,587	9,977								
Labour	Eamon Gilmore	12.2	7,127	7,254	7,492	7,514	8,720	9,225	9,937			
Fine Gael	Seán Barrett	9.2	5,361	5,418	5,456	5,465	5,640	6,274	8,581	8,633	13,090	
People Before Profit	Richard Boyd Barrett	8.9	5,233	5,294	5,798	5,813	5,943	6,362	6,705	6,732	7,139	7,890
Green	Ciarán Cuffe	7.7	4,534	4,626	4,865	4,886	5,173	6,045	6,368	6,399	7,357	9,910
Fine Gael	John Bailey	7.3	4,309	4,359	4,406	4,415	4,547	4,932				
Fine Gael	Eugene Regan	7.1	4,162	4,209	4,230	4,237	4,497	5,186	6,248	6,289		
Progressive Democrats	Fiona O'Malley	6.7	3,959	4,165	4,212	4,309	4,437					
Labour	Oisín Quinn	3.9	2,265	2,316	2,366	2,377						
Sinn Féin	Eoin Ó Broin	2.2	1,292	1,309								
Electorate: 89,035 Valid: 58,713 Spoilt: 397 (0.7%) Quota: 9,786 Turnout: 59,110 (66.4%)

=== 2002 general election ===
2002 general election: Dún Laoghaire
Party	Candidate	FPv%	Count										
Party	Candidate	FPv%	1	2	3	4	5	6	7	8	9	10	11
Fianna Fáil	Mary Hanafin	16.4	8,818	8,827	8,920	8,950							
Labour	Eamon Gilmore	15.4	8,271	8,284	8,297	8,343	8,375	8,414	8,762	8,942			
Fianna Fáil	Barry Andrews	13.8	7,425	7,431	7,449	7,459	7,483	7,519	7,676	7,742	8,289	8,367	8,918
Progressive Democrats	Fiona O'Malley	13.4	7,166	7,171	7,188	7,217	7,260	7,309	7,498	7,577	7,707	8,259	9,264
Green	Ciarán Cuffe	9.3	5,002	5,012	5,033	5,108	5,177	5,306	5,695	5,799	6,599	6,918	8,670
Labour	Niamh Bhreathnach	7.3	3,893	3,899	3,900	3,935	3,970	4,002	4,102	4,247	4,550	5,090	
Fine Gael	Helen Keogh	6.0	3,229	3,230	3,233	3,252	3,272	3,288	3,342	3,869	3,916		
Fine Gael	Liam T. Cosgrave	5.9	3,135	3,137	3,153	3,167	3,181	3,205	3,272	3,911	3,996	6,326	7,530
Sinn Féin	Michael O'Brien	4.0	2,159	2,160	2,173	2,176	2,192	2,205	2,405	2,421			
Fine Gael	John Bailey	3.2	1,705	1,706	1,712	1,720	1,735	1,745	1,795				
Socialist Workers	Richard Boyd Barrett	1.6	876	878	880	890	916	932					
Independent	Patrick O'Keefe	1.1	593	596	614	628	684	724					
Independent	Vincent MacDowell	0.6	345	354	369	394	418						
Independent	Denis O'Buachalla	0.7	346	353	361	380							
Ind. Health Alliance	Heather Williams	0.6	319	323	338								
Christian Solidarity	Michael Redmond	0.5	265	267									
Independent	Barbara Hyland	0.2	86										
Electorate: 91,522 Valid: 53,633 Spoilt: 438 (0.8%) Quota: 8,939 Turnout: 54,071 (59.1%)

=== 1997 general election ===
1997 general election: Dún Laoghaire
Party	Candidate	FPv%	Count						
Party	Candidate	FPv%	1	2	3	4	5	6	7
Fine Gael	Seán Barrett	17.0	9,223						
Fianna Fáil	David Andrews	16.5	8,933	8,940	9,195				
Fine Gael	Monica Barnes	13.9	7,576	7,701	7,945	8,145	8,778	8,801	9,857
Democratic Left	Eamon Gilmore	13.9	7,534	7,551	7,819	8,000	8,949	8,967	9,381
Fianna Fáil	Mary Hanafin	9.4	5,079	5,080	5,245	6,198	6,591	6,668	9,584
Labour	Niamh Bhreathnach	8.6	4,698	4,719	4,876	4,947	5,500	5,509	5,846
Progressive Democrats	Helen Keogh	8.6	4,636	4,640	4,800	4,975	5,400	5,425	
Green	Vincent MacDowell	5.1	2,762	2,764	3,139	3,454			
Christian Solidarity	Gerard Casey	3.7	2,000	2,002	2,093				
Independent	Paddy Madigan	2.0	1,082	1,083					
Independent	Olaf Tyaransen	0.6	348	348					
Independent	Jog Monster Raving Looney Abum	0.5	288	288					
Independent	Hazel Allshire-Tyrrell	0.1	53	53					
Independent	Rory Stokes	0.1	41	41					
Electorate: 87,994 Valid: 54,253 Spoilt: 393 (0.7%) Quota: 9,043 Turnout: 54,646 (62.1%)

=== 1992 general election ===
1992 general election: Dún Laoghaire
Party	Candidate	FPv%	Count											
Party	Candidate	FPv%	1	2	3	4	5	6	7	8	9	10	11	12
Fianna Fáil	David Andrews	22.6	13,418											
Labour	Niamh Bhreathnach	17.0	10,074											
Democratic Left	Eamon Gilmore	11.9	7,045	7,263	7,269	7,304	7,558	7,731	7,799	8,480	8,761	9,012	9,429	9,788
Progressive Democrats	Helen Keogh	10.9	6,497	6,708	6,709	6,719	6,735	6,828	6,856	7,235	7,416	7,760	8,856	10,038
Fine Gael	Seán Barrett	8.2	4,852	5,095	5,097	5,102	5,138	5,239	5,256	5,376	5,523	7,567	11,590	
Fine Gael	Monica Barnes	7.2	4,261	4,456	4,461	4,465	4,479	4,514	4,545	4,779	4,971	6,068		
Fine Gael	Liam T. Cosgrave	6.2	3,683	3,802	3,803	3,804	3,819	4,196	4,207	4,316	4,422			
Fianna Fáil	Brian Hillery	5.0	2,973	4,146	4,151	4,153	4,237	4,625	4,629	4,772	7,254	7,602	7,757	7,910
Fianna Fáil	Betty Coffey	3.6	2,119	3,346	3,350	3,355	3,446	3,533	3,538	3,688				
Green	Vincent MacDowell	3.0	1,784	1,849	1,863	1,882	2,035	2,323	2,337					
Independent	Michael Quinn	2.9	1,705	1,740	1,749	1,756	1,823							
Sinn Féin	Kevin Barry Fitzpatrick	1.4	801	831	832	849								
Workers' Party	Eamonn Murdock	0.2	110	115	115									
Independent	Martin Joseph McAneny	0.1	48	49										
Electorate: 87,495 Valid: 59,370 Spoilt: 679 (1.1%) Quota: 9,896 Turnout: 60,049 (68.6%)

=== 1989 general election ===
1989 general election: Dún Laoghaire
Party	Candidate	FPv%	Count										
Party	Candidate	FPv%	1	2	3	4	5	6	7	8	9	10	11
Fianna Fáil	David Andrews	19.0	9,980										
Fine Gael	Seán Barrett	13.2	6,940	6,990	6,993	7,022	7,070	7,282	7,514	7,584	7,750	11,002	
Workers' Party	Eamon Gilmore	12.8	6,729	6,769	6,777	7,141	7,348	8,417	9,379				
Fine Gael	Liam T. Cosgrave	10.4	5,448	5,472	5,482	5,511	5,550	5,680	5,834	5,910	6,021		
Fine Gael	Monica Barnes	9.1	4,786	4,817	4,825	4,829	4,914	5,162	5,663	5,839	6,034	7,634	9,506
Progressive Democrats	Geraldine Kennedy	9.0	4,710	4,735	4,743	4,755	4,821	5,050	5,660	5,861	6,049	6,629	6,958
Fianna Fáil	Brian Hillery	7.2	3,797	4,163	4,171	4,214	4,231	4,291	4,508	4,548	8,079	8,337	8,397
Fianna Fáil	Betty Coffey	6.4	3,330	3,994	3,998	4,090	4,121	4,214	4,469	4,522			
Green	Patricia Joan Griffin	5.1	2,686	2,700	2,739	2,911	3,017	3,298					
Labour	Flor O'Mahony	3.4	1,761	1,770	1,779	1,815	2,474						
Labour	Jane Dillon-Byrne	2.3	1,226	1,234	1,237	1,278							
Sinn Féin	Kevin Barry Fitzpatrick	1.8	940	948	951								
Independent	Ann McGoldrick	0.2	110	110									
Electorate: 81,169 Valid: 52,443 Quota: 8,741 Turnout: 64.6%

=== 1987 general election ===
1987 general election: Dún Laoghaire
Party	Candidate	FPv%	Count												
Party	Candidate	FPv%	1	2	3	4	5	6	7	8	9	10	11	12	13
Fianna Fáil	David Andrews	15.1	8,414	8,418	8,456	8,510	8,744	8,777	10,387						
Fine Gael	Seán Barrett	13.1	7,284	7,294	7,316	7,358	7,409	7,508	7,564	7,582	8,015	10,989			
Labour	Barry Desmond	11.6	6,484	6,500	6,525	6,742	6,828	6,897	6,979	7,012	8,555	8,935	9,043	9,575	
Progressive Democrats	Geraldine Kennedy	9.4	5,228	5,241	5,254	5,322	5,351	5,797	5,854	5,878	6,293	6,607	6,772	10,991	
Fine Gael	Monica Barnes	8.8	4,923	4,927	4,940	5,052	5,070	5,096	5,111	5,118	5,311	6,396	7,690	8,319	9,810
Fine Gael	Liam T. Cosgrave	8.7	4,870	4,879	4,893	4,930	4,959	4,998	5,040	5,048	5,290				
Progressive Democrats	Helen Keogh	7.5	4,203	4,211	4,223	4,292	4,307	5,173	5,214	5,230	5,475	5,704	5,824		
Workers' Party	Eamon Gilmore	7.3	4,054	4,070	4,087	4,260	4,740	4,779	4,847	4,872					
Fianna Fáil	Edward McDonald	5.9	3,265	3,270	3,279	3,317	3,431	3,445	4,469	5,441	6,285	6,413	6,431	6,572	6,788
Fianna Fáil	Richard Conroy	5.2	2,897	2,903	2,919	2,947	3,018	3,033							
Progressive Democrats	Larry Lohan	2.9	1,592	1,594	1,601	1,645	1,656								
Sinn Féin	Kevin Fitzpatrick	2.2	1,202	1,203	1,212	1,253									
Green	Ann McGoldrick	1.7	929	954	982										
Independent	Patrick O'Reilly	0.4	233	236											
Independent	Barbara Hyland	0.2	124												
Electorate: 77,325 Valid: 55,702 Quota: 9,284 Turnout: 72.0%

=== November 1982 general election ===
November 1982 general election: Dún Laoghaire
Party	Candidate	FPv%	Count						
Party	Candidate	FPv%	1	2	3	4	5	6	7
Fine Gael	Monica Barnes	20.2	10,115						
Fine Gael	Seán Barrett	19.0	9,511						
Fianna Fáil	David Andrews	15.2	7,643	7,659	7,691	7,719	7,735	8,048	8,324
Fine Gael	Liam T. Cosgrave	13.4	6,732	8,191	9,131				
Labour	Barry Desmond	12.2	6,130	6,349	6,483	7,128	7,176	7,246	8,941
Fianna Fáil	Martin O'Donoghue	8.1	4,053	4,061	4,073	4,090	4,101	4,308	4,467
Fianna Fáil	Valerie Goulding	5.0	2,492	2,502	2,509	2,523	2,533	2,815	2,975
Workers' Party	Eamon Gilmore	2.7	1,368	1,376	1,386	1,405	1,463	1,492	
Democratic Socialist	John de Courcy Ireland	2.1	1,036	1,057	1,063	1,091	1,140	1,146	
Fianna Fáil	Owen Hammond	1.8	893	894	896	901	918		
Independent	Anthony Clarke	0.4	205	214	218	229			
Electorate: 70,819 Valid: 50,178 Quota: 8,364 Turnout: 70.8%

=== February 1982 general election ===
February 1982 general election: Dún Laoghaire
Party	Candidate	FPv%	Count								
Party	Candidate	FPv%	1	2	3	4	5	6	7	8	9
Fine Gael	Seán Barrett	23.0	11,157								
Fianna Fáil	David Andrews	16.4	7,931	7,999	8,010	8,019	8,026	8,135			
Labour	Barry Desmond	16.0	7,776	8,209							
Fine Gael	Liam T. Cosgrave	14.9	7,202	8,605							
Fianna Fáil	Martin O'Donoghue	14.3	6,944	6,973	6,978	6,983	6,992	7,030	7,110	7,324	8,259
Fine Gael	Monica Barnes	10.4	5,021	6,133	6,625	6,727	6,737	6,784	6,954	7,177	7,242
Fianna Fáil	Clare Ó Méalóid	2.0	945	950	952	953	958	983	1,011	1,094	
Irish Republican Socialist	Osgur Breatnach	1.2	574	584	587	588	764	781	921		
Independent	Ubi Dwyer	0.9	418	422	424	425	439	501			
Independent	Martin Donohoe	0.7	318	3222	325	328	332				
Irish Republican Socialist	Marion Kennedy	0.5	225	228	229	230					
Electorate: 69,091 Valid: 48,511 Quota: 8,086 Turnout: 70.2%

=== 1981 general election ===
1981 general election: Dún Laoghaire
Party	Candidate	FPv%	Count									
Party	Candidate	FPv%	1	2	3	4	5	6	7	8	9	10
Fianna Fáil	David Andrews	19.7	9,471									
Fine Gael	Seán Barrett	17.0	8,207									
Fine Gael	Liam T. Cosgrave	15.2	7,296	7,334	7,355	7,427	7,462	7,532	7,585	7,654	8,512	
Fianna Fáil	Martin O'Donoghue	12.6	6,045	6680	6717	6720	6751	6850	7659	7750	7830	7,855
Labour	Barry Desmond	12.3	5,935	6,022	6,192	6,212	6,658	6,920	7,077	8,095		
Fine Gael	Monica Barnes	7.8	3,739	3,776	3,794	3,847	3,893	3,983	4,013	4,223	5,097	5,548
Fine Gael	Aine Elliott	3.5	1,674	1,682	1,690	1,711	1,731	1,796	1,812	1,923		
Fianna Fáil	William Harvey	2.6	1,270	1,436	1,441	1,442	1,451	1,485				
Fianna Fáil	Hazel Boland	2.6	1,244	1,681	1,701	1,703	1,723	1,778	2,142	2,183	2,226	2,233
Labour	Jane Dillon Byrne	2.1	1,026	1,036	1,193	1,195	1,376	1,609	1,625			
Independent	Ubi Dwyer	1.9	927	933	1,002	1,003	1,030					
Labour	Frank Smyth	1.6	761	772	831	834						
Socialist Labour	Dermot Boucher	1.2	575	582								
Electorate: 69,091 Valid: 48,170 Quota: 8,029 Turnout: 69.7%

=== 1977 general election ===
1977 general election: Dún Laoghaire
Party	Candidate	FPv%	Count						
Party	Candidate	FPv%	1	2	3	4	5	6	7
Fine Gael	Liam Cosgrave	28.9	11,024						
Fianna Fáil	David Andrews	23.0	8,754						
Labour	Barry Desmond	12.2	4,642	5,235	5,296	6,001	6,081	6,503	8,015
Fianna Fáil	Martin O'Donoghue	10.8	4,099	4,140	4,555	4,593	6,897	6,946	7,936
Independent	Una O'Higgins-O'Malley	8.7	3,305	3,412	3,438	3,561	3,681	3,884	
Fianna Fáil	John O'Connor	5.2	1,984	2,017	2,606	2,649			
Fine Gael	Michael Carroll	4.7	1,791	2,964	2,993	3,048	3,096	5,316	6,117
Fine Gael	Percy Dockrell	3.9	1,472	2,886	2,896	2,950	2,986		
Labour	Jack Loughran	2.4	898	948	960				
Independent	Frank Stein	0.2	86	87	87				
Electorate: 54,064 Valid: 38,055 Quota: 7,612 Turnout: 70.4%

== See also ==
- Elections in the Republic of Ireland
- Politics of the Republic of Ireland
- List of Dáil by-elections
- List of political parties in the Republic of Ireland
