= Seán Barrett (politician) =

Irish politician (1944–2026)

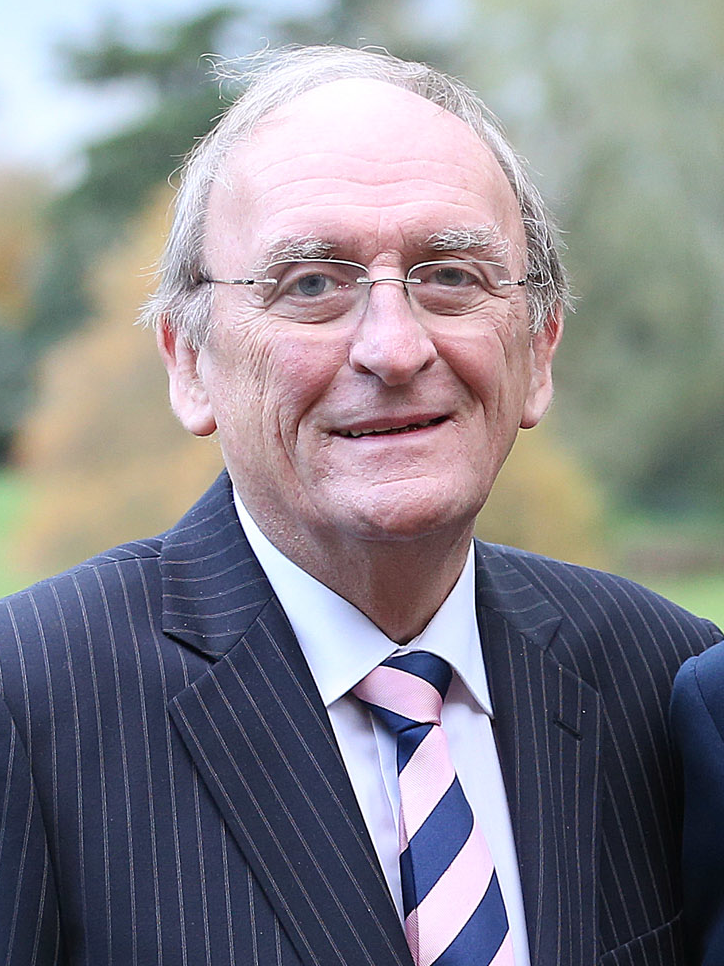
- Barrett in 2015

Ceann Comhairle of Dáil Éireann
- In office 9 March 2011 – 10 March 2016
- Deputy: Michael P. Kitt
- Preceded by: Séamus Kirk
- Succeeded by: Seán Ó Fearghaíl

Minister for Defence
- In office 23 May 1995 – 26 June 1997
- Taoiseach: John Bruton
- Preceded by: Hugh Coveney
- Succeeded by: David Andrews

Minister for the Marine
- In office 23 May 1995 – 26 June 1997
- Taoiseach: John Bruton
- Preceded by: Hugh Coveney
- Succeeded by: David Andrews

Minister of State
- 1994–1995: Government Chief Whip
- 1994–1995: Defence
- 1986–1987: Education
- 1982–1986: Government Chief Whip
- 1982–1986: Defence

Teachta Dála
- In office May 2007 – February 2020
- In office June 1981 – May 2002
- Constituency: Dún Laoghaire

Personal details
- Born: 9 August 1944 Killiney, Dublin, Ireland
- Died: 6 April 2026 (aged 81)
- Party: Fine Gael
- Spouse: Sheila Hyde (m. 1968)
- Children: 5
- Education: University College Dublin

Seán Barrett (9 August 1944 – 6 April 2026) was an Irish Fine Gael politician who served as Ceann Comhairle of Dáil Éireann from 2011 to 2016, Minister for Defence and Minister for the Marine from 1995 to 1997, and a Minister of State from 1982 to 1987 and 1994 to 1995. He served as a Teachta Dála (TD) for Dún Laoghaire from 1981 to 2002 and 2007 to 2020.

== Background ==
Barrettt was born in Killiney, Dublin, Ireland on 9 August 1944. He was educated at CBS Dún Laoghaire, C.B.C. Monkstown and Presentation Brothers College in Glasthule, County Dublin. Before he entered politics, Barrett was a partner in a successful Dublin-based insurance brokerage firm (Barrett, Hegarty, Moloney Limited, established in 1979). A fan of horse-racing, in 1987, he also established Seán Barrett Bloodstock Insurances Ltd.

He was married to Sheila Hyde for 58 years, and they had five children. Barrett died on 6 April 2026, at the age of 81.

== Political career ==
Barrett first became involved in local politics, serving on Dublin County Council for the local electoral area of Ballybrack from 1974 until 1982.

At the 1977 general election, Barrett stood as a Fine Gael candidate in Dublin County South, but failed to win a seat. He was first elected to Dáil Éireann when he stood in the Dún Laoghaire constituency at the 1981 general election, where he was returned at each subsequent election until his retirement at the 2002 general election.

In December 1982, Garret FitzGerald became Taoiseach for the second time and Barrett was appointed Minister of State at the Department of the Taoiseach (as Government Chief Whip) and Minister of State at the Department of Defence. Between February 1986 and March 1987, he served as Leader of the House with responsibility for Dáil Reform and Minister of State at the Department of Education with responsibility for sport.

He was elected at the 1991 Dún Laoghaire–Rathdown County Council election for the local electoral area of Glencullen (serving on Dublin County Council until its abolition on 1 January 1994).

John Bruton's Rainbow Coalition came to office in 1994 and Barrett was again appointed as Government Chief Whip, Minister of State at the Department of the Taoiseach and Minister of State at the Department of Defence. In 1995, Hugh Coveney resigned from the cabinet and Barrett was then appointed Minister for Defence and Minister for the Marine. During his tenure Barrett dealt with the army deafness compensation issue that ultimately resulted in claims of approximately €300 million (equivalent to €455.74 million in 2023) against the State. Barrett's short ministerial career was blighted by critical remarks from Garda and army officers directed towards the Minister. His term as minister ended when the government lost office following the 1997 general election.

In 1999, he announced that he would not contest the next election, saying "at this stage, I believe it is time to make way for the next generation who must be given the chance to make their own contribution."

When Barrett, Liam T. Cosgrave and Monica Barnes were each first elected in 1981, Fine Gael secured three of the five seats and 48% of the first preference vote in Dún Laoghaire. But this significant vote waned over the following years and when Barrett and Barnes retired at the 2002 general election, Fine Gael failed to win a seat in Dún Laoghaire.

=== Return to politics ===
In February 2006, Barrett announced that he wanted to come back from retirement, and stand again as a Fine Gael candidate at the next general election. He insisted that he would stand only if selected by the local party members, and would not accept being imposed as a candidate by Fine Gael headquarters.

At a selection meeting in Dalkey in May 2006, Barrett and barrister Eugene Regan were chosen as Fine Gael's two candidates in the Dún Laoghaire constituency. At the 2007 general election, Barrett was the fourth candidate returned to the 30th Dáil for Dún Laoghaire and Regan was not elected.

Barrett was appointed Chairperson of the Oireachtas Joint Committee on Climate Change and Energy Security. He was promoted to Fine Gael Spokesperson on Foreign Affairs in a front bench reshuffle following an attempted heave against Enda Kenny.

=== Ceann Comhairle ===
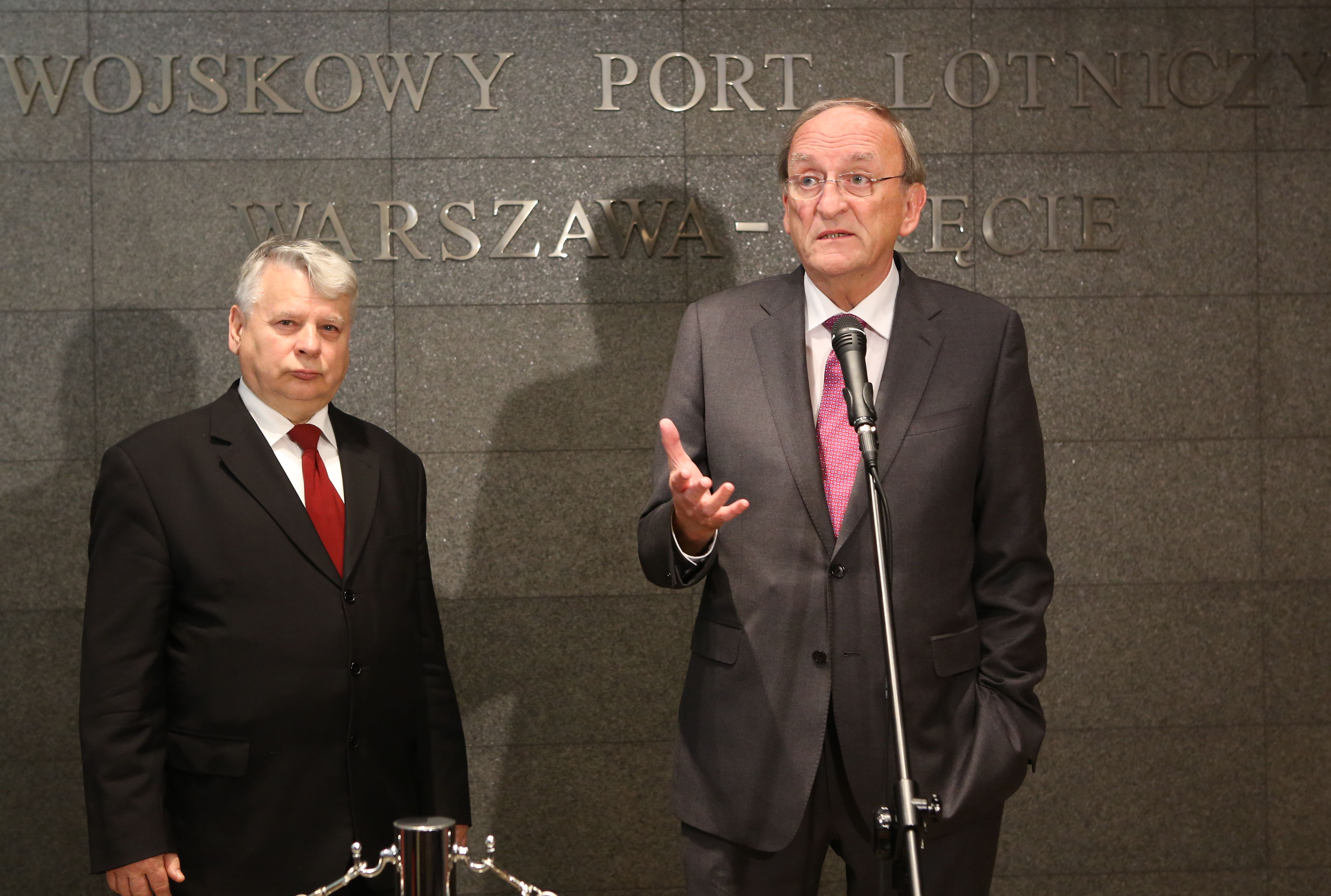
Barrett (right) with Bogdan Borusewicz in Warsaw (2014)

Following the 2011 general election, he was elected on 9 March as Ceann Comhairle of the 31st Dáil.

Barrett met Chinese President Xi Jinping in 2013.

He was returned to the 32nd Dáil automatically at the 2016 general election, and did not contest the 2020 general election.

== Mahon Tribunal ==
A report in The Irish Times in July 2006 said that a representative of Fine Gael had described the Mahon Tribunal "as an outrage and a disgrace" for allowing unfounded allegations to be made against Barrett. Fine Gael, through its solicitor, expressed regret to the Tribunal on 25 July for this remark, describing it as 'inappropriate'.

Political offices
Preceded by Bertie Ahern	Government Chief Whip; 1982–1986	Succeeded by Fergus O'Brien
Preceded by Bertie Ahern	Minister of State at the Department of Defence; 1982–1986	Succeeded by Fergus O'Brien
Preceded by Donal Creed	Minister of State at the Department of Education; 1986–1987	Succeeded by Frank Fahey
Preceded by Noel Dempsey	Government Chief Whip; 1994–1995	Succeeded by Jim Higgins
Preceded by Noel Dempsey	Minister of State at the Department of Defence; 1994–1995	Succeeded by Jim Higgins
Preceded by Hugh Coveney	Minister for Defence; 1995–1997	Succeeded by David Andrews
Preceded by Hugh Coveney	Minister for the Marine; 1995–1997	Succeeded by Michael Woods
Preceded by Séamus Kirk	Ceann Comhairle of Dáil Éireann; 2011–2016	Succeeded by Seán Ó Fearghaíl

Dáil	Election	Deputy (Party)	Deputy (Party)	Deputy (Party)	Deputy (Party)	Deputy (Party)
21st	1977	David Andrews (FF)	Liam Cosgrave (FG)	Barry Desmond (Lab)	Martin O'Donoghue (FF)	4 seats 1977–1981
22nd	1981	David Andrews (FF)	Liam T. Cosgrave (FG)	Barry Desmond (Lab)	Martin O'Donoghue (FF)	Seán Barrett (FG)
23rd	1982 (Feb)	David Andrews (FF)	Liam T. Cosgrave (FG)	Barry Desmond (Lab)	Martin O'Donoghue (FF)	Seán Barrett (FG)
24th	1982 (Nov)	David Andrews (FF)	Liam T. Cosgrave (FG)	Barry Desmond (Lab)	Monica Barnes (FG)	Seán Barrett (FG)
25th	1987	David Andrews (FF)	Geraldine Kennedy (PDs)	Barry Desmond (Lab)	Monica Barnes (FG)	Seán Barrett (FG)
26th	1989	David Andrews (FF)	Brian Hillery (FF)	Eamon Gilmore (WP)	Monica Barnes (FG)	Seán Barrett (FG)
27th	1992	David Andrews (FF)	Helen Keogh (PDs)	Eamon Gilmore (DL)	Niamh Bhreathnach (Lab)	Seán Barrett (FG)
28th	1997	David Andrews (FF)	Monica Barnes (FG)	Eamon Gilmore (Lab)	Mary Hanafin (FF)	Seán Barrett (FG)
29th	2002	Barry Andrews (FF)	Fiona O'Malley (PDs)	Eamon Gilmore (Lab)	Mary Hanafin (FF)	Ciarán Cuffe (GP)
30th	2007	Barry Andrews (FF)	Seán Barrett (Note: Served as Ceann Comhairle in the 31st Dáil from 2011 to 2016 and was returned automatically at the 2016 general election.) (FG)	Eamon Gilmore (Lab)	Mary Hanafin (FF)	Ciarán Cuffe (GP)
31st	2011	Mary Mitchell O'Connor (FG)	Seán Barrett (FG)	Eamon Gilmore (Lab)	Richard Boyd Barrett (PBP)	4 seats from 2011
32nd	2016	Mary Mitchell O'Connor (FG)	Seán Barrett (FG)	Maria Bailey (FG)	Richard Boyd Barrett (AAA–PBP)	4 seats from 2011
33rd	2020	Jennifer Carroll MacNeill (FG)	Ossian Smyth (GP)	Cormac Devlin (FF)	Richard Boyd Barrett (S–PBP)	4 seats from 2011
34th	2024	Jennifer Carroll MacNeill (FG)	Barry Ward (FG)	Cormac Devlin (FF)	Richard Boyd Barrett (PBP–S)	4 seats from 2011
