= 2004 Dún Laoghaire–Rathdown County Council election =

Local election in Ireland

- 11 June 2004

All 28 seats on Dún Laoghaire–Rathdown County Council
	First party	Second party	Third party
Party	Fine Gael	Fianna Fáil	Labour
Seats won	9	7	6
Seat change	+1	-3	-
	Fourth party	Fifth party	Sixth party
Party	Green	Progressive Democrats	Independent
Seats won	4	1	1
Seat change	+3	-2	+1
- Map showing the area of Dún Laoghaire–Rathdown County Council
Council control after election
TBD

An election to Dún Laoghaire–Rathdown County Council took place on 11 June 2004 as part of that year's Irish local elections. 28 councillors were elected from six local electoral areas (LEAs) for a five-year term of office on the electoral system of proportional representation by means of the single transferable vote (PR-STV).

== Results by party ==
Party	Seats	±	First Pref. votes	FPv%	±%
Fine Gael	9	+1	19,613	24.06	
Fianna Fáil	7	-3	20,267	24.86	
Labour	6	-	16,549	20.30	
Green	4	+3	8,432	10.34	
Progressive Democrats	1	-2	6,851	8.40	
Independent	1	+1	3,621	4.44	
Totals	28	-	81,517	100.00	—

== Results by local electoral area ==
=== Ballybrack ===
Ballybrack - 6 seats
Party	Candidate	FPv%	Count				
Party	Candidate	FPv%	1	2	3	4	5
Fine Gael	Donal Marren*	14.59	2,469				
Labour	Denis O'Callaghan*	13.81	2,337	2,421			
Fianna Fáil	Larry Butler*	12.38	2,094	2,110	2,783		
Fine Gael	Maria Bailey	12.15	2,055	2,070	2,224	2,326	2,432
Labour	Carrie Smyth*	11.81	1,998	2,040	2,190	2,237	2,662
Green	Tom Kivlehan	8.98	1,519	1,604	1,657	1,700	2,085
Progressive Democrats	Dr. Mazhar Bari	8.33	1,410	764	779	806	808
Fianna Fáil	Bernie Lowe*	7.68	1,299	1,041	1,059	1,101	1,102
Sinn Féin	Mick Nolan	7.53	1,274	706	746	765	767
Socialist Workers	Dave Lordan	2.74	464	282	300		
Electorate: 33,550 Valid: 16,919 (50.43%) Spoilt: 375 Quota: 2,418 Turnout: 17,294 (51.55%)

=== Blackrock ===
Blackrock - 4 seats
Party	Candidate	FPv%	Count					
Party	Candidate	FPv%	1	2	3	4	5	6
Labour	Niamh Bhreathnach*	23.40	2,738					
Fine Gael	Marie Baker	18.61	2,177	2,254	2,423			
Progressive Democrats	Victor Boyhan*	12.25	1,433	1,467	1,540	1,553	1,694	2,074
Fianna Fáil	Barry Conway*	11.91	1,393	1,423	1,456	1,459	2,124	2,319
Green	Nessa Childers	10.50	1,229	1,293	1,572	1,607	1,721	2,113
Fianna Fáil	Lorcan Mooney	9.26	1,083	1,108	1,138	1,141		
Fine Gael	William Dockrell*	9.06	1,060	1,091	1,137	1,165	1,247	
Labour	Angela Timlin	5.02	587	723				
Electorate: 22,665 Valid: 11,700 (51.62%) Spoilt: 236 Quota: 2,341 Turnout: 11,936 (52.66%)

=== Dundrum ===
Dundrum - 6 seats
Party	Candidate	FPv%	Count									
Party	Candidate	FPv%	1	2	3	4	5	6	7	8	9	10
Labour	Aidan Culhane*	12.74	2,216	2,271	2,338	2,418	2,575					
Fianna Fáil	Tony Fox*	12.20	2,121	2,156	2,258	2,377	2,598					
Green	Ciaran Fallon	12.08	2,101	2,219	2,352	2,537						
Fine Gael	Jim O'Leary	10.64	1,850	1,942	1,986	2,015	2,205	2,216	2,237	2,241	2,525	
Fianna Fáil	Trevor Matthews*	8.71	1,515	1,541	1,582	1,616	1,723	1,760	1,768	1,774	2,538	
Fianna Fáil	Tony Kelly*	8.67	1,508	1,534	1,554	1,601	1,682	1,722	1,732	1,737		
Fine Gael	Pat Hand*	8.42	1,465	1,535	1,570	1,602	1,768	1,790	1,829	1,836	2,031	2,075
Socialist Party	Lisa Maher	7.40	1,287	1,311	1,448	1,757	1,814	1,817	1,829	1,859	1,982	1,991
Progressive Democrats	Mary Fitzpatrick	5.96	1,037	1,069	1,103	1,134						
Sinn Féin	Ray O'Kelly	5.63	979	1,003	1,075							
Independent	Michael Langsdorf	3.84	667	759								
Independent	Seamus O'Neill	3.71	645									
Electorate: 32,053 Valid: 17,391 (54.26%) Spoilt: 413 Quota: 2,485 Turnout: 17,804 (55.55%)

=== Dún Laoghaire ===
Dún Laoghaire - 6 seats
Party	Candidate	FPv%	Count							
Party	Candidate	FPv%	1	2	3	4	5	6	7	8
Fine Gael	John Bailey	12.08	2,189	2,222	2,268	2,500	2,603			
Progressive Democrats	Mary Mitchell O'Connor	11.14	2,018	2,100	2,142	2,282	2,360	2,576	2,771	
Fine Gael	Eugene Regan	10.80	1,957	1,994	2,012	2,454	2,499	2,585	2,679	
Fianna Fáil	Cormac Devlin	9.80	1,776	1,981	2,012	2,067	2,205	3,118		
Green	Kealin Ireland*	9.75	1,767	1,795	1,858	1,920	2,313	2,397	2,469	2,497
Socialist Workers	Richard Boyd Barrett	7.94	1,439	1,450	1,502	1,527				
Labour	Chris O'Malley*	7.84	1,420	1,444	1,655	1,751	1,967	2,082	2,124	2,167
Fianna Fáil	Brendan Kiely	7.72	1,399	1,626	1,642	1,664	1,736			
Labour	Jane Dillon-Byrne*	7.43	1,346	1,364	1,748	1,816	2,117	2,207	2,274	2,288
Fine Gael	Tom O'Higgins	6.38	1,156	1,179	1,201					
Labour	Roger Cole	4.99	905	914						
Fianna Fáil	Eimear McAuliffe	4.14	750							
Electorate: 34,737 Valid: 18,122 (52.17%) Spoilt: 449 Quota: 2,589 Turnout: 18,571 (53.46%)

=== Glencullen ===
Glencullen - 3 seats
Party	Candidate	FPv%	Count				
Party	Candidate	FPv%	1	2	3	4	5
Labour	Lettie McCarthy	22.94	1,941	2,112	2,670		
Fianna Fáil	Maria Corrigan*	21.42	1,812	1,899	2,086	2,171	
Fianna Fáil	Tom Murphy*	19.23	1,627	1,700	1,796	1,844	1,864
Fine Gael	Tom Joyce*	15.26	1,333	1,385	1,628	1,865	1,881
Green	Terence Corish	11.89	1,006	1,228			
Sinn Féin	Joe Comerford	8.76	741				
Electorate: 15,898 Valid: 8,460 (53.21%) Spoilt: 173 Quota: 2,116 Turnout: 8,633 (54.30%)

=== Stillorgan ===
Stillorgan - 3 seats
Party	Candidate	FPv%	Count					
Party	Candidate	FPv%	1	2	3	4	5	6
Independent	Gearóid O'Keeffe	26.04	2,309					
Fianna Fáil	Gerry Horkan*	16.74	1,497	1,730	1,748	1,831	1,900	2,262
Labour	Margaret McCluskey	8.70	1,061	1,078	1,093	1,421	1,523	1,764
Fine Gael	Louise Cosgrave*	17.03	1,039	1,070	1,084	1,208	1,800	2,210
Progressive Democrats	Barry Saul*	10.65	953	993	1,013	1,112	1,236	
Fine Gael	Shane Molloy	9.65	863	887	898	942		
Green	Simon Curtis	9.06	810	824	838			
Fianna Fáil	Mary White	4.39	393					
Electorate: 15,589 Valid: 8,945 (57.38%) Spoilt: 161 Quota: 2,237 Turnout: 9,106 (58.41%)
