= Helen Keogh =

Irish former politician (born 1951)

Senator
- In office 17 September 1997 – 12 September 2002
- In office 1 November 1989 – 25 November 1992
- Constituency: Nominated by the Taoiseach

Teachta Dála
- In office November 1992 – June 1997
- Constituency: Dún Laoghaire

Personal details
- Born: 3 June 1951 (age 75) Cork, Ireland
- Party: Fine Gael (until 1985, since 2000)
- Other political affiliations: Progressive Democrats (1985–2000)
- Education: University College Dublin

Helen Catherine Anne Keogh (born 3 June 1951) is an Irish businesswoman, and former Progressive Democrats and Fine Gael politician who was Chief Executive of World Vision Ireland from 2003 until May 2018. She previously served as a Senator from 1989 to 1992 and 1997 to 2002 and a Teachta Dála (TD) for the Dún Laoghaire constituency from 1992 to 1997.

A former teacher, guidance counsellor and businesswoman, Keogh was an unsuccessful Progressive Democrats candidate at the 1987 general election, the first election after the party was founded. She did not contest the 1989 general election but was nominated as a member of the 19th Seanad by Taoiseach Charles Haughey.

She was elected to Dáil Éireann as a Progressive Democrats TD for the Dún Laoghaire constituency at the 1992 general election. She lost her seat at the 1997 general election to Monica Barnes of Fine Gael. She was then nominated by Taoiseach Bertie Ahern to the 21st Seanad.

Keogh was elected to Dún Laoghaire–Rathdown County Council in 1991 and re-elected in 1999, serving until 2004. She joined Fine Gael in 2000 and unsuccessfully stood for election in both the 2002 general election and the 2002 Seanad election. She ran unsuccessfully for the Seanad for the National University of Ireland constituency in 2011.

She was appointed chairperson of the board of Dóchas, the Irish Association of Non-Governmental Development Organisations, in 2006 and was elected for a second term of office in 2008. She became Chief Executive of World Vision Ireland from 2003 until May 2018. She was on the board of Pobal as the Chairperson of the Audit, Finance and Risk Committee, from 2013 till she retired in June 2022.

Dáil	Election	Deputy (Party)	Deputy (Party)	Deputy (Party)	Deputy (Party)	Deputy (Party)
21st	1977	David Andrews (FF)	Liam Cosgrave (FG)	Barry Desmond (Lab)	Martin O'Donoghue (FF)	4 seats 1977–1981
22nd	1981	David Andrews (FF)	Liam T. Cosgrave (FG)	Barry Desmond (Lab)	Martin O'Donoghue (FF)	Seán Barrett (FG)
23rd	1982 (Feb)	David Andrews (FF)	Liam T. Cosgrave (FG)	Barry Desmond (Lab)	Martin O'Donoghue (FF)	Seán Barrett (FG)
24th	1982 (Nov)	David Andrews (FF)	Liam T. Cosgrave (FG)	Barry Desmond (Lab)	Monica Barnes (FG)	Seán Barrett (FG)
25th	1987	David Andrews (FF)	Geraldine Kennedy (PDs)	Barry Desmond (Lab)	Monica Barnes (FG)	Seán Barrett (FG)
26th	1989	David Andrews (FF)	Brian Hillery (FF)	Eamon Gilmore (WP)	Monica Barnes (FG)	Seán Barrett (FG)
27th	1992	David Andrews (FF)	Helen Keogh (PDs)	Eamon Gilmore (DL)	Niamh Bhreathnach (Lab)	Seán Barrett (FG)
28th	1997	David Andrews (FF)	Monica Barnes (FG)	Eamon Gilmore (Lab)	Mary Hanafin (FF)	Seán Barrett (FG)
29th	2002	Barry Andrews (FF)	Fiona O'Malley (PDs)	Eamon Gilmore (Lab)	Mary Hanafin (FF)	Ciarán Cuffe (GP)
30th	2007	Barry Andrews (FF)	Seán Barrett (Note: Served as Ceann Comhairle in the 31st Dáil from 2011 to 2016 and was returned automatically at the 2016 general election.) (FG)	Eamon Gilmore (Lab)	Mary Hanafin (FF)	Ciarán Cuffe (GP)
31st	2011	Mary Mitchell O'Connor (FG)	Seán Barrett (FG)	Eamon Gilmore (Lab)	Richard Boyd Barrett (PBP)	4 seats from 2011
32nd	2016	Mary Mitchell O'Connor (FG)	Seán Barrett (FG)	Maria Bailey (FG)	Richard Boyd Barrett (AAA–PBP)	4 seats from 2011
33rd	2020	Jennifer Carroll MacNeill (FG)	Ossian Smyth (GP)	Cormac Devlin (FF)	Richard Boyd Barrett (S–PBP)	4 seats from 2011
34th	2024	Jennifer Carroll MacNeill (FG)	Barry Ward (FG)	Cormac Devlin (FF)	Richard Boyd Barrett (PBP–S)	4 seats from 2011
