= Martin O'Donoghue =

Irish politician (1933–2018)

Minister for Education
- In office 9 March 1982 – 6 October 1982
- Taoiseach: Charles Haughey
- Preceded by: John Boland
- Succeeded by: Charles Haughey

Minister for Economic Planning and Development
- In office 8 July 1977 – 11 December 1979
- Taoiseach: Jack Lynch
- Preceded by: New office
- Succeeded by: Michael O'Kennedy

Minister without portfolio
- In office 5 July 1977 – 8 July 1977
- Taoiseach: Jack Lynch
- Preceded by: New office
- Succeeded by: Office abolished

Senator
- In office 23 February 1983 – 25 April 1987
- Constituency: Administrative Panel

Teachta Dála
- In office June 1977 – November 1982
- Constituency: Dún Laoghaire

Personal details
- Born: 19 May 1933 Crumlin, Dublin, Ireland
- Died: 20 July 2018 (aged 85) Dublin, Ireland
- Party: Fianna Fáil
- Spouse: Evelyn O'Donoghue (m. 1963)
- Children: 3
- Education: Trinity College Dublin

Martin O'Donoghue (19 May 1933 – 20 July 2018) was an Irish Fianna Fáil politician who served as Minister for Education from March 1982 to October 1982 and Minister for Economic Planning and Development from 1977 to 1979. He served as a Senator for the Labour Panel from 1983 to 1987. He also served as a Teachta Dála (TD) for the Dún Laoghaire constituency from 1977 to 1982.

He was one of a few TDs to be appointed a Minister on their first day in the Dáil.

== Life ==
O'Donoghue was born in Dublin in 1933. He was educated in Crumlin and worked as a waiter in Dublin, becoming a mature student at Trinity College Dublin and being awarded a Ph.D. in economics by Trinity College Dublin.

== Career ==
From 1962 to 1964 and from 1967 to 1969, he was economic consultant at the Departments of Education and Finance respectively. He was elected a Fellow of Trinity College Dublin in 1969 and promoted to associate professor of Economics there in 1970. Between 1970 and 1973, O'Donoghue was economic adviser to the Taoiseach Jack Lynch.

=== Politics ===
At the 1977 general election O'Donoghue was elected to Dáil Éireann as a Fianna Fáil TD for the Dún Laoghaire constituency. He was chief author of the election manifesto which saw Fianna Fáil achieve an unprecedented twenty-seat majority. O'Donoghue was appointed Minister for Economic Planning and Development on his first day in office as a TD, a new cabinet portfolio. (Note: O'Donoghue was a minister without portfolio from July to December 1977, pending the establishment of the new department.) In December 1979, Charles Haughey became Taoiseach and O'Donoghue was dropped from cabinet, with the functions of his former department merged into the Department of Finance. In March 1982, O'Donoghue returned to cabinet as Minister for Education. In October 1982, he and Des O'Malley refused to support Haughey in a leadership challenge and resigned from cabinet. At the November 1982 general election O'Donoghue lost his seat.

O'Donoghue was elected to the 17th Seanad in 1983. He resigned from the Fianna Fáil parliamentary party in February 1983 after leaked phone calls emerged of him being critical of Haughey while he was a cabinet minister. He later left Fianna Fáil, becoming a supporter of the Progressive Democrats, a party founded by Des O'Malley. He remained in the Seanad until 1987.

=== Later career ===
O'Donoghue returned to academia until his retirement in 1995. In 1998, he became a director of the Central Bank of Ireland, serving with this and its successor body until the end of April 2008. He was a Fellow of Trinity College Dublin and served on the board of the O'Reilly Foundation.

He died on 20 July 2018.

== Footnotes ==
Political offices
New office	Minister for Economic Planning and Development; 1977–1979	Succeeded by Michael O'Kennedy
Preceded by John Boland	Minister for Education; 1982	Succeeded by Charles Haughey (acting)

Dáil	Election	Deputy (Party)	Deputy (Party)	Deputy (Party)	Deputy (Party)	Deputy (Party)
21st	1977	David Andrews (FF)	Liam Cosgrave (FG)	Barry Desmond (Lab)	Martin O'Donoghue (FF)	4 seats 1977–1981
22nd	1981	David Andrews (FF)	Liam T. Cosgrave (FG)	Barry Desmond (Lab)	Martin O'Donoghue (FF)	Seán Barrett (FG)
23rd	1982 (Feb)	David Andrews (FF)	Liam T. Cosgrave (FG)	Barry Desmond (Lab)	Martin O'Donoghue (FF)	Seán Barrett (FG)
24th	1982 (Nov)	David Andrews (FF)	Liam T. Cosgrave (FG)	Barry Desmond (Lab)	Monica Barnes (FG)	Seán Barrett (FG)
25th	1987	David Andrews (FF)	Geraldine Kennedy (PDs)	Barry Desmond (Lab)	Monica Barnes (FG)	Seán Barrett (FG)
26th	1989	David Andrews (FF)	Brian Hillery (FF)	Eamon Gilmore (WP)	Monica Barnes (FG)	Seán Barrett (FG)
27th	1992	David Andrews (FF)	Helen Keogh (PDs)	Eamon Gilmore (DL)	Niamh Bhreathnach (Lab)	Seán Barrett (FG)
28th	1997	David Andrews (FF)	Monica Barnes (FG)	Eamon Gilmore (Lab)	Mary Hanafin (FF)	Seán Barrett (FG)
29th	2002	Barry Andrews (FF)	Fiona O'Malley (PDs)	Eamon Gilmore (Lab)	Mary Hanafin (FF)	Ciarán Cuffe (GP)
30th	2007	Barry Andrews (FF)	Seán Barrett (Note: Served as Ceann Comhairle in the 31st Dáil from 2011 to 2016 and was returned automatically at the 2016 general election.) (FG)	Eamon Gilmore (Lab)	Mary Hanafin (FF)	Ciarán Cuffe (GP)
31st	2011	Mary Mitchell O'Connor (FG)	Seán Barrett (FG)	Eamon Gilmore (Lab)	Richard Boyd Barrett (PBP)	4 seats from 2011
32nd	2016	Mary Mitchell O'Connor (FG)	Seán Barrett (FG)	Maria Bailey (FG)	Richard Boyd Barrett (AAA–PBP)	4 seats from 2011
33rd	2020	Jennifer Carroll MacNeill (FG)	Ossian Smyth (GP)	Cormac Devlin (FF)	Richard Boyd Barrett (S–PBP)	4 seats from 2011
34th	2024	Jennifer Carroll MacNeill (FG)	Barry Ward (FG)	Cormac Devlin (FF)	Richard Boyd Barrett (PBP–S)	4 seats from 2011
