= Eugene Regan =

Irish politician and judge (born 1952)

The Hon. Mr. Justice Eugene Regan
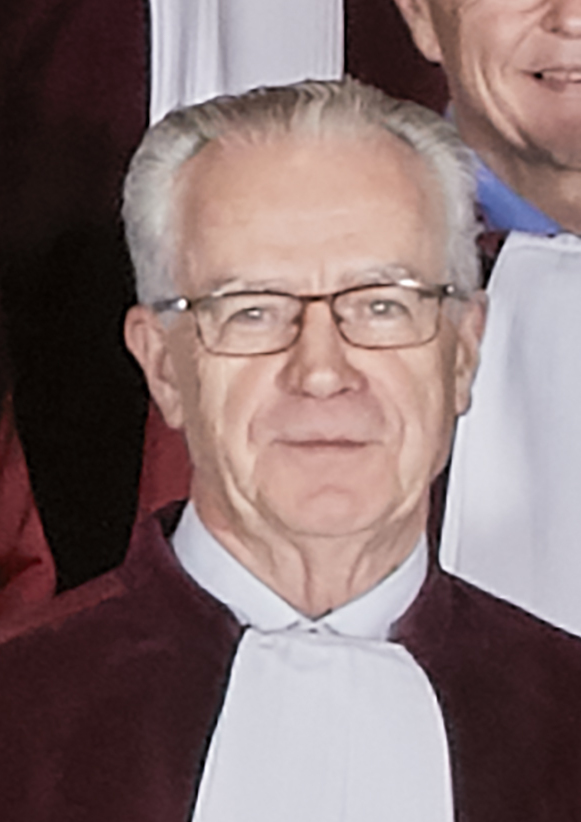

Judge of the European Court of Justice
- Incumbent
- Assumed office 7 October 2015
- Nominated by: Government of Ireland
- Appointed by: European Council

Senator
- In office 13 September 2007 – 25 May 2011
- Constituency: Agricultural Panel

Personal details
- Born: Eugene Alexander Regan; 12 June 1952 (age 74) Dalkey, Dublin, Ireland
- Party: Fine Gael
- Spouses: Kista Regan (m. 1982–2012); Janne Storgaard (m. 2017)
- Children: 2
- Education: University College Dublin; University of Brussels; King's Inns

Eugene Alexander Regan (born 12 June 1952) is an Irish judge who has served as a Judge of the European Court of Justice since October 2015. He previously served as a Senator for the Agricultural Panel from 2007 to 2011.

== Early and personal life ==
He was educated at University College Dublin, University of Brussels and King's Inns. Regan qualified as a barrister in 1985, commenced practice in 1995, and became a Senior Counsel in 2005. He specialises in European law cases, many with a competition, state aid, public procurement, or agricultural dimension.

During a career that began as an intern to Commissioner Patrick Hillery in 1973, Regan worked with Alan Dukes in the mid-1970s as an economist for the Irish Farmers' Association in Dublin and Brussels.

Regan served in the cabinet of Peter Sutherland when the latter was EU Commissioner for Social Affairs and Competition. Following his return to Ireland from Brussels, he spent eight years as general manager of Agra Trading, a Dublin-based company that trades agricultural produce internationally.

A pro-European, he has contributed to many publications on European law matters, both legal and media-related. He was also an advocate and campaigner in the Amsterdam Treaty and Treaty of Nice referendum campaigns.

He lives in Monkstown, Dublin with his Danish-born wife, Janne, and their two daughters.

== Political career ==
He was elected for the first time to Dún Laoghaire–Rathdown County Council on 11 June 2004, having spent more than €45,000 on his election. On his election to the Seanad, Regan was appointed by Enda Kenny as party Seanad spokesperson on Justice, Equality and Law Reform and was made a member of the Joint Committee on the Constitution and the Joint Committee on Justice, Equality, Defence and Women's Rights.

Regan, along with Seán Barrett and fellow Councillor John Bailey, were selected as Fine Gael candidates to stand at the 2007 general election in the Dún Laoghaire constituency. Only Barrett was elected for Fine Gael. Regan received the support of former Taoiseach Garret FitzGerald who intervened in a general election for the first time since leaving the Dáil in 1992. Support also came from Alan Dukes and Peter Sutherland. Regan served as Cathaoirleach of Dún Laoghaire–Rathdown County Council from 2006 to 2007. He was elected to the Seanad on the Agricultural Panel on 24 July 2007.

He is known for bringing the issue of the Willie O'Dea affidavit incident to the attention of the Oireachtas which led to O'Dea's resignation as Minister of Defence.

He did not contest the 2011 Seanad election.
