= Cormac Devlin =

Irish politician (born 1980)

Cormac Devlin TD
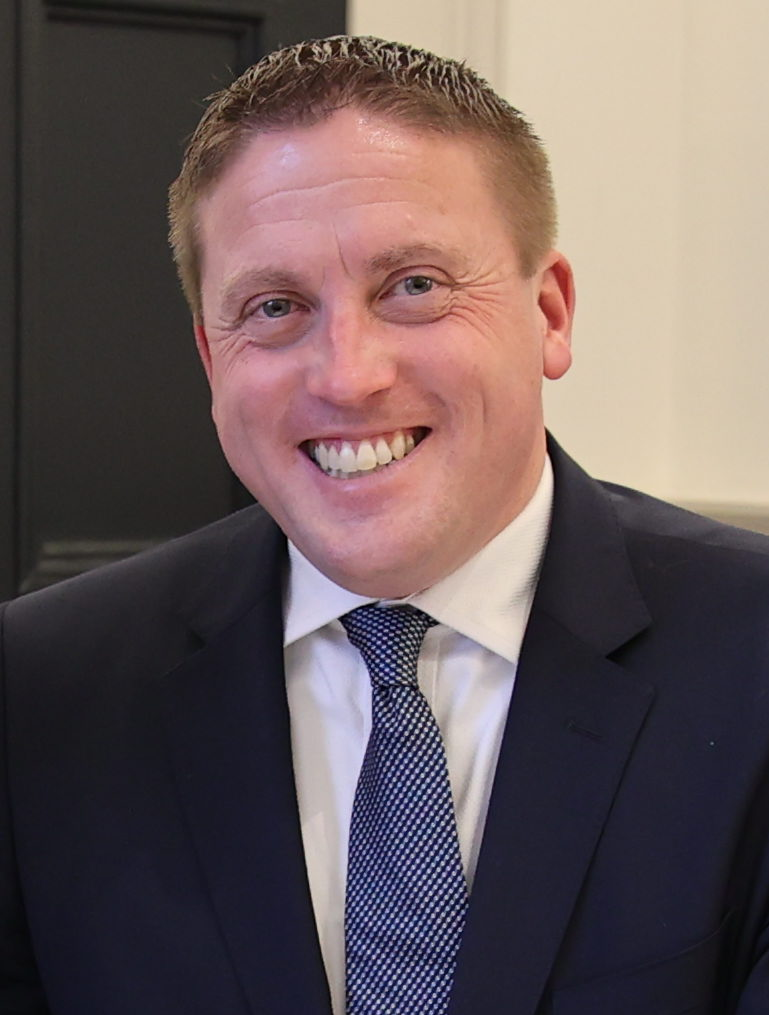
- Devlin in 2024

Teachta Dála
- Incumbent
- Assumed office February 2020
- Constituency: Dún Laoghaire

Personal details
- Born: 30 August 1980 (age 45) Dublin, Ireland
- Party: Fianna Fáil
- Spouse: Jennifer Devlin (m. 2014)
- Children: 3
- Education: Institute of Public Administration
- Website: cormacdevlin.ie

Cormac Devlin (born 30 August 1980) is an Irish Fianna Fáil politician who has been a Teachta Dála (TD) for the Dún Laoghaire constituency since the 2020 general election.

== Early and personal life ==
Devlin was educated at Harold Boys National School, Dalkey, Presentation Brothers College, Glasthule, and the Institute of Public Administration, Dublin. Devlin has been a full time public representative since the 2004 local elections, prior to that he was a manager with a local publishing company. Devlin became active in politics aged 16. He campaigned for Mary McAleese during her 1997 presidential campaign, before joining Ógra Fianna Fáil in 1998. In 1999, he was elected to the Board of Dún Laoghaire VEC, he remained a member of the board until 2014.

== Political career ==
=== Local politics ===
==== 2004 local elections ====
Devlin, aged 23, was elected to Dún Laoghaire–Rathdown County Council in 2004, taking the second seat in the Dún Laoghaire local electoral area with 1,776 first preference votes and becoming the youngest ever Councillor on the council

==== 2009 local elections ====
Devlin was re-elected to a second term on Dún Laoghaire–Rathdown County Council following the 2009 local elections, taking the fifth seat in the Dún Laoghaire local electoral area with 1,331 first preference votes. He was the only Fianna Fáil candidate to be elected in the Dún Laoghaire local electoral area. The election was marked by some controversy. Throughout the campaign it was reported that then Minister Mary Hanafin was attempting to "shaft" Devlin.

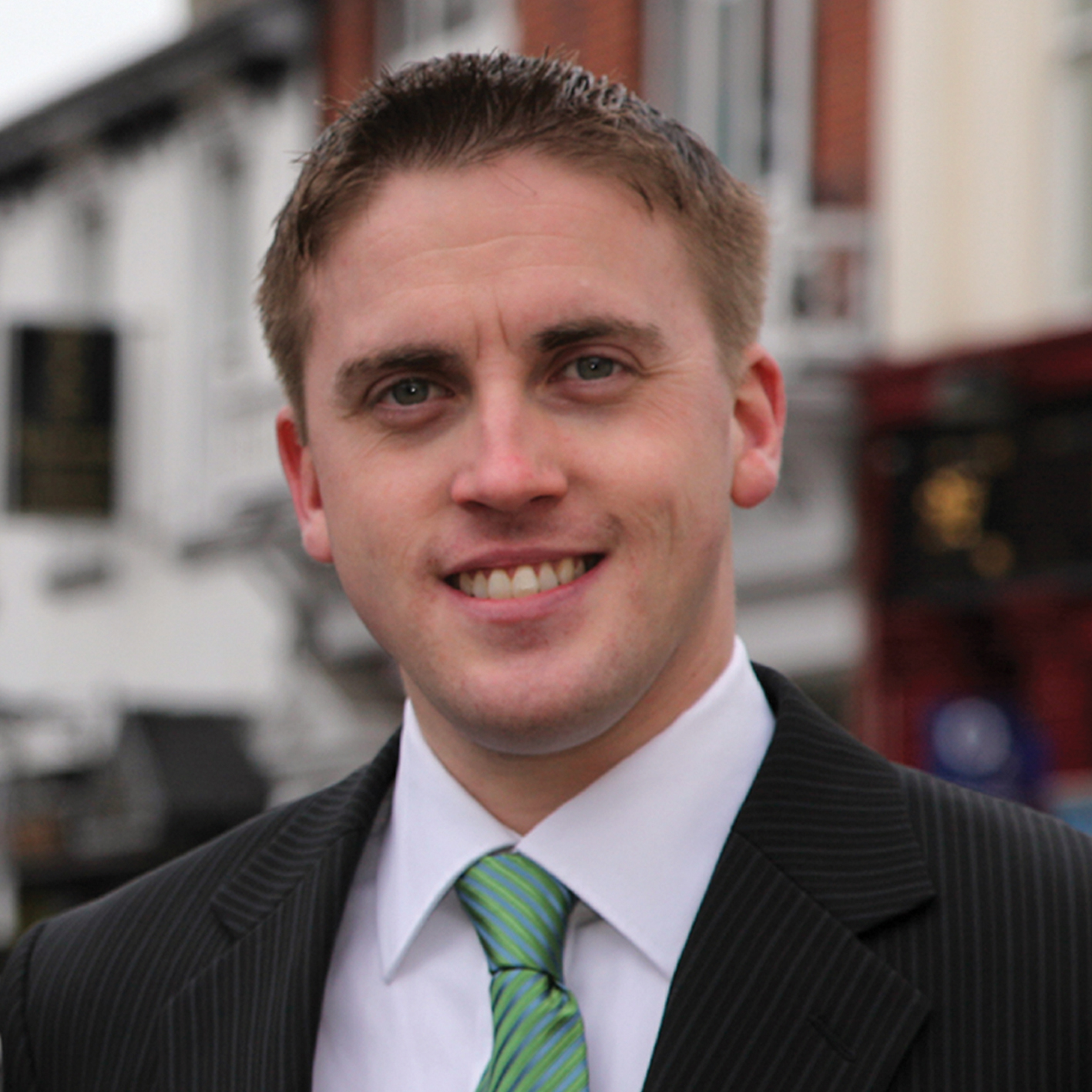
Devlin in 2013

In 2012, Councillors Cormac Devlin and Barry Ward's use of a Local Government Education and Training Fund was reviewed on foot of a complaint from Shane Hogan, a public servant and Labour Party member. Hogan claimed their use of the fund was a breach of Section 168 of the Local Government Act, 2001. The report found neither councillor had breached legislation, noting it was the responsibility of council administrators to ensure payments for training and education went through proper procedure. The report recommended Devlin repay €910 of the fees, which was since repaid. Mr. Hogan branded the report a "whitewash" and subsequently appealed the decision to SIPO. SIPO accepted the recommendations of the report.

==== 2014 local elections ====
Devlin was re-elected to a third term on Dún Laoghaire–Rathdown County Council following the 2014 local elections, coming second out of twenty one candidates.

==== 2016 general election campaign ====
In March 2015, at an event attended by over 100 supporters, Devlin announced that he would be seeing a Fianna Fáil nomination to contest the next general election in the Dún Laoghaire constituency. He was endorsed by former Minister Mary O'Rourke. Former Minister Mary Hanafin and Kate Feeney also indicated their intention to seek the nomination. The contest attracted widespread media attention being dubbed the "Battle of Blackrock II".

In early September 2015, there was intense speculation the Fianna Fáil National Constituencies Committee would attempt to exclude Devlin from the Dún Laoghaire candidate selection convention on the basis of his gender. Following the threat of legal action from Devlin, the committee backed down.

Devlin was selected as a general election candidate on 28 September 2015, beating Mary Hanafin and Kate Feeney. Prior to the election, Hanafin was added to the general election ticket. The two candidates split the Fianna Fáil vote and the party failed to win a seat in the election.

During the 2016 general election, Devlin told a Vincent Browne People's Debate that he held anti-abortion views. In that election, Devlin finished in sixth place with 4,665 first preference votes, behind Labour's Carrie Smyth and his party colleague Mary Hanafin.

==== Chairperson of Dún Laoghaire–Rathdown County Council ====
Devlin was elected as Cathaoirleach of Dún Laoghaire–Rathdown County Council on 13 June 2016, he listed housing, promoting civic engagement and supporting local enterprise as his key priorities during his term of office. In November 2016, Devlin took to a wheelchair for a day as part of a challenge to raise awareness of the issues facing people with a mobility impairment. He called on other public representatives to consider taking the challenge.

He was re-elected to the council at the 2019 election.

=== As a TD ===
At the 2020 general election, Devlin was elected as a Fianna Fáil TD for the Dún Laoghaire constituency.

At the 2024 general election, Devlin was re-elected to the Dáil. He was subsequently appointed Cathaoirleach of the Committee on the Implementation of the Good Friday Agreement.

Dáil	Election	Deputy (Party)	Deputy (Party)	Deputy (Party)	Deputy (Party)	Deputy (Party)
21st	1977	David Andrews (FF)	Liam Cosgrave (FG)	Barry Desmond (Lab)	Martin O'Donoghue (FF)	4 seats 1977–1981
22nd	1981	David Andrews (FF)	Liam T. Cosgrave (FG)	Barry Desmond (Lab)	Martin O'Donoghue (FF)	Seán Barrett (FG)
23rd	1982 (Feb)	David Andrews (FF)	Liam T. Cosgrave (FG)	Barry Desmond (Lab)	Martin O'Donoghue (FF)	Seán Barrett (FG)
24th	1982 (Nov)	David Andrews (FF)	Liam T. Cosgrave (FG)	Barry Desmond (Lab)	Monica Barnes (FG)	Seán Barrett (FG)
25th	1987	David Andrews (FF)	Geraldine Kennedy (PDs)	Barry Desmond (Lab)	Monica Barnes (FG)	Seán Barrett (FG)
26th	1989	David Andrews (FF)	Brian Hillery (FF)	Eamon Gilmore (WP)	Monica Barnes (FG)	Seán Barrett (FG)
27th	1992	David Andrews (FF)	Helen Keogh (PDs)	Eamon Gilmore (DL)	Niamh Bhreathnach (Lab)	Seán Barrett (FG)
28th	1997	David Andrews (FF)	Monica Barnes (FG)	Eamon Gilmore (Lab)	Mary Hanafin (FF)	Seán Barrett (FG)
29th	2002	Barry Andrews (FF)	Fiona O'Malley (PDs)	Eamon Gilmore (Lab)	Mary Hanafin (FF)	Ciarán Cuffe (GP)
30th	2007	Barry Andrews (FF)	Seán Barrett (Note: Served as Ceann Comhairle in the 31st Dáil from 2011 to 2016 and was returned automatically at the 2016 general election.) (FG)	Eamon Gilmore (Lab)	Mary Hanafin (FF)	Ciarán Cuffe (GP)
31st	2011	Mary Mitchell O'Connor (FG)	Seán Barrett (FG)	Eamon Gilmore (Lab)	Richard Boyd Barrett (PBP)	4 seats from 2011
32nd	2016	Mary Mitchell O'Connor (FG)	Seán Barrett (FG)	Maria Bailey (FG)	Richard Boyd Barrett (AAA–PBP)	4 seats from 2011
33rd	2020	Jennifer Carroll MacNeill (FG)	Ossian Smyth (GP)	Cormac Devlin (FF)	Richard Boyd Barrett (S–PBP)	4 seats from 2011
34th	2024	Jennifer Carroll MacNeill (FG)	Barry Ward (FG)	Cormac Devlin (FF)	Richard Boyd Barrett (PBP–S)	4 seats from 2011
