= Vincent MacDowell =

Northern Irish activist

Vincent MacDowell (1925–2003) was an Irish political activist. He was the vice chairman of Northern Ireland Civil Rights Association in the 1960s, and later a representative of the Green Party and the Irish Labour Party.

Born in Newry, County Down, MacDowell was interned for IRA membership in the 1940s. He was a member of the Socialist Republican Party in Belfast, where he edited the party's newspaper the Northern Star. MacDowell advocated the Irish Labour Party re-organising in Northern Ireland, and supported the party in elections in the late 1940s and early 1950s in Belfast.

He was elected as a Green Party councilor in Dún Laoghaire in 1999, after previously standing as an Independent and Labour party member.

His daughter is Nuala Ahern, a former Green Party MEP.
