= Barry Ward (politician) =

Irish politician

Barry Ward TD
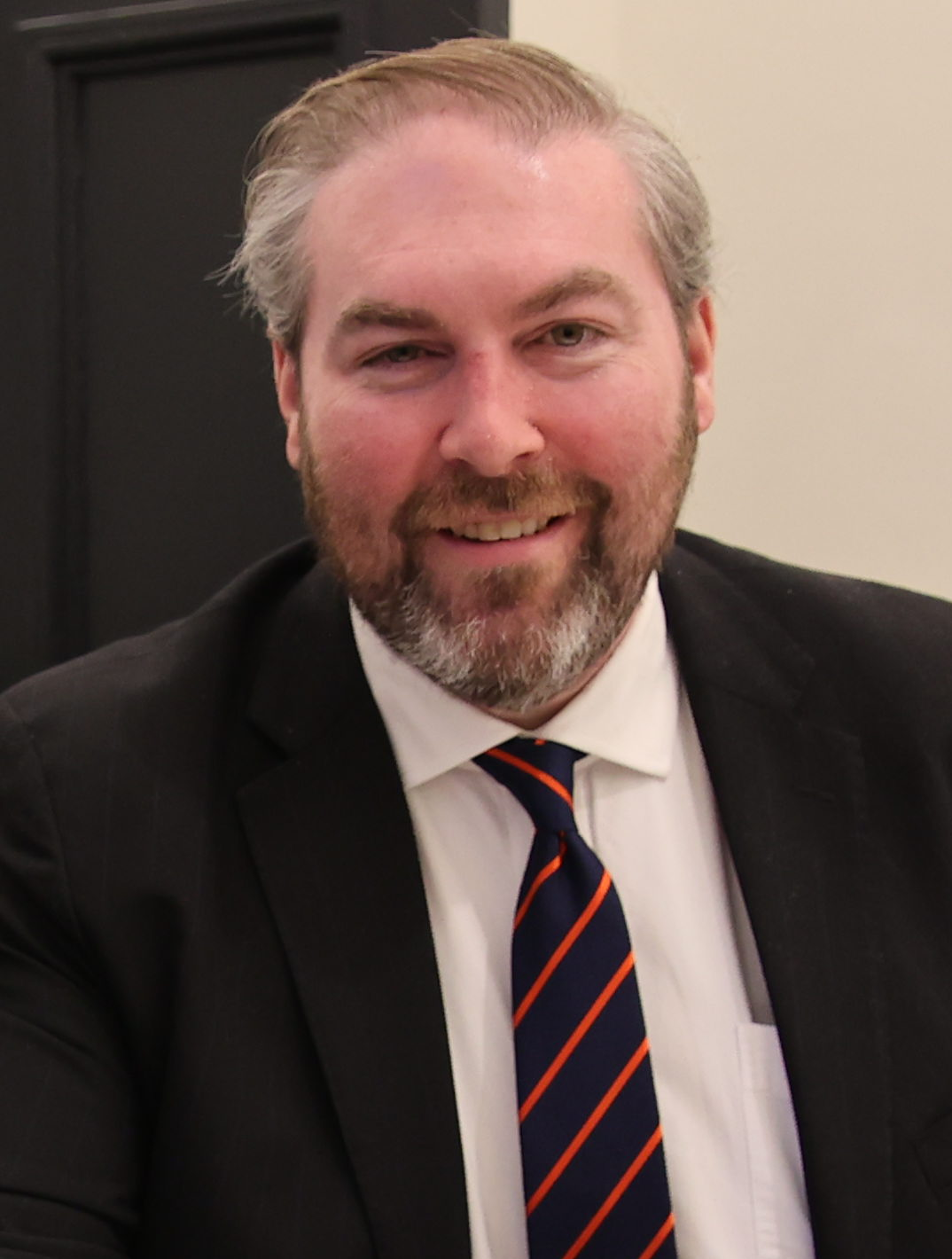
- Ward in 2024

Teachta Dála
- Incumbent
- Assumed office November 2024
- Constituency: Dún Laoghaire

Senator
- In office 29 June 2020 – 30 November 2024
- Constituency: Industrial and Commercial Panel

Personal details
- Born: 1976/1977 (age 48–49) Dublin, Ireland
- Party: Fine Gael
- Spouse: Aoife Ward
- Children: 1
- Education: University College Dublin; Trinity College Dublin; University of Paris; King's Inns
- Website: barryward.ie

Barry Ward (born 1976/1977) is an Irish Fine Gael politician who has served as a Teachta Dála (TD) for the Dún Laoghaire constituency since the 2024 general election. He previously served as a Senator on the Industrial and Commercial Panel from 2020 to 2024.

== Early life and education ==
Ward is originally from Deansgrange and is a senior counsel. He is a graduate of University College Dublin, serving as auditor of the Literary and Historical Society from 1998 to 1999 and the Young Progressive Democrats in the same academic year.

== Political career ==
Ward worked as a legal advisor to Enda Kenny, prior to seeking public office.

He was elected as a member of Dún Laoghaire–Rathdown County Council at the 2009 local elections. In 2011, he stood unsuccessfully at the Seanad election for the Administrative Panel. In 2012, he received over €10,000 from the council to finance an M.A. in economic policy from Trinity College Dublin. In 2016, Ward organised a John A. Costello commemoration in Deans Grange Cemetery. In 2020, he came to media attention when he proposed a ban on single-use plastics in takeaways in Dún Laoghaire–Rathdown. He also promoted the proposed Sutton-to-Sandycove greenway.

Ward stood unsuccessfully in Dún Laoghaire at the 2020 general election; he won 9.2% of first preference votes and finished seventh.

Ward was elected at the 2020 Seanad election as a senator for the Industrial and Commercial Panel.

At the 2024 general election, Ward was elected to the Dáil. He was subsequently appointed Cathaoirleach of the Committee on European Union Affairs.

== Personal life ==
Ward lives in Honeypark, Dun Laoghaire.

Dáil	Election	Deputy (Party)	Deputy (Party)	Deputy (Party)	Deputy (Party)	Deputy (Party)
21st	1977	David Andrews (FF)	Liam Cosgrave (FG)	Barry Desmond (Lab)	Martin O'Donoghue (FF)	4 seats 1977–1981
22nd	1981	David Andrews (FF)	Liam T. Cosgrave (FG)	Barry Desmond (Lab)	Martin O'Donoghue (FF)	Seán Barrett (FG)
23rd	1982 (Feb)	David Andrews (FF)	Liam T. Cosgrave (FG)	Barry Desmond (Lab)	Martin O'Donoghue (FF)	Seán Barrett (FG)
24th	1982 (Nov)	David Andrews (FF)	Liam T. Cosgrave (FG)	Barry Desmond (Lab)	Monica Barnes (FG)	Seán Barrett (FG)
25th	1987	David Andrews (FF)	Geraldine Kennedy (PDs)	Barry Desmond (Lab)	Monica Barnes (FG)	Seán Barrett (FG)
26th	1989	David Andrews (FF)	Brian Hillery (FF)	Eamon Gilmore (WP)	Monica Barnes (FG)	Seán Barrett (FG)
27th	1992	David Andrews (FF)	Helen Keogh (PDs)	Eamon Gilmore (DL)	Niamh Bhreathnach (Lab)	Seán Barrett (FG)
28th	1997	David Andrews (FF)	Monica Barnes (FG)	Eamon Gilmore (Lab)	Mary Hanafin (FF)	Seán Barrett (FG)
29th	2002	Barry Andrews (FF)	Fiona O'Malley (PDs)	Eamon Gilmore (Lab)	Mary Hanafin (FF)	Ciarán Cuffe (GP)
30th	2007	Barry Andrews (FF)	Seán Barrett (Note: Served as Ceann Comhairle in the 31st Dáil from 2011 to 2016 and was returned automatically at the 2016 general election.) (FG)	Eamon Gilmore (Lab)	Mary Hanafin (FF)	Ciarán Cuffe (GP)
31st	2011	Mary Mitchell O'Connor (FG)	Seán Barrett (FG)	Eamon Gilmore (Lab)	Richard Boyd Barrett (PBP)	4 seats from 2011
32nd	2016	Mary Mitchell O'Connor (FG)	Seán Barrett (FG)	Maria Bailey (FG)	Richard Boyd Barrett (AAA–PBP)	4 seats from 2011
33rd	2020	Jennifer Carroll MacNeill (FG)	Ossian Smyth (GP)	Cormac Devlin (FF)	Richard Boyd Barrett (S–PBP)	4 seats from 2011
34th	2024	Jennifer Carroll MacNeill (FG)	Barry Ward (FG)	Cormac Devlin (FF)	Richard Boyd Barrett (PBP–S)	4 seats from 2011
