= Monica Barnes =

Irish politician (1936–2018)

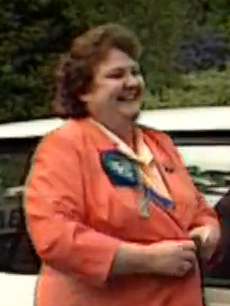
- Barnes in 1994

Teachta Dála
- In office June 1997 – May 2002
- In office November 1982 – November 1992
- Constituency: Dún Laoghaire

Member of the Council of State
- In office 20 February 1991 – 22 April 1995
- Appointed by: Mary Robinson

Senator
- In office 13 May 1982 – 24 November 1982
- Constituency: Labour Panel

Personal details
- Born: Monica MacDermott; 12 February 1936 Carrickmacross, County Monaghan, Ireland
- Died: 2 May 2018 (aged 82) Glenageary, Dublin, Ireland
- Party: Fine Gael
- Spouse: Bob Barnes (m. 1962)
- Children: 3

Monica Barnes (née MacDermott; 12 February 1936 – 2 May 2018) was an Irish Fine Gael politician who served as a Teachta Dála (TD) for the Dún Laoghaire constituency from 1982 to 1992 and 1997 to 2002. She was a Senator for the Labour Panel from February 1982 to November 1982 and a Member of the Council of State from 1991 to 1995. She was a feminist and women's right activist who co-founded the Council for the Status of Women (now the National Women's Council).

== Early life ==
Barnes was born Monica MacDermott on 12 February 1936 in Carrickmacross, County Monaghan. Her father was a trade unionist who worked at the Gypsum Industries Factory in Kingscourt, County Cavan. She was educated at the Louis Convent, Carrickmacross, County Monaghan, a boarding school to which she won a county council scholarship. She failed the Leaving Certificate Mathematics exam, which meant she could not progress to university. She worked in London as a clerk in the London Stock Exchange. After returning to Ireland, she met and married Bob Barnes and the couple moved to Rathmines, Dublin.

Barnes had two daughters and a son. After the birth of her first child, she later said she suffered from post-natal depression, a condition largely unrecognised in Ireland at the time. She was told by her doctor to "pull yourself together". Subsequently, she set up a support group for women with the condition and began to take an interest in equality and women's rights.

== Political activism ==
In 1973, the Report of the Commission on the Status of Women was published, identifying 49 discriminations to be removed and 19 suggestions as to how the status of women in Ireland could be improved. Also in 1973, the Irish government requested permission from the European Economic Community (EEC) to delay implementation of the Equal Pay directive when the country joined. In response, Barnes co-founded the Council for the Status of Women in 1973 (renamed the National Women's Council of Ireland in 1995), a move which prompted her to fully commit herself to politics. The Minister for Labour, Michael O'Leary, appointed Barnes to the Employment Equality Agency set up under the Employment Equality Act 1977.

In 1975, Barnes founded and was chairwoman of Woman Elect, an organisation to encourage and support women to stand for election.

== Electoral politics ==
Living in Glenageary in south Dublin, Barnes was active in the Dún Laoghaire Fine Gael constituency organisation dominated by the conservative Liam Cosgrave. Barnes was firmly in the FitzGerald wing of the party. She unsuccessfully contested the 1979 European Parliament election in the Leinster constituency (which did not include Dublin), which was not regarded seriously by mainstream politicians at the time.

Barnes unsuccessfully contested the 1981 general election in the Dún Laoghaire constituency, and after a further defeat at the February 1982 general election she was elected to the 16th Seanad as a Senator on the Labour Panel.

She was first elected to Dáil Éireann at the November 1982 general election, topping the poll for Fine Gael. In 1983, she opposed the wording of the Eighth Amendment to the Constitution, which gave equal right to life of the unborn and pregnant women. She was subjected to a hate campaign and received death threats during this time. "I had to stand up for women, and for the health and future of women".

Columnist Gene Kerrigan recalled that in 1984, when dozens of "peace" women were arrested during the visit of US President Ronald Reagan, Monica Barnes was the only politician to visit them in the cells of the Bridewell, where they were held until the president had departed.

She lost her seat in Dún Laoghaire at the 1992 general election but was elected in 1993 to the 20th Seanad. She unsuccessfully contested the 1994 European Parliament election. She was re-elected to the Dáil at the 1997 general election and retired from political life at the 2002 general election.

== Political views ==
Barnes was credited as a feminist and an advocate of women's rights. She was seen as having made a critical intervention that led to the passing of the Health (Family Planning) (Amendment) Bill 1985, which gave Irish adults the right to purchase non-medical contraceptives without having to get a doctor's prescription, which passed the Dáil by a margin of 82 to 79.

Barnes was also identified as being on the social liberal wing of Fine Gael in the 1980s, which was formed and led by Garret FitzGerald.

== Death ==
Barnes died on 2 May 2018 at her home in Glenageary, County Dublin, aged 82.

Dáil	Election	Deputy (Party)	Deputy (Party)	Deputy (Party)	Deputy (Party)	Deputy (Party)
21st	1977	David Andrews (FF)	Liam Cosgrave (FG)	Barry Desmond (Lab)	Martin O'Donoghue (FF)	4 seats 1977–1981
22nd	1981	David Andrews (FF)	Liam T. Cosgrave (FG)	Barry Desmond (Lab)	Martin O'Donoghue (FF)	Seán Barrett (FG)
23rd	1982 (Feb)	David Andrews (FF)	Liam T. Cosgrave (FG)	Barry Desmond (Lab)	Martin O'Donoghue (FF)	Seán Barrett (FG)
24th	1982 (Nov)	David Andrews (FF)	Liam T. Cosgrave (FG)	Barry Desmond (Lab)	Monica Barnes (FG)	Seán Barrett (FG)
25th	1987	David Andrews (FF)	Geraldine Kennedy (PDs)	Barry Desmond (Lab)	Monica Barnes (FG)	Seán Barrett (FG)
26th	1989	David Andrews (FF)	Brian Hillery (FF)	Eamon Gilmore (WP)	Monica Barnes (FG)	Seán Barrett (FG)
27th	1992	David Andrews (FF)	Helen Keogh (PDs)	Eamon Gilmore (DL)	Niamh Bhreathnach (Lab)	Seán Barrett (FG)
28th	1997	David Andrews (FF)	Monica Barnes (FG)	Eamon Gilmore (Lab)	Mary Hanafin (FF)	Seán Barrett (FG)
29th	2002	Barry Andrews (FF)	Fiona O'Malley (PDs)	Eamon Gilmore (Lab)	Mary Hanafin (FF)	Ciarán Cuffe (GP)
30th	2007	Barry Andrews (FF)	Seán Barrett (Note: Served as Ceann Comhairle in the 31st Dáil from 2011 to 2016 and was returned automatically at the 2016 general election.) (FG)	Eamon Gilmore (Lab)	Mary Hanafin (FF)	Ciarán Cuffe (GP)
31st	2011	Mary Mitchell O'Connor (FG)	Seán Barrett (FG)	Eamon Gilmore (Lab)	Richard Boyd Barrett (PBP)	4 seats from 2011
32nd	2016	Mary Mitchell O'Connor (FG)	Seán Barrett (FG)	Maria Bailey (FG)	Richard Boyd Barrett (AAA–PBP)	4 seats from 2011
33rd	2020	Jennifer Carroll MacNeill (FG)	Ossian Smyth (GP)	Cormac Devlin (FF)	Richard Boyd Barrett (S–PBP)	4 seats from 2011
34th	2024	Jennifer Carroll MacNeill (FG)	Barry Ward (FG)	Cormac Devlin (FF)	Richard Boyd Barrett (PBP–S)	4 seats from 2011
