= John Bailey (Irish politician) =

Irish Fine Gael politician (1945–2019)

Dún Laoghaire–Rathdown County Councillor
- In office 2004–2019
- Constituency: Dún Laoghaire

Personal details
- Born: 14 April 1945
- Died: 9 July 2019 (aged 74)
- Party: Fine Gael
- Children: 5, including Maria Bailey

John Bailey (14 April 1945 – 9 July 2019) was an Irish Fine Gael politician who was a member of Dún Laoghaire–Rathdown County Council. He spent 10 years as chairman of the Dublin County Board of the Gaelic Athletic Association.

== Political career ==
=== Fake endorsement letter incident ===
On 23 May 2007, the eve of the General Election in the Republic of Ireland, Bailey circulated a letter purporting to be an official missive from the Fine Gael party, advising party supporters to vote No 1 for Bailey for vote management reasons. The letter was headed with a photo of the party leader, Enda Kenny. This action was subsequently criticised by his running mate, Eugene Regan, who called the letter 'entirely dishonest'. Fine Gael's local director of elections, Paddy Hayes, described the letter as a 'serious breach of party discipline and unity'.

=== Missing Golf club planning objection ===
In 2009, Bailey wrote to constituents in the vicinity of Dún Laoghaire Golf Club to inform them that he had submitted an objection to An Bord Pleanála concerning building development proposed for the Golf club grounds. The appeals body denied receiving an objection from Bailey. Bailey stated it must have gone missing in the post and that his bank was trying to trace the cheque for his submission fee. The Sunday Business Post and The Sunday Tribune both reported that Bailey and his daughter had received financial donations towards their election campaigns from the builders and the estate agents of the Golf Club development. Bailey assured the public that the donations had no bearing on his failure to object to the development.

=== Legal action over candidate selection ===
Less than two years after the criticism by Eugene Regan of John Bailey, Regan's 25-year-old daughter, Naja, sought to be selected to run as a Fine Gael candidate in the 2009 local elections. The initial selection convention in November 2008 was cancelled at short notice following a letter written by the Fine Gael's three sitting councillors (including John Bailey) to the FG executive council declaring their "unanimous view" that they should be the only candidates selected to run in the ward.

The selection convention was held in February 2009. Naja Regan was prevented from contesting the selection process by order of the national executive council of Fine Gael. She responded by seeking a High Court injunction against Fine Gael for failing to follow its own procedures.

The case was settled out of court when Regan agreed not to contest the election but to be the first substitute candidate for he council in the event of a Fine Gael member ceasing to be a councillor during the term of the council.

=== Undeclared donations from developers ===
The Irish Times reported in August, 2010, that Bailey had received donations from a local developer, Devondale Holdings Ltd, that he failed to declare to the Standards in Public Office Commission. Bailey said he would return the donation straight away. “I’ve always declared everything and I’m not ashamed of anything I’ve done. Everything I do is straight on the table. I work 6½ days a week for Dún Laoghaire. Nobody has been stronger against developers,” he said. Subsequently, The Sunday Tribune reported that he had also received undeclared donations in breach of SIPO rules, from Cosgrave Developments Ltd, the developer of the Dun Laoghaire Golf Course scheme.

=== Fake newspaper endorsement ===
In 2013, Bailey issued a leaflet designed to look like a local newspaper, the Dun Laoghaire Gazette. The "newspaper" appeared to endorse Bailey, and painted him in a positive light. The Dublin Gazette group denied any involvement in the leaflet, and sought an apology from Bailey. He said that he had "no problem in apologising", but didn't "see what the big deal is". Fine Gael distanced themselves from the leaflet, saying that they would not "condone or support" such literature. This breach of copyright was facilitated by Niall Mescall, Managing Director of Reads Design & Print Sandyford & Dún Laoghaire. Mr Mescall instructed staff into editing an article about amgen and the National Rehabilitation Hospital indicating Gazette Group Newspapers had given permission for use in this way. It was reported that John Bailey had delivered approximately 300 of these leaflets to his constituents, however closer to 3000 were actually produced. For this Bailey paid Niall Mescall approximately €600.

=== Electoral history ===
He was elected to Dún Laoghaire–Rathdown County Council in 2004. On this occasion, his daughter, Maria Bailey, was also elected. They were re-elected in 2009. He was a candidate in the Irish general elections in 2002 and 2007 for the Dún Laoghaire constituency but failed to be elected to the Dáil. He failed to be elected to the Seanad in 2002 and 2007.

In April 2012, The Irish Times reported that he was the highest earning councillor on Dún Laoghaire-Rathdown council in 2011, earning more than €47,000.

== Sports administration career ==
=== Mickey Whelan and John O'Leary ===
In goalkeeper John O'Leary's autobiography Back to the Hill, he recounts that Bailey claimed to have O'Leary's support in order to persuade delegates to retain manager Mickey Whelan. However, O'Leary says he opposed Whelan and believes that the delegates were misled. 'Bailey presented them with a selective version of events', he wrote.

=== Sacking of Dublin manager Tommy Carr ===
Bailey tabled a motion of no confidence in Dublin manager Tommy Carr in February 2001. His motion failed, yet his public statements during the following months strongly supported Carr's position as manager - even to the point of denying that the no confidence motion had ever taken place. On 1 October 2001 Carr was removed as manager during a club meeting where the vote was tied and required Bailey's casting vote as chairman. Carr then confirmed that Bailey had been trying to remove him for the previous 8 months while publicly supporting him. The Dublin Senior Football Team stated they felt

"obliged to respond publicly in a bid to reverse the move, and highlight the lack of integrity involved in the due process...Honesty is demanded from anyone who wears the Dublin jersey. We expect it from our selectors and from our manager. Should we not, at least, expect honesty from our officials?"

=== Resignation of Niall Moyna ===
In 2002 Niall Moyna, head of Dublin City University's Sports Science and Health department, had been working for the Dublin County Board "to develop a best practice model for under-age football in Dublin which would eventually be used nationally". After a Dublin-Donegal match in August 2002, remarks made by Bailey were considered so offensive by Dr Moyna that he resigned his position. Bailey later said 'I was very animated at the time. I didn't set out to upset anybody, but I do fight the Dublin cause passionately.'

=== Dublin hurlers' revolt ===
In June 2005, Humphrey Kelleher was removed as manager of the Dublin hurling team, following their defeat by Laois. John Bailey was appointed interim manager. The players, however, refused to train under John Bailey and issued a joint public statement claiming that they felt intimidated after he had threatened them with being barred for life from playing for Dublin should they refuse to accept his management. Bailey had previously denied on radio that he had made this threat. Tommy Naughton was appointed shortly afterwards to be the new team manager, defusing the row.

== Personal life ==
Bailey was born in a house on Hyde Road in Dalkey. He ran a pub called The Arches in Dalkey which he sold in 1999. Subsequently he worked as a horse trainer. He was a Managing Director of Brendan Tours Ltd and a Managing Director of Budget Rent-A-Car. He had five daughters and lived in Killiney. He opposed marriage equality and also opposed abortion.

He died at his home in Killiney, County Dublin from motor neuron disease on 9 July 2019. On 14 October 2019, Mary Fayne was co-opted to his council seat.
