= 2024 Irish constitutional referendums =

Referendums on the family and care

Thirty-ninth Amendment of the Constitution of Ireland
- 8 March 2024
- (The Family) Bill 2023

Results
Choice	Votes	%
Yes	487,564	32.31%
No	1,021,546	67.69%
Valid votes	1,509,110	98.94%
Invalid or blank votes	16,105	1.06%
Total votes	1,525,215	100.00%
Registered voters/turnout	3,438,548	44.36%
- Results by Dáil constituency

Fortieth Amendment of the Constitution of Ireland
- 8 March 2024
- (Care) Bill 2023

Results
Choice	Votes	%
Yes	393,053	26.07%
No	1,114,620	73.93%
Valid votes	1,507,673	98.85%
Invalid or blank votes	17,548	1.15%
Total votes	1,525,221	100.00%
Registered voters/turnout	3,438,566	44.36%
- Results by Dáil constituency

The government of Ireland held two referendums on 8 March 2024 on proposed amendments to the Constitution of Ireland. The Thirty-ninth Amendment of the Constitution (The Family) Bill 2023 proposed to expand the constitutional definition of family to include durable relationships outside marriage. The Fortieth Amendment of the Constitution (Care) Bill 2023 proposed to replace a reference to women's "life within the home" and a constitutional obligation to "endeavour to ensure that mothers shall not be obliged by economic necessity to engage in labour to the neglect of their duties in the home" with a gender-neutral article on supporting care within the family.

Of the parties represented in the Dáil, the governing coalition partners Fianna Fáil, Fine Gael, and the Green Party called for Yes votes in both referendums, as did opposition parties Sinn Féin, the Labour Party, the Social Democrats, and People Before Profit–Solidarity. Opposition parties Aontú and Independent Ireland called for No votes in both. Civil society groups including the National Women's Council of Ireland, Treoir, Family Carers Ireland, One Family, and the Union of Students in Ireland advocated Yes votes in both referendums, as did Mary McAleese, a former president of Ireland. Groups including the Iona Institute, Family Solidarity, and Lawyers for No—an ad hoc group of barristers led by Senator Michael McDowell—campaigned for No votes in both. Opinion polls taken between early February and early March suggested a significant lead for the Yes campaign in both referendums.

Turnout nationwide was 44.36 percent of registered voters. Contradicting the opinion polls, voters comprehensively rejected both bills, with 67.69 percent voting No to the proposed Thirty-ninth Amendment on the Family and 73.93 percent voting No to the proposed Fortieth Amendment on Care. These were the highest and third-highest percentage votes for No in the history of Irish constitutional referendums. Of the 39 constituencies, only Dún Laoghaire supported the proposed Thirty-ninth Amendment, and none supported the proposed Fortieth. The Donegal constituency registered the highest percentage votes for No in both referendums, at 80.21 and 83.97 percent respectively.

== Background ==
The Constitution of Ireland came into force on 29 December 1937, following a statewide plebiscite held on 1 July 1937. An amendment to the Constitution of Ireland must be proposed as a bill initiated in Dáil Éireann and be passed, or deemed to have been passed, in both the Dáil and Seanad Éireann. The bill must then be submitted to a referendum in which all Irish citizens on the electoral register are eligible to vote.

In July 2018, Minister for Justice and Equality Charlie Flanagan announced the intention of the government to hold a referendum deleting Article 41.2 from the Constitution. This was to be held on the same day as the 2018 presidential election and a referendum to remove the offence of blasphemy. However, a decision of the Joint Oireachtas Committee on Justice and Equality to schedule pre-legislative hearings meant there was insufficient time to prepare a bill for the proposed October 2018 date.

In July 2019, the Oireachtas established a Citizens' Assembly on gender equality. It delivered a report in June 2021. An Oireachtas Committee on Gender Equality was established in December 2021 to consider the report of the assembly. It delivered a report in December 2022, in which it proposed changes to the constitution, including to Article 40.1 on equality and Article 41 on the Family.

On 8 March 2023, Taoiseach Leo Varadkar marked International Women's Day by announcing the government's intention to hold a referendum in November 2023 to enshrine gender equality in the Constitution by amending Articles 40 and 41.

Proposals for constitutional amendments were due to be published by the end of June with a referendum to follow in November. In August 2023, official and political sources told The Irish Times that the referendum was unlikely to take place in November, as planned. Scrutiny of the term "family" by senior officials drafting the text of the amendment had raised thorny questions about its definition and about related gender issues, provoking official caution likely to create delay. The following week, in September, Taoiseach Varadkar announced that the government had decided to hold two referendums on the issue, in the "lifetime of the Government". He said the wordings of the amendments had not yet been finalised.

On 5 December 2023, Varadkar and the Tánaiste, Micheál Martin, confirmed the topics of the two referendums proposed to be held on 8 March 2024. Gender equality was not included in the proposals, to avoid the placing of gender discrimination above other types of discrimination.

== Wording ==
The bills were presented to the Dáil by Roderic O'Gorman, the Minister for Children, Equality, Disability, Integration and Youth, on 8 December 2023. Both bills were passed by the Dáil on 17 January 2024. They were passed by the Seanad on 23 January.

=== The Family ===
The Thirty-Ninth Amendment of the Constitution (The Family) Bill 2023 (bill no. 91 of 2023) proposed to amend Article 41.1.1° to insert the words "whether founded on marriage or on other durable relationships". It also proposed the deletion of the words "on which the Family is founded" from Article 41.3.1°.

Subsection	Current text	Proposed text
41.1.1°	The State recognises the Family as the natural primary and fundamental unit group of Society, and as a moral institution possessing inalienable and imprescriptible rights, antecedent and superior to all positive law.	The State recognises the Family, whether founded on marriage or on other durable relationships, as the natural primary and fundamental unit group of Society, and as a moral institution possessing inalienable and imprescriptible rights, antecedent and superior to all positive law.
41.3.1°	The State pledges itself to guard with special care the institution of Marriage, on which the Family is founded, and to protect it against attack.	The State pledges itself to guard with special care the institution of Marriage and to protect it against attack.

=== Care ===
The Fortieth Amendment of the Constitution (Care) Bill 2023 (bill no. 92 of 2023) proposed to delete Article 41.2 from the Constitution and to insert a new Article 42B. It would also renumber Articles 41.3 and 41.4 as 41.2 and 41.3 respectively.

Article 41.2 proposed to be deleted	Article 42B proposed to be inserted
1° In particular, the State recognises that by her life within the home, woman gives to the State a support without which the common good cannot be achieved. 2° The State shall, therefore, endeavour to ensure that mothers shall not be obliged by economic necessity to engage in labour to the neglect of their duties in the home.	The State recognises that the provision of care, by members of a family to one another by reason of the bonds that exist among them, gives to Society a support without which the common good cannot be achieved, and shall strive to support such provision.

== Campaign ==
On 24 January, the Minister for Housing, Local Government and Heritage Darragh O'Brien signed an order setting the polling day for both referendums as 8 March, to take place between the hours of 7 a.m. and 10 p.m.

On 25 January, the Electoral Commission launched an information campaign to explain the proposed amendments and promote participation. This was the first time it performed the function, which was previously the responsibility of a Referendum Commission established for each referendum.

The Department of Housing, Local Government and Heritage estimated the cost of the campaign as between €16 million to €17 million.

=== Political parties ===
Both amendments were supported by the government parties of Fianna Fáil (with Thomas Byrne as director of elections), Fine Gael (with Heather Humphreys as director of elections), and the Green Party (with Pauline O'Reilly as director of elections). Among the opposition parties, they were supported by the Labour Party, the Social Democrats and People Before Profit. Sinn Féin was due to decide on the issue at a meeting of their Ard Comhairle on 3 February 2024 and eventually decided on 12 February to support both referendums "despite considerable disappointment with how the government has handled the upcoming proposals for constitutional change". On 20 February 2024 Mary Lou McDonald said that Sinn Féin would re-run the Care referendum, with a revised wording, if it is rejected and if Sinn Féin were in government.

Two parties represented in the Dáil, Aontú and Independent Ireland, opposed both amendments. Senator Sharon Keogan erected posters advocating a No vote in both referendums, using money raised from a GoFundMe page. One of the posters which read "Don't force mothers out to work...Vote No." was described by the Electoral Commission as "an incorrect representation" of the question people are being asked to vote on. Senator Rónán Mullen and party leader of the Human Dignity Alliance also called for No vote on both amendments.

On 4 March 2024, An Rabharta Glas supported a Yes vote for the Family amendment and a No vote for the Care amendment, describing the latter as a "cynical window-dressing exercise which actually abdicates state responsibility for care and erodes the status of people with disabilities and carers". The Communist Party of Ireland also supported a Yes vote for the Family amendment and a No vote for the Care amendment. The Irish Freedom Party, the National Party, Ireland First, the Centre Party of Ireland, the Farmers' Alliance, The Irish People and Liberty Republic opposed both amendments. It was reported that the Christian Solidarity Party also opposed both; however this party is not on the Register of Political Parties anymore.

The Electoral Commission granted Fine Gael, Fianna Fáil, Sinn Féin, the Green Party and Ireland First status as approved bodies for the referendum campaign.

=== Civil society groups ===
The amendments were supported by civil society groups including the National Women's Council of Ireland, Treoir, Family Carers Ireland, One Family, Union of Students in Ireland, and Spark. Mary McAleese, a former president of Ireland, and Sinéad Gibney, who had resigned the previous day as the chief commissioner of the Irish Human Rights and Equality Commission, addressed an event hosted by Treoir and One Family to call for Yes votes in both referendums. The Law Society of Ireland supported a Yes vote in both referendums. This caused disagreement among some solicitors.

Both amendments were opposed by the Iona Institute, Family Solidarity, and the Irish Women's Lobby. Lawyers for No, an ad hoc group including Michael McDowell, Michael McNamara, Brenda Power and Maria Steen, stated their opposition on 29 February. McDowell argued that a person could seek to resist deportation on the grounds of a durable relationship if the Family amendment was approved. The Lawyers for No group also claimed that extending the constitutional definition of family to include durable relationships would have "long-term consequences for family law, family property rights, succession law, pension law, tax law, welfare law, and migration and residence law." A march held in Dublin on 3 February 2024 calling for a No vote in both referendums was attended by around 100 people including Senator Sharon Keogan.

The Free Legal Advice Centres (FLAC) supported the Family amendment but did not support the Care amendment, which they described as "implicitly sexist" and "ineffective". Both Independent Living Movement Ireland and the Irish Council for Civil Liberties criticised the wording of the Care amendment but neither organisation campaigned against it. A group of disability campaigners, Equality Not Care, called for a No vote on the care referendum. Trinity College Dublin Students' Union endorsed a Yes vote in the Family referendum and a No vote in the Care referendum.

=== Religious groups ===
The Catholic Bishops' Conference said it would not be issuing any public comment until their Spring General Meeting which takes place in the days running up to the vote, however a statement was read out at mass on 25 February 2024 calling for a No vote in both referendums, arguing that Yes votes would weaken the incentive to marry and remove motherhood from the Constitution. Denis Nulty, Bishop of Kildare and Leighlin had expressed concerns about the changes. The Catholic Archbishop of Dublin, Dermot Farrell said that "there will continue to be a moral obligation on governments and public policy to protect the institution of marriage and support vulnerable people and their families regardless of the outcome" and urged people to take part in the democratic process.

The Presbyterian Church in Ireland released a statement that said "The ambiguity and lack of clarity contained within some of the amendments will mean that it is unlikely to introduce meaningful change, which could have been of benefit to society as a whole. The proposed amendment, which seeks to remove the link between marriage and family, is also disappointing, but is an indication of Ireland’s changing culture."

Imam Hussein Halawa of the Islamic Cultural Centre of Ireland stated he did not believe there is a need to amend the Constitution but stopped short of calling for a vote either way. Rabbi Yoni Wieder of the Dublin Hebrew Congregation stated that they would not be taking any stance on the referendum. Michael Jackson, Archbishop of Dublin in the Church of Ireland, declined to make a statement citing the level of debate around the term "durable".

=== Attorney General advice leak ===
The day before the referendum, The Ditch, an online news site, published an article containing leaked advice from Attorney General Rossa Fanning to Roderic O'Gorman on the proposed Care amendment. The advice stated that there was a "lack of guidance from the courts" on how the word "strive" would be interpreted. Both No campaigners and Yes campaigners argued that the advice supported their position.

== Opinion polling ==
=== The Family ===
Dates conducted	Polling firm / Commissioner	Sample size	Yes	No	Undecided	Would not vote	Lead	Sources
1–2 March 2024	Ireland Thinks/Sunday Independent	1,083	42%	23%	35%		19%	
16–21 February 2024	Red-C/The Business Post	1,009	52%	22%	20%	5%	30%	
2–6 February 2024	Ipsos B&A/The Irish Times	1,200	53%	15%	27%	5%	38%	
1–2 February 2024	Ireland Thinks/Sunday Independent	1,394	47%	29%	24%		18%	

=== Care ===
Dates conducted	Polling firm / Commissioner	Sample size	Yes	No	Undecided	Would not vote	Lead	Sources
1–2 March 2024	Ireland Thinks/Sunday Independent	1,083	39%	24%	36%		15%	
16–21 February 2024	Red-C/The Business Post	1,009	56%	20%	19%	5%	36%	
2–6 February 2024	Ipsos B&A/The Irish Times	1,200	60%	12%	23%	5%	48%	
1–2 February 2024	Ireland Thinks/Sunday Independent	1,394	49%	27%	24%		22%	

== Voting and counting ==
Voting took place from 7:00 a.m. to 10:00 p.m. on 8 March. Counting began at 9:00 a.m. on 9 March. The official results were announced separately at Dublin Castle on the evening of 9 March. The result of the Thirty-ninth Amendment referendum on Family was announced shortly before 7:00 p.m. and that of the Fortieth Amendment referendum on Care was announced shortly after 9:00 p.m.

== Results ==
=== Thirty-ninth Amendment ===
Thirty-ninth Amendment of the Constitution (The Family) Bill 2023
Choice	Votes	%
For	487,564	32.31
Against	1,021,546	67.69
Total	1,509,110	100.00
Valid votes	1,509,110	98.94
Invalid/blank votes	16,105	1.06
Total votes	1,525,215	100.00
Registered voters/turnout	3,438,566	44.36

Thirty-ninth Amendment referendum result (excluding invalid votes)
No: 1,021,546 (67.69%)	Yes: 487,564 (32.31%)
▲

Thirty-ninth Amendment (The Family) – Results by constituency
Constituency	Electorate	Turnout (%)	Votes		Proportion of votes	
Constituency	Electorate	Turnout (%)	Yes	No	Yes	No
Carlow–Kilkenny	117,528	42.7%	14,518	35,028	29.3%	70.7%
Cavan–Monaghan	108,812	44.8%	10,569	37,649	21.9%	78.1%
Clare	90,101	44.0%	12,573	26,574	32.1%	67.9%
Cork East	90,343	42.5%	12,048	25,925	31.7%	68.3%
Cork North-Central	86,075	42.6%	11,254	24,933	31.1%	68.9%
Cork North-West	71,326	44.7%	10,447	21,133	33.1%	66.9%
Cork South-Central	89,739	45.1%	15,504	24,628	38.6%	61.4%
Cork South-West	67,187	42.8%	10,886	17,555	38.3%	61.7%
Donegal	123,452	40.0%	9,669	39,181	19.8%	80.2%
Dublin Bay North	105,369	50.7%	20,401	32,582	38.5%	61.5%
Dublin Bay South	71,395	39.1%	13,749	13,942	49.7%	50.3%
Dublin Central	54,330	43.0%	9,689	13,387	42.0%	58.0%
Dublin Fingal	101,393	46.9%	18,846	28,296	40.0%	60.0%
Dublin Mid-West	73,673	47.6%	10,031	24,727	28.9%	71.1%
Dublin North-West	50,999	47.6%	6,901	17,039	28.8%	71.2%
Dublin Rathdown	65,457	47.4%	15,195	15,566	49.4%	50.6%
Dublin South-Central	71,834	45.6%	11,103	21,209	34.4%	65.6%
Dublin South-West	106,405	47.6%	17,223	32,926	34.3%	65.7%
Dublin West	70,483	46.2%	11,930	20,327	37.0%	63.0%
Dún Laoghaire	97,315	45.5%	22,073	21,818	50.3%	49.7%
Galway East	70,758	40.8%	7,988	20,557	28.0%	72.0%
Galway West	99,994	41.7%	13,909	27,298	33.8%	66.2%
Kerry	112,263	42.6%	13,580	33,741	28.7%	71.3%
Kildare North	83,219	48.2%	15,972	23,763	40.2%	59.8%
Kildare South	78,345	45.7%	10,771	24,666	30.4%	69.6%
Laois-Offaly	112,150	43.7%	11,776	36,703	24.3%	75.7%
Limerick City	75,651	43.4%	10,291	22,195	31.7%	68.3%
Limerick County	70,551	42.6%	8,145	21,602	27.4%	72.6%
Longford–Westmeath	92,626	40.9%	9,497	27,940	25.4%	74.6%
Louth	106,842	47.6%	14,496	35,783	28.8%	71.2%
Mayo	97,519	43.4%	10,217	31,565	24.5%	75.5%
Meath East	67,867	45.9%	10,035	20,931	32.4%	67.6%
Meath West	74,871	39.7%	8,263	21,157	28.1%	71.9%
Roscommon–Galway	66,184	43.7%	7,441	21,173	26.0%	74.0%
Sligo–Leitrim	93,065	42.7%	11,030	28,206	28.1%	71.9%
Tipperary	122,159	44.4%	14,328	39,338	26.7%	73.3%
Waterford	85,910	42.9%	11,986	24,404	32.9%	67.1%
Wexford	114,653	42.5%	13,348	34,791	27.7%	72.3%
Wicklow	100,723	51.4%	19,882	31,308	38.8%	61.2%
Total	3,438,566	44.4%	487,564	1,021,546	32.3%	67.7%

=== Fortieth Amendment ===
Fortieth Amendment of the Constitution (Care) Bill 2023
Choice	Votes	%
For	393,053	26.07
Against	1,114,620	73.93
Total	1,507,673	100.00
Valid votes	1,507,673	98.85
Invalid/blank votes	17,548	1.15
Total votes	1,525,221	100.00
Registered voters/turnout	3,438,566	44.36

Fortieth Amendment referendum result (excluding invalid votes)
No: 1,114,620 (73.93%)	Yes: 393,053 (26.07%)
▲

Fortieth Amendment (Care) – Results by constituency
Constituency	Electorate	Turnout (%)	Votes		Proportion of votes	
Constituency	Electorate	Turnout (%)	Yes	No	Yes	No
Carlow–Kilkenny	117,528	42.7%	13,768	35,735	27.8%	72.2%
Cavan–Monaghan	108,812	44.8%	9,038	39,166	18.7%	81.3%
Clare	90,101	44.0%	10,131	28,979	25.9%	74.1%
Cork East	90,343	42.5%	9,619	28,320	25.3%	74.7%
Cork North-Central	86,075	42.6%	8,687	27,440	24.0%	76.0%
Cork North-West	71,326	44.6%	8,335	23,217	26.4%	73.6%
Cork South-Central	89,739	45.1%	11,838	28,235	29.5%	70.5%
Cork South-West	67,187	42.8%	8,943	19,486	31.5%	68.5%
Donegal	123,452	40.0%	7,834	41,030	16.0%	84.0%
Dublin Bay North	105,369	50.7%	15,559	37,109	29.5%	70.5%
Dublin Bay South	71,395	39.2%	11,454	16,217	41.4%	58.6%
Dublin Central	54,330	43.0%	7,013	15,984	30.5%	69.5%
Dublin Fingal	101,393	46.9%	14,695	32,391	31.2%	68.8%
Dublin Mid-West	73,673	47.6%	7,525	27,201	21.7%	78.3%
Dublin North-West	50,999	47.6%	4,902	18,992	20.5%	79.5%
Dublin Rathdown	65,457	47.4%	12,619	18,080	41.1%	58.9%
Dublin South-Central	71,834	45.6%	7,904	24,379	24.5%	75.5%
Dublin South-West	106,405	47.6%	13,225	36,881	26.4%	73.6%
Dublin West	70,483	46.2%	9,357	22,893	29.0%	71.0%
Dún Laoghaire	97,315	45.5%	18,527	25,370	42.2%	57.8%
Galway East	70,758	40.8%	6,289	22,222	22.1%	77.9%
Galway West	99,994	41.7%	10,660	30,567	25.9%	74.1%
Kerry	112,263	42.6%	11,458	35,809	24.2%	75.8%
Kildare North	83,219	48.2%	12,628	27,054	31.8%	68.2%
Kildare South	78,345	45.7%	8,380	27,051	23.7%	76.3%
Laois-Offaly	112,150	43.7%	9,674	38,779	20.0%	80.0%
Limerick City	75,651	43.4%	8,096	24,322	25.0%	75.0%
Limerick County	70,551	42.6%	6,750	22,981	22.7%	77.3%
Longford–Westmeath	92,626	40.9%	8,023	29,412	21.4%	78.6%
Louth	106,842	47.6%	11,506	38,775	22.9%	77.1%
Mayo	97,519	43.3%	9,009	32,807	21.5%	78.5%
Meath East	67,867	45.9%	7,993	22,942	25.8%	74.2%
Meath West	74,871	39.7%	6,542	22,840	22.3%	77.7%
Roscommon–Galway	66,184	43.7%	6,295	22,293	22.0%	78.0%
Sligo–Leitrim	93,065	42.7%	9,210	30,011	23.5%	76.5%
Tipperary	122,159	44.4%	12,083	41,500	22.6%	77.4%
Waterford	85,910	42.9%	9,675	26,753	26.6%	73.4%
Wexford	114,653	42.5%	12,477	35,619	25.9%	74.1%
Wicklow	100,723	51.4%	15,332	35,778	30.0%	70.0%
Total	3,438,566	44.4%	393,053	1,114,620	26.1%	73.9%

== Reactions ==
Following the release of final results, Varadkar acknowledged that the electorate had delivered "two wallops" to the government and said that it would respect the result. The Leader of the Opposition Mary Lou McDonald said that the government had "come up short in terms of the caring wording" and that there had been a "lack of clarity", but insisted that her party was still "very much" in touch with the public. Aontú supporters gathered to celebrate the referendum result at the courtyard of Dublin Castle.

An exit poll carried out by Ireland Thinks for the Sunday Independent gave a breakdown of voting patterns based on party support and identified some of the reasons for the No vote in each referendum. It found that only Fine Gael and Green Party supporters had a majority voting Yes in the Care Referendum, with Labour Party supporters evenly split. All other party supporters voted against the Care amendment by a margin of greater than 70 per cent. In the Family Referendum, supporters of Fianna Fáil, Sinn Féin and Independents overwhelmingly voted No, while supporters of Fine Gael, the Green Party, Social Democrats and People Before Profit voted Yes. Reasons for voting No in the Family referendum included lack of clarity in the wording, opposition to, or distrust of the government, and contentment with current laws or beliefs in marriage. Reasons for voting No in the Care referendum included vague or poor wording, concerns about government responsibility and support for carers, and potential undermining of the recognition and protection of women's roles.

Fianna Fáil politicians Lisa Chambers, Niamh Smyth, Willie O'Dea, John McGuinness and Éamon Ó Cuív caused controversy when they admitted to having voted No on one or both referendums, despite the party's position being a Yes vote on both referendums.

Less than two weeks after the result of the referendums was announced, Varadkar announced his decision to step down as Taoiseach. Some media outlets linked this decision to the failure of both referendums; however, Green Party leader, Eamon Ryan said he did not believe it was the "defining reason" for the resignation.
