= Séamus Brennan =

Irish politician (1948–2008)

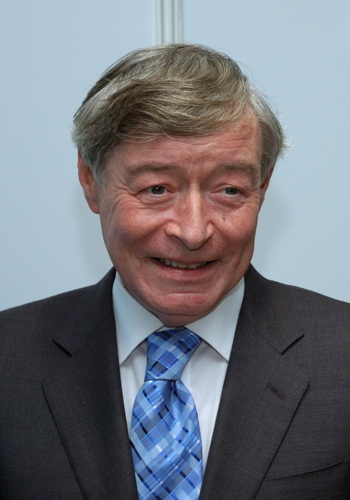
- Brennan in 2008

Minister for Arts, Sport and Tourism
- In office 14 June 2007 – 6 May 2008
- Taoiseach: Bertie Ahern
- Preceded by: John O'Donoghue
- Succeeded by: Martin Cullen

Minister for Social and Family Affairs
- In office 29 September 2004 – 14 June 2007
- Taoiseach: Bertie Ahern
- Preceded by: Mary Coughlan
- Succeeded by: Martin Cullen

Minister for Transport
- In office 6 June 2002 – 29 September 2004
- Taoiseach: Bertie Ahern
- Preceded by: Mary O'Rourke
- Succeeded by: Martin Cullen
- In office 12 July 1989 – 11 February 1992
- Taoiseach: Charles Haughey
- Preceded by: John Wilson
- Succeeded by: Máire Geoghegan-Quinn

Minister of State
- 1997–2002: Government Chief Whip
- 1997–2002: Defence
- 1993–1994: Enterprise and Employment

Minister for Education
- In office 11 February 1992 – 12 January 1993
- Taoiseach: Albert Reynolds
- Preceded by: Noel Davern
- Succeeded by: Niamh Bhreathnach

Minister of State
- 1987–1989: Industry and Commerce

Teachta Dála
- In office June 1981 – 9 July 2008
- Constituency: Dublin South

Senator
- In office 27 October 1977 – 11 June 1981
- Constituency: Nominated by the Taoiseach

Personal details
- Born: 16 February 1948 Salthill, Galway, Ireland
- Died: 9 July 2008 (aged 60) Churchtown, Dublin, Ireland
- Party: Fianna Fáil
- Spouse: Ann Brennan (m. 1978)
- Children: 6, including Shay
- Education: University College Galway; University College Dublin

Séamus Brennan (/ˈʃeɪməs/ SHAY-məs; 16 February 1948 – 9 July 2008) was an Irish Fianna Fáil politician who served as Minister for Arts, Sport and Tourism from 2007 to 2008, Minister for Social and Family Affairs from 2004 to 2007, Minister for Transport from 1989 to 1992 and 2002 to 2004, Government Chief Whip from 1997 to 2002, Minister of State at the Department of Enterprise and Employment from 1993 to 1994, Minister for Education from 1992 to 1993 and Minister of State at the Department of Industry and Commerce from 1987 to 1989. He served as a Teachta Dála (TD) for the Dublin South constituency from 1981 to 2008. He also served as a Senator from 1977 to 1981, after being nominated by the Taoiseach.

== Early life ==
Brennan was born in Galway in 1948. He was educated at St. Joseph's Patrician College in Galway. He attended University College Galway, graduating with a Bachelor of Commerce in 1968 and a Bachelor of Arts (Economics) the following year. He attended University College Dublin too. He qualified as an accountant. Brennan found an interest in politics during his teens when he canvassed for Fianna Fáil during elections.

In 1973, he succeeded Tommy Mullins as General Secretary of Fianna Fáil. He began to revamp the party structure; this included setting up a youth section and a national executive. He studied and was impressed by the 1976 United States presidential election. He applied new techniques such as marketing strategies and opinion polls to the 1977 general election. This resulted in the biggest-ever parliamentary majority for any party; Fianna Fáil and Jack Lynch were back in power with a 20-seat majority. Brennan was appointed to Seanad Éireann as a Senator.

== Political career ==
In 1979, Brennan supported George Colley in the Fianna Fáil leadership election caused by the retirement of Jack Lynch. However, Charles Haughey was narrowly elected as leader and a new Secretary General of the party was appointed. At the 1981 general election, Brennan was elected to Dáil Éireann for Dublin South and was returned at every subsequent election until his death in 2008. In the early 1980s, he was a prominent member of the Gang of 22 who tried unsuccessfully to wrest control of the Fianna Fáil party from Haughey. He supported Colley and later Desmond O'Malley in various leadership heaves during those years. It was widely expected that Brennan would join the Progressive Democrats when they were founded by O'Malley in 1985, but he remained within Fianna Fáil.

In 1987, Fianna Fáil returned to office and Brennan was appointed Minister of State at the Department of Industry and Commerce with responsibility for trade and marketing. In 1989, he was appointed to cabinet minister as Minister for Tourism and Transport. In 1991, his portfolio was widened to Minister for Tourism, Transport and Communications. In February 1992, Albert Reynolds succeeded Haughey as Taoiseach, with Brennan being one of the few ministers in Haughey's cabinet who Reynolds retained in cabinet. He was appointed Minister for Education. In January 1993, a Fianna Fáil–Labour Party coalition came to office and Brennan was demoted to Minister of State at the Department of Enterprise and Employment with responsibility for commerce and technology. He remained in this position until 1994.

From November 1994, Fianna Fáil were again in opposition, and the new party leader Bertie Ahern designated Brennan as Opposition Spokesperson for Transport, Energy and Communications. In 1997, Fianna Fáil returned to power and Brennan was appointed as Minister of State at the Department of the Taoiseach. He was appointed as Minister for Transport in 2002.

In the cabinet reshuffle of September 2004, Brennan was moved to the post of Minister for Social and Family Affairs. He was bitterly disappointed but he refused to describe it as a demotion. After the 2007 general election, he played a key role in the negotiations to form a government with the Green Party, whom he addressed with the since oft-quoted phrase "Ye are playing senior hurling now". He did not seek ministerial office in Brian Cowen's cabinet and tendered his resignation on 6 May 2008, for medical reasons.

== Political views ==
Brennan's political views were shaped by a combination of social liberalism and free-market economics. He supported legal reforms such as the legalisation of divorce and the unrestricted availability of contraception, advocating for greater social freedoms. On economic matters, Brennan championed market-driven policies aimed at encouraging enterprise and reducing state intervention in the economy. His focus was on promoting exports, updating company laws, and facilitating the growth of small businesses. Brennan also sought to modernise Ireland's infrastructure, playing a key role in transport projects and pushing for reforms in the education and welfare systems. While supportive of the social partnership model, he was also critical of certain aspects, such as the tax policies of previous governments.

== Death ==
Brennan died in the early hours of 9 July 2008 at his home in Churchtown in Dublin. He had been suffering from cancer. He is survived by his wife Ann, their two sons and four daughters. Taoiseach Brian Cowen said Brennan would be remembered as "a brilliant political strategist, a dedicated constituency TD, a reforming minister and a very popular colleague".

== By-election ==
His death brought about a by-election at which his son Shay Brennan was the unsuccessful Fianna Fáil candidate. It was won by George Lee of Fine Gael.

His son Shay Brennan was elected to the Dáil for the Dublin Rathdown constituency at the 2024 general election.

Political offices
New office	Minister of State at the Department of Industry and Commerce; 1987–1989	Succeeded by Terry Leyden
Preceded by John Wilson	Minister for Tourism and Transport; 1989–1991	Succeeded by Himself as Minister for Tourism, Transport and Communications
Preceded by Himself as Minister for Tourism and Transport	Minister for Tourism, Transport and Communications; 1991–1992	Succeeded by Máire Geoghegan-Quinn
Preceded by Noel Davern	Minister for Education; 1992–1993	Succeeded by Niamh Bhreathnach
Preceded by Michael Ahern	Minister of State at the Department of Enterprise and Employment; 1993–1994	Succeeded by Pat Rabbitte
Preceded by Jim Higgins	Government Chief Whip; 1997–2002	Succeeded by Mary Hanafin
Preceded by Mary O'Rourke as Minister for Public Enterprise	Minister for Transport; 2002–2004	Succeeded by Martin Cullen
Preceded by Mary Coughlan	Minister for Social and Family Affairs; 2004–2007	Succeeded by Martin Cullen
Preceded by John O'Donoghue	Minister for Arts, Sport and Tourism; 2007–2008	Succeeded by Martin Cullen

Dáil	Election	Deputy (Party)	Deputy (Party)	Deputy (Party)	Deputy (Party)	Deputy (Party)	Deputy (Party)	Deputy (Party)
2nd	1921	Thomas Kelly (SF)	Daniel McCarthy (SF)	Constance Markievicz (SF)	Cathal Ó Murchadha (SF)	4 seats 1921–1923		
3rd	1922	Thomas Kelly (PT-SF)	Daniel McCarthy (PT-SF)	William O'Brien (Lab)	Myles Keogh (Ind.)	4 seats 1921–1923		
4th	1923	Philip Cosgrave (CnaG)	Daniel McCarthy (CnaG)	Constance Markievicz (Rep)	Myles Keogh (Ind.)	Cathal Ó Murchadha (Rep)	Michael Hayes (CnaG)	Peadar Doyle (CnaG)
4th	1923 by-election	Philip Cosgrave (CnaG)	Daniel McCarthy (CnaG)	Constance Markievicz (Rep)	Myles Keogh (Ind.)	Cathal Ó Murchadha (Rep)	Hugh Kennedy (CnaG)	Peadar Doyle (CnaG)
4th	March 1924 by-election	James O'Mara (CnaG)	Daniel McCarthy (CnaG)	Constance Markievicz (Rep)	Myles Keogh (Ind.)	Cathal Ó Murchadha (Rep)	Hugh Kennedy (CnaG)	Peadar Doyle (CnaG)
4th	November 1924 by-election	James O'Mara (CnaG)	Daniel McCarthy (CnaG)	Constance Markievicz (Rep)	Myles Keogh (Ind.)	Cathal Ó Murchadha (Rep)	Seán Lemass (SF)	Peadar Doyle (CnaG)
4th	1925 by-election	James O'Mara (CnaG)	Thomas Hennessy (CnaG)	Constance Markievicz (Rep)	Myles Keogh (Ind.)	Cathal Ó Murchadha (Rep)	Seán Lemass (SF)	Peadar Doyle (CnaG)
5th	1927 (Jun)	James Beckett (CnaG)	Vincent Rice (NL)	Constance Markievicz (FF)	Myles Keogh (Ind.)	Thomas Lawlor (Lab)	Seán Lemass (FF)	Peadar Doyle (CnaG)
5th	1927 by-election	James Beckett (CnaG)	Vincent Rice (NL)	Thomas Hennessy (CnaG)	Myles Keogh (Ind.)	Thomas Lawlor (Lab)	Seán Lemass (FF)	Peadar Doyle (CnaG)
6th	1927 (Sep)	James Beckett (CnaG)	Robert Briscoe (FF)	Thomas Hennessy (CnaG)	Myles Keogh (CnaG)	Frank Kerlin (FF)	Seán Lemass (FF)	Peadar Doyle (CnaG)
7th	1932	James Beckett (CnaG)	Robert Briscoe (FF)	Thomas Hennessy (CnaG)	Myles Keogh (CnaG)	James Lynch (FF)	Seán Lemass (FF)	Peadar Doyle (CnaG)
8th	1933	James Beckett (CnaG)	Robert Briscoe (FF)	James McGuire (CnaG)	Thomas Kelly (FF)	James Lynch (FF)	Seán Lemass (FF)	Peadar Doyle (CnaG)
9th	1937	Myles Keogh (FG)	Robert Briscoe (FF)	Thomas Lawlor (Lab)	Thomas Kelly (FF)	Joseph Hannigan (Ind.)	Seán Lemass (FF)	Peadar Doyle (FG)
10th	1938	James Beckett (FG)	Robert Briscoe (FF)	James Lynch (FF)	Thomas Kelly (FF)	Joseph Hannigan (Ind.)	Seán Lemass (FF)	Peadar Doyle (FG)
10th	1939 by-election	John McCann (FF)	Robert Briscoe (FF)	James Lynch (FF)	Thomas Kelly (FF)	Joseph Hannigan (Ind.)	Seán Lemass (FF)	Peadar Doyle (FG)
11th	1943	Maurice Dockrell (FG)	Robert Briscoe (FF)	James Lynch (FF)	James Larkin Jnr (Lab)	John McCann (FF)	Seán Lemass (FF)	Peadar Doyle (FG)
12th	1944	Maurice Dockrell (FG)	Robert Briscoe (FF)	James Lynch (FF)	James Larkin Jnr (Lab)	John McCann (FF)	Seán Lemass (FF)	Peadar Doyle (FG)
13th	1948	Constituency abolished. See Dublin South-Central, Dublin South-East and Dublin South-West.						

Dáil	Election	Deputy (Party)	Deputy (Party)	Deputy (Party)	Deputy (Party)	Deputy (Party)
22nd	1981	Niall Andrews (FF)	Séamus Brennan (FF)	Nuala Fennell (FG)	John Kelly (FG)	Alan Shatter (FG)
23rd	1982 (Feb)	Niall Andrews (FF)	Séamus Brennan (FF)	Nuala Fennell (FG)	John Kelly (FG)	Alan Shatter (FG)
24th	1982 (Nov)	Niall Andrews (FF)	Séamus Brennan (FF)	Nuala Fennell (FG)	John Kelly (FG)	Alan Shatter (FG)
25th	1987	Tom Kitt (FF)	Séamus Brennan (FF)	Anne Colley (PDs)	John Kelly (FG)	Alan Shatter (FG)
26th	1989	Tom Kitt (FF)	Séamus Brennan (FF)	Nuala Fennell (FG)	Roger Garland (GP)	Alan Shatter (FG)
27th	1992	Tom Kitt (FF)	Séamus Brennan (FF)	Liz O'Donnell (PDs)	Eithne FitzGerald (Lab)	Alan Shatter (FG)
28th	1997	Tom Kitt (FF)	Séamus Brennan (FF)	Liz O'Donnell (PDs)	Olivia Mitchell (FG)	Alan Shatter (FG)
29th	2002	Tom Kitt (FF)	Séamus Brennan (FF)	Liz O'Donnell (PDs)	Olivia Mitchell (FG)	Eamon Ryan (GP)
30th	2007	Tom Kitt (FF)	Séamus Brennan (FF)	Alan Shatter (FG)	Olivia Mitchell (FG)	Eamon Ryan (GP)
30th	2009 by-election	Tom Kitt (FF)	George Lee (FG)	Alan Shatter (FG)	Olivia Mitchell (FG)	Eamon Ryan (GP)
31st	2011	Shane Ross (Ind.)	Peter Mathews (FG)	Alan Shatter (FG)	Olivia Mitchell (FG)	Alex White (Lab)
32nd	2016	Constituency abolished. See Dublin Rathdown, Dublin South-West and Dún Laoghaire.				
