= Colm Brophy =

Irish politician (born 1966)

Colm Brophy TD
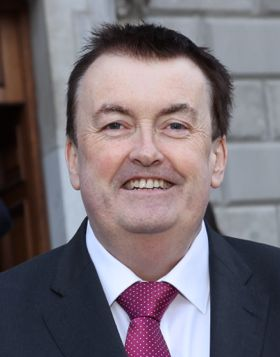
- Brophy in 2024

Minister of State
- 2025–: Justice, Home Affairs and Migration
- 2020–2022: Foreign Affairs

Chair of the Committee on Budgetary Oversight
- In office 13 December 2017 – 1 July 2020
- Preceded by: Josepha Madigan
- Succeeded by: Neasa Hourigan

Teachta Dála
- Incumbent
- Assumed office February 2016
- Constituency: Dublin South-West

Personal details
- Born: 22 June 1966 (age 60) Dublin, Ireland
- Party: Fine Gael
- Spouse: Maeve O'Connell (m. 1998)
- Education: Dublin Institute of Technology

Colm Brophy (born 22 June 1966) is an Irish Fine Gael politician who has been a Teachta Dála (TD) for the Dublin South-West constituency since the 2016 general election. He served as a Minister of State from July 2020 to December 2022 and again since February 2025.

== Early life ==
Originally from Cabinteely, Brophy studied business at Rathmines College of Commerce. Before becoming a councillor, he was the Director of Elections for the European Parliament campaigns for Fine Gael candidates Mary Banotti and Gay Mitchell.

== Political career ==
Brophy was co-opted to South Dublin County Council in 2008, and served as a councillor until 2016. During 2015 until his election to the Dáil, Brophy served as President of the Association of Irish Local Government (AILG).

At the 2016 general election, Brophy stood as one of three Fine Gael candidates in the Dublin South-West constituency. He won with 10.7% of the first preference votes, and was elected on the sixteenth count. Brian Lawlor was co-opted to fill Brophy's seat on South Dublin County Council.

He was appointed Chair of the Dáil Committee on Budgetary Oversight in December 2017.

At the 2020 general election, he won 12.2% of the first-preference votes, and was re-elected on the tenth count. Following the formation of the 32nd government of Ireland, Brophy was appointed on 1 July 2020 as Minister of State at the Department of Foreign Affairs with responsibility for overseas development aid and diaspora. He said that his "focus in the coming months and years will be to listen to, and to support, our Diaspora communities, particularly its most vulnerable members". He was not re-appointed as a junior minister as part of the 33rd government of Ireland in December 2022.

At the 2024 general election, Brophy was re-elected to the Dáil. In February 2025, he was appointed as Minister of State at the Department of Justice, Home Affairs and Migration with responsibility for migration.

== Personal life ==
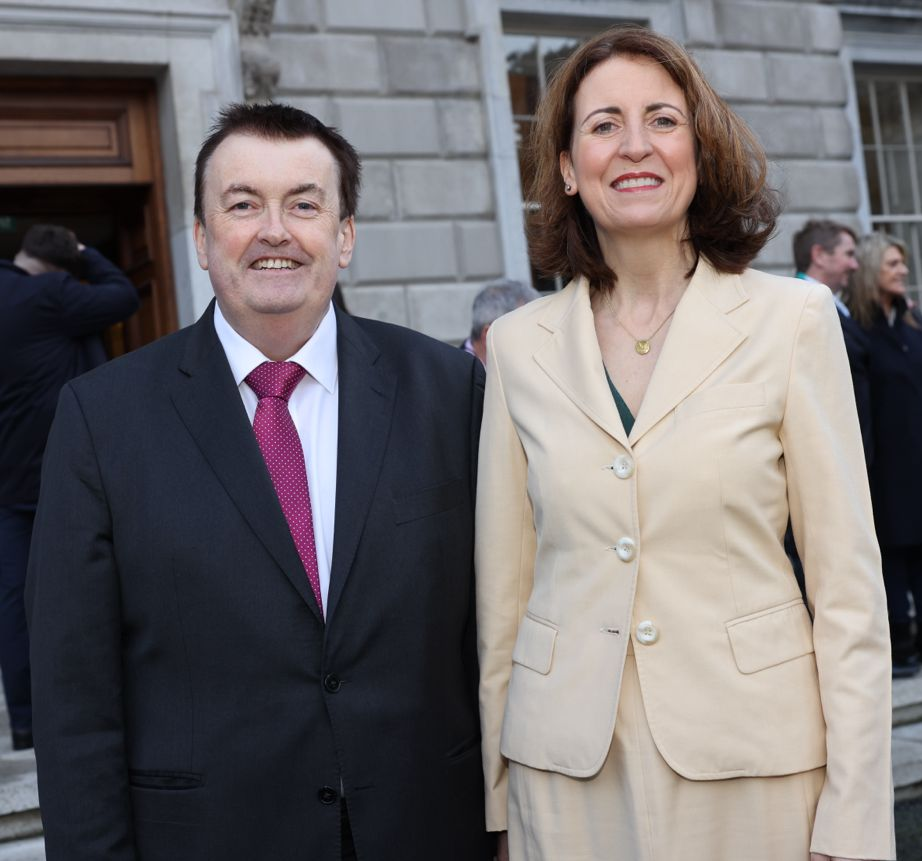
Brophy and his wife Maeve O'Connell in 2024

Brophy is married to Maeve O'Connell, who was elected as a Fine Gael TD for Dublin Rathdown at the 2024 general election.

Political offices
Preceded by Ciarán Cannon	Minister of State at the Department of Foreign Affairs; 2020–2022	Succeeded by Seán Fleming
Preceded by James Browne (Justice); Joe O'Brien (Children, Equality, Disability, Integration and Youth)	Minister of State at the Department of Justice, Home Affairs and Migration; 2025–present	Incumbent

Dáil	Election	Deputy (Party)	Deputy (Party)	Deputy (Party)	Deputy (Party)	Deputy (Party)
13th	1948	Seán MacBride (CnaP)	Peadar Doyle (FG)	Bernard Butler (FF)	Michael O'Higgins (FG)	Robert Briscoe (FF)
14th	1951	Seán MacBride (CnaP)	Peadar Doyle (FG)	Bernard Butler (FF)	Michael ffrench-O'Carroll (Ind.)	Robert Briscoe (FF)
15th	1954	Seán MacBride (CnaP)	Peadar Doyle (FG)	Bernard Butler (FF)	Michael O'Higgins (FG)	Robert Briscoe (FF)
15th	1956 by-election	Seán MacBride (CnaP)	Noel Lemass (FF)	Bernard Butler (FF)	Michael O'Higgins (FG)	Robert Briscoe (FF)
16th	1957	James Carroll (Ind.)	Noel Lemass (FF)	Bernard Butler (FF)	Michael O'Higgins (FG)	Robert Briscoe (FF)
16th	1959 by-election	James Carroll (Ind.)	Noel Lemass (FF)	Richie Ryan (FG)	Michael O'Higgins (FG)	Robert Briscoe (FF)
17th	1961	James Carroll (Ind.)	Noel Lemass (FF)	Richie Ryan (FG)	James O'Keeffe (FG)	Robert Briscoe (FF)
18th	1965	John O'Connell (Lab)	Noel Lemass (FF)	Richie Ryan (FG)	Joseph Dowling (FF)	Ben Briscoe (FF)
19th	1969	John O'Connell (Lab)	Noel Lemass (FF)	Seán Dunne (Lab)	Joseph Dowling (FF)	4 seats 1969–1977
19th	1970 by-election	John O'Connell (Lab)	Noel Lemass (FF)	Seán Sherwin (FF)	Joseph Dowling (FF)	4 seats 1969–1977
20th	1973	John O'Connell (Lab)	Noel Lemass (FF)	Declan Costello (FG)	Joseph Dowling (FF)	4 seats 1969–1977
20th	1976 by-election	John O'Connell (Lab)	Brendan Halligan (Lab)	Declan Costello (FG)	Joseph Dowling (FF)	4 seats 1969–1977
21st	1977	Constituency abolished. See Dublin Ballyfermot				

Dáil	Election	Deputy (Party)	Deputy (Party)	Deputy (Party)	Deputy (Party)	Deputy (Party)
22nd	1981	Seán Walsh (FF)	Larry McMahon (FG)	Mary Harney (FF)	Mervyn Taylor (Lab)	4 seats 1981–1992
23rd	1982 (Feb)	Seán Walsh (FF)	Larry McMahon (FG)	Mary Harney (FF)	Mervyn Taylor (Lab)	4 seats 1981–1992
24th	1982 (Nov)	Seán Walsh (FF)	Michael O'Leary (FG)	Mary Harney (FF)	Mervyn Taylor (Lab)	4 seats 1981–1992
25th	1987	Seán Walsh (FF)	Chris Flood (FF)	Mary Harney (PDs)	Mervyn Taylor (Lab)	4 seats 1981–1992
26th	1989	Pat Rabbitte (WP)	Chris Flood (FF)	Mary Harney (PDs)	Mervyn Taylor (Lab)	4 seats 1981–1992
27th	1992	Pat Rabbitte (DL)	Chris Flood (FF)	Mary Harney (PDs)	Mervyn Taylor (Lab)	Éamonn Walsh (Lab)
28th	1997	Pat Rabbitte (DL)	Chris Flood (FF)	Mary Harney (PDs)	Conor Lenihan (FF)	Brian Hayes (FG)
29th	2002	Pat Rabbitte (Lab)	Charlie O'Connor (FF)	Seán Crowe (SF)	Conor Lenihan (FF)	4 seats 2002–2016
30th	2007	Pat Rabbitte (Lab)	Charlie O'Connor (FF)	Brian Hayes (FG)	Conor Lenihan (FF)	4 seats 2002–2016
31st	2011	Pat Rabbitte (Lab)	Eamonn Maloney (Lab)	Brian Hayes (FG)	Seán Crowe (SF)	4 seats 2002–2016
31st	2014 by-election	Pat Rabbitte (Lab)	Eamonn Maloney (Lab)	Paul Murphy (AAA)	Seán Crowe (SF)	4 seats 2002–2016
32nd	2016	Colm Brophy (FG)	John Lahart (FF)	Paul Murphy (AAA–PBP)	Seán Crowe (SF)	Katherine Zappone (Ind.)
33rd	2020	Colm Brophy (FG)	John Lahart (FF)	Paul Murphy (S–PBP)	Seán Crowe (SF)	Francis Noel Duffy (GP)
34th	2024	Colm Brophy (FG)	John Lahart (FF)	Paul Murphy (PBP–S)	Seán Crowe (SF)	Ciarán Ahern (Lab)
