= National Advocacy Service (Ireland) =

Statutory body in Ireland

- Abbreviation: NAS
- Formation: 2011
- Type: Statutory body
- Headquarters: Dublin, Ireland
- Region served: Ireland
- Services: Patient Advocacy Service; National Advocacy Service for People with Disabilities

The National Advocacy Service for People with Disabilities, also known as the National Advocacy Service (NAS), is a statutory body in Ireland. It was established in January 2011, fulfilling the legislative obligations as established in the Comhairle Act 2000 and the Citizens Information Act 2007. The NAS is primarily funded by the Citizens Information Board. The Irish Human Rights and Equality Commission website describes the National Advocacy Service as providing "an independent, confidential and free, representative advocacy service" with a "particular remit for people with disabilities".

== History ==
The establishment of the NAS was announced by Minister for Social Protection, Éamon Ó Cuív, in 2010. It was formally launched by the then Minister for Social Protection, Joan Burton, in March 2011.

The organisation acts as a representative for individuals who are either patients, or have disabilities. Writing on its remit, RTÉ News stated that "the publicly-funded National Advocacy Service (NAS) has been providing free, independent and confidential representative advocacy to people with disabilities across the republic". The disability service operates by assigning individuals certified independent representatives who can provide them with advice or support regarding the process of claiming for assistance, i.e., housing or welfare, as well as deal on their behalf regarding matters that impact them.

The Patient Advocacy Service, introduced in November 2019 by then Minister for Health, Simon Harris, was designed to provide assistance to patients who choose to file a grievance regarding the care they have received in a public hospital. It was funded by the Department of Health, and was independent of the HSE. The service is intended to provide confidential and free patient advocacy supports that are "hosted by NAS and funded by the Department of Health". It responds to inquiries from residents of hospitals, public nursing homes, and private nursing homes.

The NAS published two reports in 2021, following the COVID-19 pandemic in Ireland, covering the pandemic's impact on individuals with disabilities, including social isolation, anxiety and depression.

In January 2024, the NAS's board chairperson, Rosemary Smyth, stated that several individuals with disabilities were either not permitted to handle their own funds in any way or were only receiving a stipend, which restricted their autonomy and options. According to the 2023 Annual Report by the National Advocacy Service, published in early 2024, "people can face challenges with banking and digital exclusion, may experience control of their finances by others and even financial abuse". According to the report, as of 2023, there were 250 individuals on the advocacy waiting list for assistance with housing, healthcare and other concerns – a 55% increase on the previous year.

The National Advocacy Service suggested in May 2024 that the decision to declare over 200 individuals as wards of court, in early 2023, may have been motivated by apprehension regarding the implementation of assisted decision-making legislation. The Assisted Decision-Making (Capacity) Act 2015, which commenced in 2023, replaced the Lunacy Act 1871, and removed the ward of court system.

In June 2024, SIPTU members employed by the National Advocacy Service declared that they would initiate industrial action in relation to a dispute on compensation and working conditions. The organisation, which indicated that the strike action would likely result in service disruptions, stated that the Citizens Information Board, the source of funding for the NAS, was responsible for setting the organisation's wages. Management were accused by the union of overlooking a Labour Court proposal regarding staff compensation. Following a two-week strike, SIPTU balloted its members on proposals to resolve the dispute.
