= Human rights in Ireland =

Human rights in Ireland are protected under the Irish Constitution and European provisions. Since 2014 the Irish Human Rights and Equality Commission has overseen human rights in the republic. Human rights issues in the country that have raised concern include abortion rights, child abuse, and human trafficking.

In Northern Ireland, the Good Friday Agreement (1998) contains guarantees of human rights underwritten by both the British and Irish governments.

== Statutory protection ==
According to the Irish Human Rights and Equality Commission, human rights in Ireland are contained under and protected by, "the Irish Constitution, the European Convention of Human Rights Act 2004-2014 and where EU law is applicable, the EU Charter of Fundamental Rights". The commission also states that although Irish law is bound to international law in its ratification of human rights, "it only gives effect to the provisions of that treaty in domestic law through Acts of the Oireachtas, or where a treaty right is already provided for under the Irish Constitution." The commission also outlines that the responsibility for determining human rights violations lies with Ireland's national courts.

=== The Irish Human Rights and Equality Commission ===
The Irish Human Rights and Equality Commission is an independent public body, "established under the Irish Human Rights and Equality Commission Act 2014," to, "protect and promote human rights and equality in Ireland and build a culture of respect for human rights, equality and intercultural understanding in the State." The findings of the commission were presented, in the form of a 68-page report, to the UN Human Rights Committee, in Geneva, in July 2017, by chief commissioner Emily Logan. According to Logan, the commission found that, "significant gaps in human rights protection remain," including; human trafficking, abortion legislation, disability and discrimination, the protection and reunification of refugee families, and the conditions of detention.

The commission stands as a government body that ensures that all public bodies in Ireland respect and protect the human rights of Irish citizens. This responsibility is outlined in section 42 of the Irish Human Rights Act, which states that it was, "established a positive duty on public sector bodies to: eliminate discrimination, promote equality of opportunity and treatment, protect human rights."

== Rights in Ireland: 1972 to 1998 ==
=== The Troubles ===
The Troubles, a guerilla conflict in Northern Ireland fought predominantly between the sectarian groups, the nationalist Irish Republican Army (IRA), and the loyalist Ulster Volunteer Force (UVF). The IRA fought against the discrimination of Northern Ireland's Catholic Minority by Protestants, and for Irish nationalism separate from the United Kingdom.

==== Bloody Sunday: 30 January 1972 ====
On 30 January 1972, in the Northern Irish city of Derry, 30 000 people gathered to march in a peaceful protest against the policy internment of IRA volunteers. The march turned violent, with British Soldiers and other local security forces opened fire on the crowd, killing 13 civilians. According to Attorney Lynn Wartchow, Northern Irish and British security forces were often preemptively violent in response to Catholic demonstrations, "the State did not trust that such opposition could be peaceful given that it came from the same community that bred the increasingly violent IRA."

The event became known in Irish history as, "Bloody Sunday," and Wartchow points out that although the massacre violated the right to life under Irish law, British troops were cleared of wrongdoing. Bloody Sunday saw the escalation of the sectarian violence within the troubles, and was seen as indicative of the Northern Irish and British governments oppression and suppression of the civil rights of the Catholic minority. According to Wartchow "after Bloody Sunday, the Catholic population felt cornered into accepting an oppressive and discriminatory ruling government with little, if any, legitimate recourse before the law."

The troubles primarily brought to attention the division that existed between Protestants and Catholics regarding their human rights; namely the right to be outspoken and protest about the plight of Northern Irish Catholics without the threat of violent suppression.

==== The Good Friday Agreement ====
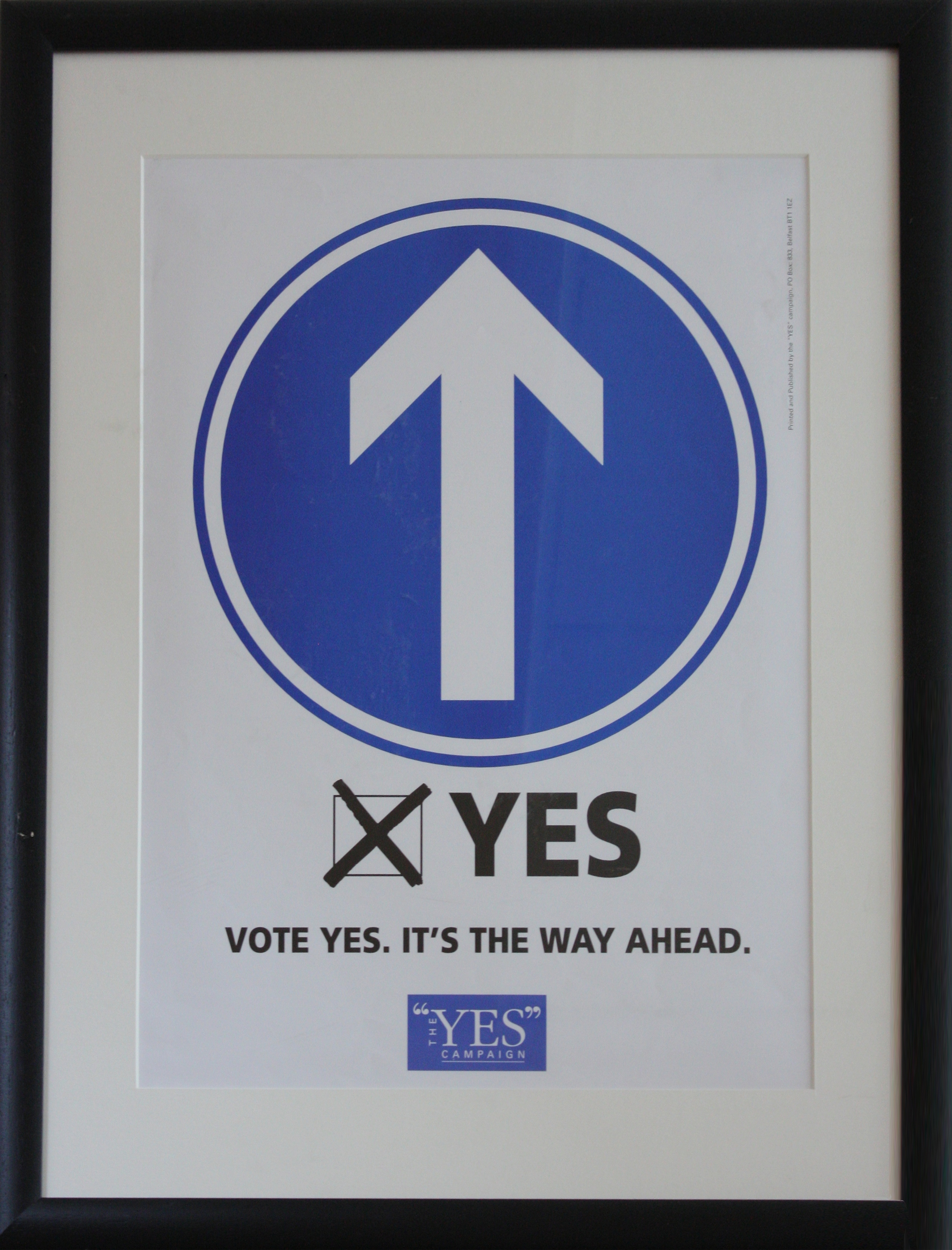
"Vote Yes, It's the way Ahead" A sign for the, "Yes", campaign in the ratification of the Belfast Agreement Referendum

The Good Friday Agreement, or the Belfast Agreement, was an accord that brought an end to the 30-year sectarian conflict. The agreement was signed on 10 April 1998, by the British Government, the Irish Government, and the political parties of Northern Ireland, and was ratified after a referendum in May 1998. The Agreement established a commitment from all signatories to equality and the protection of the human rights of all Northern Irish citizens.

== Child abuse in Ireland ==
=== Sexual abuse within the Catholic Church ===
Since the late 1980s, allegations of sexual abuse against children within the Catholic Church in Ireland have been consistently emerging. In 2011, the allegations resulted in the church delivering six reports, implicating 85 Irish priests in sexual abuse from 1975 to 2011. The reports were conducted by the Catholic Church's National Board for Safeguarding Children. Despite the 85 allegations, the report found that only six Irish priests had been convicted of sexual abuse in the thirty-six-year period.

=== The 'Grace' case ===
The 'Grace' case came to light in Ireland in 2017, as a major indicator of Ireland's ongoing issues with child sexual abuse. 'Grace,' was born with intellectual disabilities and from 1989 to 2009 she was placed in the Irish foster care system. Grace remained with the same foster family for those twenty years and was subjected to physical abuse, gross neglect and, possibly, sexual abuse. The revelations of Grace's abuse resulted in the publication of two reports, and the establishment of a Commission of investigation. According to an article published by Irish new service, RTÉ, Grace's story of abuse and neglect brings attention to the lack of framework implemented by the Irish government to prevent children from institutionalised abuse.

=== The Louise O'Keeffe case ===
The, "Louise O'Keeffe case," investigated allegations of abuse by a woman named Louise, who was abused as an eight year old in 1973, and along with 21 others, mounted allegations of abuse against Leo Hickey, the former principal of the Dunderrow National School, a primary school in Ireland. It was alleged that Leo Hickey abused these women on 400 occasions whilst he was principal of the school in the 1970s. The case was ruled on by the European Court of Human Rights and found that Irish state was liable, and that the case was indicative of the government's failure to take preventative action against sexual abuse in its schools. However, the state denied responsibility for the abuse. Leo Hickey was ordered to serve a three-year jail sentence as, despite the 400 allegations he only plead guilty to 21 charges.

== Human trafficking in Ireland ==
In 2015, the US State department stated that Ireland was a destination country for human trafficking, including sex trafficking and forced labour. Whilst the Department's report still categorised Ireland as a Tier 1 nation, meaning that the country's efforts to eliminate the issue were found to comply the minimum standards of the US, it was further noted that whilst Irish law enforcement efficiently investigated human trafficking offences, often the traffickers were not convicted.

In 2018, Ireland was downgraded, in the United States’ Trafficking of Persons Report 2018, from Tier 1 to Tier 2; Tier 2 including countries that fall below US standards in combatting human trafficking. The report found that, regarding the efforts of the Irish government, "The government has not obtained a trafficking conviction since the law was amended, in 2013; it initiated only three prosecutions in 2017 and had chronic deficiencies in victim-identification and referral." The number of newly identified cases in 2017 numbered 115, an increase on the 90 cases identified in 2015. According to the report, this increase can be accounted for by the Irish governments, "decreased," law enforcement efforts. Whilst the report did note that Ireland's, Garda Síochána, (police force), runs a dedicated email service involved with reporting trafficking, action was taken on a mere 31 emails, a number disproportionate when compared with the number of cases published by the report. The report further found that the Irish government provided, "no legally mandated psychological assistance to victims," and had dedicated little effort to, "reduce the demand for sex trafficking or forced labour."

The nationality of Trafficking victims in Ireland identified in 2017, according to the report, included, "28 Irish, 14 individuals from Romania, 12 from Indonesia, 12 from Nigeria, and the rest from Europe, Africa, South Asia, the Near East, and South America." Furthermore, it was reported that, "Victims of forced labour have been identified in domestic work, the restaurant industry, waste-management, fishing, seasonal agriculture and car-washing services." The report indicates that forced labour, especially, was an increasing issue in the country.

== Abortion rights in Ireland ==
=== The Eighth Amendment ===
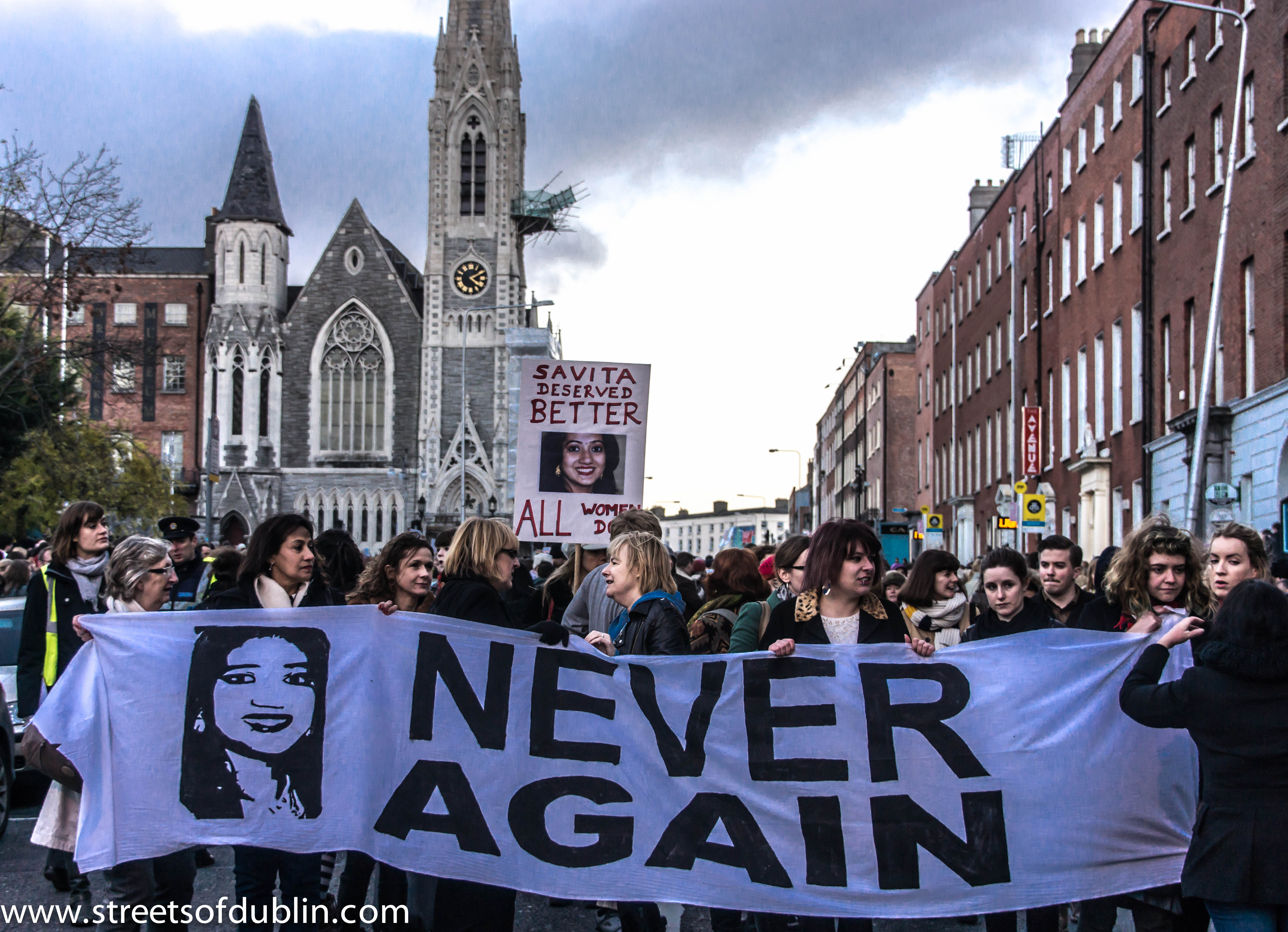
Protestors at a rally in Dublin in response the death of Savita Halappanavar. 2012

Abortion in Ireland was illegal under the Offences Against the Person Act 1861. This ban was given constitutional footing by the Eighth Amendment, added to the Irish constitution in 1983, which prohibited women from undergoing an abortion unless their lives were at risk. The aim of the amendment was to recognise the rights of an unborn child as equal to those of the pregnant women, and, this entailed that, even in cases of incest, rape and fatal foetal abnormality, Irish women's options were to carry a pregnancy to full term or travel elsewhere to receive an abortion.

==== The Death Of Savita Halappanavar ====
Debate regarding the Eighth Amendment had been ongoing since 1983 and was heightened by the case of Savita Halappanavar. Savita died at Galway University Hospital as a result of a septic miscarriage when she was about 17 weeks pregnant. Admitted to the hospital in severe discomfort, she requested an abortion after learning that a miscarriage was inevitable, but it was conditionally denied due to the existence of a fetal heartbeat. Two days later she miscarried and went into a coma. Her condition deteriorated, leading to septic shock, organ failure, and death from cardiac arrest on October 28, 2012, a week after her admittance. The story of Sativa Halappanavar's demise would help to rally support for the repeal of the Eighth Amendment and for the general liberalization of abortion law in Ireland.

==== Ireland's Abortion Referendum ====
On Friday 25 May 2018, Irish citizens voted on a referendum to determine whether the Eighth Amendment would be repealed. The Referendum on the Thirty Sixth Amendment, asked Irish citizens to change the law's focus on,"the right to life of the unborn and, with due regard to the equal right to life of the mother," to become, "Provision may be made by law for the regulation of termination of pregnancy." 3,367,556 Irish citizens participated in the referendum. The votes returned a verdict to repeal the Eighth Amendment, 66.4% to 33.6%. The results of the referendum entailed that the Irish Parliament would begin to legislate and reform abortion laws in the country. The referendum addressed one of the key areas of human rights concern found by The Irish Human Rights and Equality Commission.

== Climate change in Ireland ==
According to the United Nations Special Rapporteur, Professor David Boyd, Ireland has failed to take more effective measures to control climate change. Boyd referred to these failures as a “breach of Ireland’s human rights obligations,” and stated that the country “must take additional actions on an urgent basis,” as climate change impinges upon the right to life of Irish citizens, “a right which the Government of Ireland is legally obligated to respect, protect and fulfil.” Boyd recommended that the Irish government implement more effective measures to reduce greenhouse gas emissions, for otherwise ”these violations will expand in terms of geographic scope, severity and the number of people affected".
