= Josepha Madigan =

Irish former politician (born 1970)

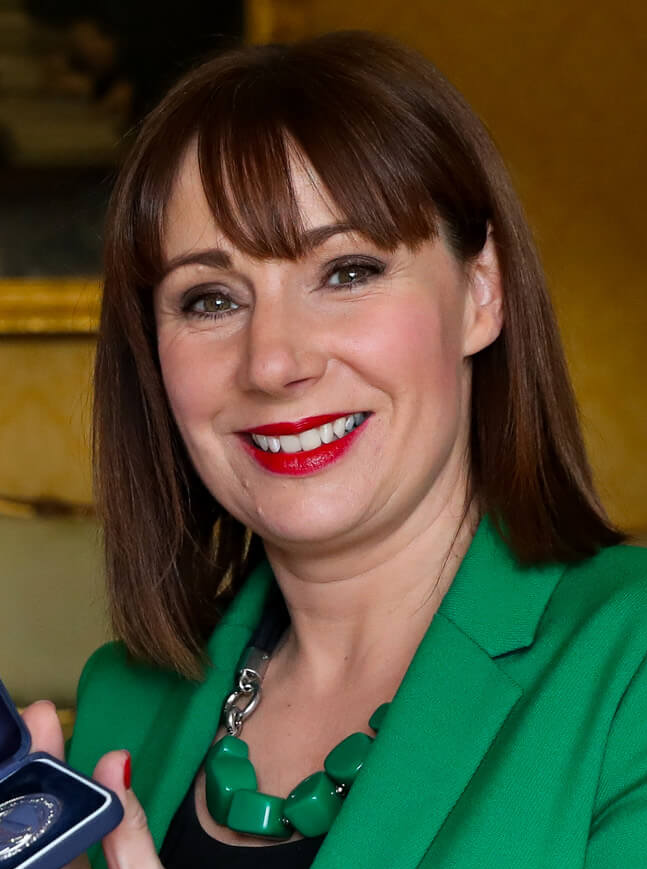
- Madigan in 2017

Minister of State
- 2020–2024: Education

Minister for Culture, Heritage and the Gaeltacht
- In office 30 November 2017 – 27 June 2020
- Taoiseach: Leo Varadkar
- Preceded by: Heather Humphreys
- Succeeded by: Catherine Martin

Chair of the Committee on Budgetary Oversight
- In office 8 July 2016 – 30 November 2017
- Preceded by: John Paul Phelan
- Succeeded by: Colm Brophy

Teachta Dála
- In office February 2016 – November 2024
- Constituency: Dublin Rathdown

Dún Laoghaire–Rathdown County Councillor
- In office May 2014 – February 2016
- Constituency: Stillorgan

Personal details
- Born: 21 May 1970 (age 56) Dublin, Ireland
- Party: Fine Gael
- Spouse: Finbarr Hayes (m. 2002)
- Children: 2
- Education: Trinity College Dublin
- Website: josephamadigan.ie

Josepha Madigan (born 21 May 1970) is an Irish former Fine Gael politician who served as Minister of State for Special Education and Inclusion from July 2020 to March 2024. She served as a Teachta Dála (TD) for the Dublin Rathdown constituency from 2016 to 2024. She served as Minister for Culture, Heritage, and the Gaeltacht from November 2017 to June 2020, and as Chair of the Committee on Budgetary Oversight from July 2016 to November 2017.

== Early and personal life ==
Madigan was born in Dublin in 1970. She attended Mount Anville Secondary School and Trinity College Dublin. She is married to Finbarr Hayes, and they have two children. Her father, Patrick Madigan, was a Fianna Fáil County Councillor in Dublin, her mother, Patricia Madigan, was a barrister who had a background in Fine Gael. She and her family live in Mount Merrion. Madigan is a survivor of sexual assault.

== Legal career ==
Madigan is a qualified solicitor, who practised in family law for twenty years, prior to her election to Dáil Éireann. She is also certified as a mediator by the Mediators' Institute of Ireland (MII) and is a previous Council member of the MII. She is a former Specialist Liaison Officer for Family Mediation in the MII.

Madigan is the author of the first book in Ireland on mediation: Appropriate Dispute Resolution in Ireland, a handbook for family lawyers and their clients (Jordan Publishing, 2012). She has also self-published a novel called Negligent Behaviour.

== Political career ==
=== County Councillor (2014–2016) ===
Madigan served as a councillor for the local electoral area of Stillorgan on Dún Laoghaire–Rathdown County Council, from May 2014 until her election as a TD in 2016.

Madigan issued a leaflet in 2014 claimed that providing accommodation for Travellers in her constituency would be "a waste of valuable resources". When asked about this later, Madigan claimed "Some people won't want to live beside people in halting sites [...] there might be more crime, that there might be anti-social behaviour".

=== Dáil Éireann ===
Madigan was elected to the 32nd Dáil at the 2016 general election as a Fine Gael TD for the Dublin Rathdown constituency, defeating sitting Fine Gael TD Alan Shatter by nearly 1,000 votes. She was appointed Chair of the Committee on Budgetary Oversight in July 2017.

She was a member of the Public Accounts Committee. She introduced a private member's bill to reduce the waiting time for divorce in Ireland from four years to two, which was passed by the Dáil.

On 30 November 2017, Madigan was appointed to the cabinet as Minister for Culture, Heritage and the Gaeltacht, in a reshuffle following the resignation of the Tánaiste Frances Fitzgerald.

On 29 March 2018, Fine Gael leader Leo Varadkar appointed Madigan as the coordinator for the party's Yes campaign in the referendum to repeal the Eighth Amendment.

She was re-elected at the 2020 general election, taking the third seat behind Green Party Deputy Leader Catherine Martin and party colleague Neale Richmond. On 1 July 2020, Madigan was appointed by the new government as Minister of State at the Department of Education with special responsibility for special education and inclusion. On 14 January 2021, Madigan came under fire for describing children without additional needs as 'normal' while speaking in the Dáil. "We all know that even for normal children remote teaching is difficult but for children who have additional needs it is particularly difficult," she said. Later that day on Twitter, the minister said she 'sincerely apologises for the language she used.' "It is absolutely not what I meant to say."

On 20 January 2021, speaking on RTÉ's Today with Claire Byrne, Madigan compared children with additional needs not attending school to the mother and baby homes. "We've spent the last week talking about mother and baby homes, where our most vulnerable were left to their own devices in less than satisfactory conditions and we're now allowing further anxiety and upset to be placed on the shoulders of parents whose children desperately need to go back to school." The Final Report of the Commission of Investigation into Mother and Baby Homes and Related Matters was published the week prior to Madigan's comments. Madigan later apologised in a statement: "I am, as are all involved in supporting these children [children with additional needs], passionate about vindicating their rights and in reaching for an analogy I chose poorly. I apologise fully."

Shortly after the first report of the Creeslough explosion on 7 October 2022, Madigan tweeted that she hoped "they find the culprits" and, after being criticised as irresponsible and insensitive, Madigan quickly deleted the tweet.

On 22 March 2024, Madigan announced that she would resign as Minister of State and would not contest the next general election.

== Maria Bailey legal claim ==
In 2019, Madigan received widespread coverage for her role in the personal injury legal claim of Fine Gael politician, Maria Bailey. It was alleged that Madigan's law practice, Madigan Solicitors, advised Bailey on her claim, however, Madigan refused to make any comments on this citing client-solicitor confidentiality. In July 2019, an internal unpublished Fine Gael probe into the affair cleared Madigan of any wrongdoing in regard to the claim. In late July 2019, the Irish Independent reported that "it is now known that she advised Ms Bailey in the early stages of the claim". It was also reported that Madigan's firm would earn €11,500 in fees if the Maria Bailey case had been successful.

Oireachtas
Preceded by Heather Humphreys	Minister for Culture, Heritage and the Gaeltacht; 2017–2020	Succeeded by Catherine Martin
New office	Minister of State at the Department of Education; 2020–2024	Succeeded by Hildegarde Naughton

Dáil	Election	Deputy (Party)	Deputy (Party)	Deputy (Party)	Deputy (Party)
32nd	2016	Catherine Martin (GP)	Shane Ross (Ind.)	Josepha Madigan (FG)	3 seats 2016–2024
33rd	2020	Catherine Martin (GP)	Neale Richmond (FG)	Josepha Madigan (FG)	3 seats 2016–2024
34th	2024	Sinéad Gibney (SD)	Neale Richmond (FG)	Maeve O'Connell (FG)	Shay Brennan (FF)
