= Sinéad Gibney =

Irish politician

Sinéad Gibney TD
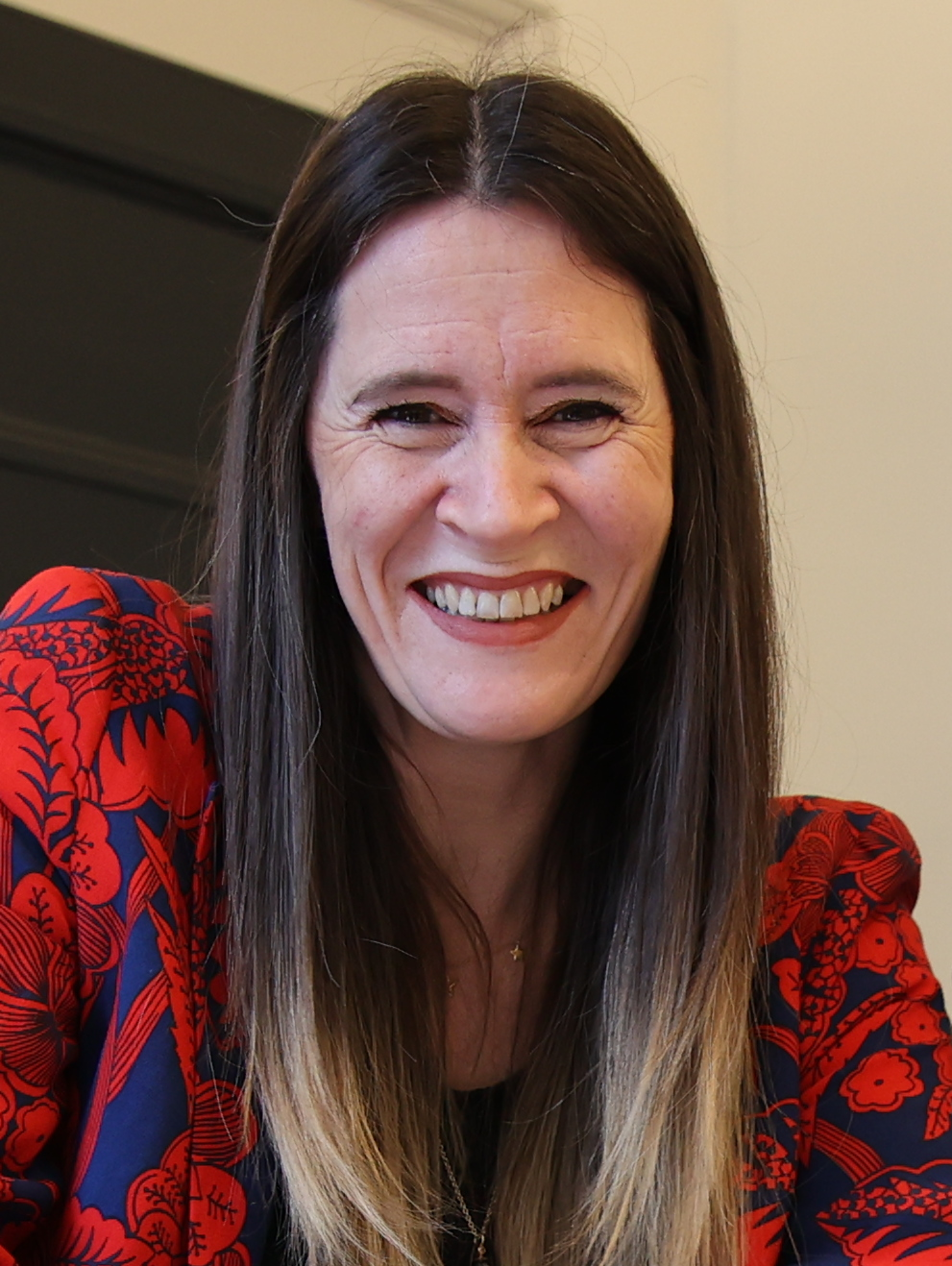
- Gibney in 2024

Teachta Dála
- Incumbent
- Assumed office November 2024
- Constituency: Dublin Rathdown

Personal details
- Born: 1976/1977 (age 49–50)
- Party: Social Democrats
- Spouse: Mark
- Children: 1
- Education: Ulster University; Trinity College Dublin; Dún Laoghaire IADT; University College Dublin

Sinéad Gibney (born 1976/1977) is an Irish Social Democrats politician who has been a Teachta Dála (TD) for the Dublin Rathdown constituency since the 2024 general election. She is the Social Democrats Spokesperson for Enterprise, Tourism and Employment; Arts, Media, Communications, Culture and Sport; and Defence.

== Early life and education ==
Gibney was born and grew up in Blackrock.

Gibney graduated with a Bachelor of Arts (BA) in History and Politics from Ulster University. During her time at Ulster, Gibney was a Student Union officer and president. She went on to complete a Master of Science (MSc) in IT and Education at Trinity College Dublin; a postgraduate certificate in Cyberpsychology at Dún Laoghaire Institute of Art, Design and Technology (IADT); and another MSc in Equality Studies at University College Dublin (UCD).

== Early career ==
Before entering politics, Gibney was the Chief Commissioner of the Irish Human Rights and Equality Commission (IHREC). Gibney resigned from the position ahead of her entering national politics in 2024. Gibney was previously chair of the single-parent support organisation "One Family", and previously worked as head of social action at Google.

== Political career ==
Gibney ran for a seat on Dún Laoghaire–Rathdown County Council in the Blackrock area at the 2019 local elections on behalf of the Social Democrats, but was not successful. In 2024, she stood for the party in Dublin at the 2024 European Parliament elections, placing 9th. Following the European elections, Gibney publicly discussed the financial cost of campaigning on such a large scale, revealing a personal loss of €20,000 after falling just 440 votes short of the 18,836 required to reclaim her €1,800 deposit. Running in the Dublin constituency, Gibney sold her car to help fund her campaign, raised €15,000 through crowdfunding, and received €25,000 from the Social Democrats, with total expenses amounting to €60,000. Speaking after her elimination, she described the outcome as "gut-wrenching" and highlighted the challenges faced by smaller parties with limited resources.

In May 2024, Gibney's decision to step down as IHREC chief commissioner to run for the European Parliament raised concerns about politicisation and conflicts of interest. Internal meetings acknowledged risks to IHREC's impartiality, leading to governance measures like updating its risk register and limiting Gibney's duties. While no conflicts were logged, her attendance at a leadership forum against most commissioners' advice drew criticism. Gibney defended her actions, citing her commitment to a professional handover. She denied her departure was tied to pay discussions and highlighted personal financial sacrifices for her campaign, amid earlier informal talks with the Social Democrats.

At the 2024 general election, Gibney was elected to the Dáil in the Dublin Rathdown constituency.

In October 2026, Gibney condemned the effective ban on author Sally Rooney's books in the UK, arguing that the application of terrorism legislation to her support for Palestine Action amounts to censorship. She called on Foreign Affairs Minister Helen McEntee to raise the issue directly with the UK government and express Ireland’s concerns about creeping censorship and authoritarianism. Gibney argued that those who oppose genocide and war crimes should be supported, not punished.

== Political views ==
Gibney supports an expanded social democratic model in Ireland, including stronger public services and greater state intervention in areas such as housing and childcare. She has described herself as unapologetically left-wing and aligned with progressive causes even when they are politically contentious. On immigration, she supports a pro-immigration position, particularly regarding international protection and asylum policy. She has also defended trans rights, prisoner rights, and anti-racism measures. Gibney supported both Yes positions in the 2024 Irish constitutional referendums.

Gibney has stated she supports addressing the challenges and opportunities of artificial intelligence with a focus on its potential to create a more balanced working life and increase leisure time. She views AI as a progressive force if managed effectively, rather than solely as a threat to jobs.

In March 2024, Gibney criticised housing policy delays in the EU, particularly Green MEP Ciarán Cuffe's late push for an EU-wide housing plan, which she believes should have been prioritised earlier.

Gibney has expressed disappointment in Clare Daly's comments on Russia and China but commended Daly's stance on Palestine.

Amongst political figures Gibney has said she admires are Catherine Connolly, Alexandria Ocasio-Cortez, Bernie Sanders, Francesca Albanese, Zack Polanski, and Hannah Spencer.

Gibney has argued for moving Irish politics away from clientelist or highly localised political culture, favouring a more policy-focused national approach to governance.

== Personal life ==
Gibney became a single mother at age 23. She is married to Mark. She has been open about quitting drinking and the positive impact sobriety has had on her life. Gibney's cousin is the comedian Des Bishop. Two have helped each other with their sobriety.

In March 2025 in the Dáil Éireann Register of Interests, Gibney declared that she rents out a property in Blackrock, Dublin and did not list her occupation as a landlord, indicating her rental income in the relevant period did not exceed €2,600. She also declared in the Register of Interests that this is the sole property she owns.

| Dáil | Election | Deputy (Party) | Deputy (Party) | Deputy (Party) | Deputy (Party) |
|---|---|---|---|---|---|
| 32nd | 2016 | Catherine Martin (GP) | Shane Ross (Ind.) | Josepha Madigan (FG) | 3 seats 2016–2024 |
| 33rd | 2020 | Catherine Martin (GP) | Neale Richmond (FG) | Josepha Madigan (FG) | 3 seats 2016–2024 |
| 34th | 2024 | Sinéad Gibney (SD) | Neale Richmond (FG) | Maeve O'Connell (FG) | Shay Brennan (FF) |
