= Maeve O'Connell =

Irish politician

Maeve O'Connell TD
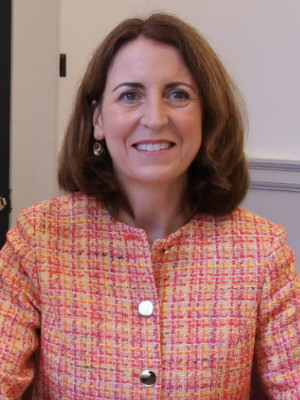
- O'Connell in 2024

Teachta Dála
- Incumbent
- Assumed office November 2024
- Constituency: Dublin Rathdown

Personal details
- Party: Fine Gael
- Spouse: Colm Brophy (m. 1998)

Maeve O'Connell is an Irish Fine Gael politician who has been a Teachta Dála (TD) for the Dublin Rathdown constituency since the 2024 general election.

== Career ==
She has lectured in law and governance at Technological University Dublin. She is a barrister and was called to the bar in 1998.

O'Connell was a member of Dún Laoghaire–Rathdown County Council from 2019 to 2024 for the Stillorgan area.

== Personal life ==
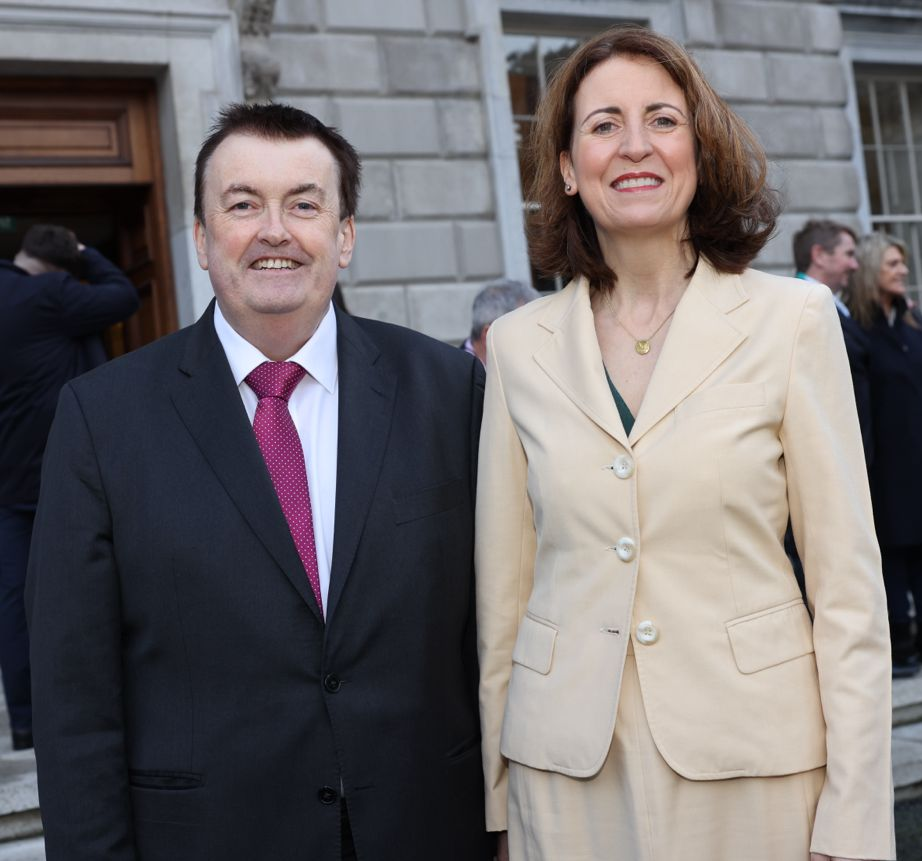
O'Connell and her husband Colm Brophy in 2024

She is married to fellow Fine Gael TD Colm Brophy.

Dáil	Election	Deputy (Party)	Deputy (Party)	Deputy (Party)	Deputy (Party)
32nd	2016	Catherine Martin (GP)	Shane Ross (Ind.)	Josepha Madigan (FG)	3 seats 2016–2024
33rd	2020	Catherine Martin (GP)	Neale Richmond (FG)	Josepha Madigan (FG)	3 seats 2016–2024
34th	2024	Sinéad Gibney (SD)	Neale Richmond (FG)	Maeve O'Connell (FG)	Shay Brennan (FF)
