= 2009 Dublin South by-election =

By-election to the 30th Dáil

- 5 June 2009
- Turnout: 52,479 (57.8%)
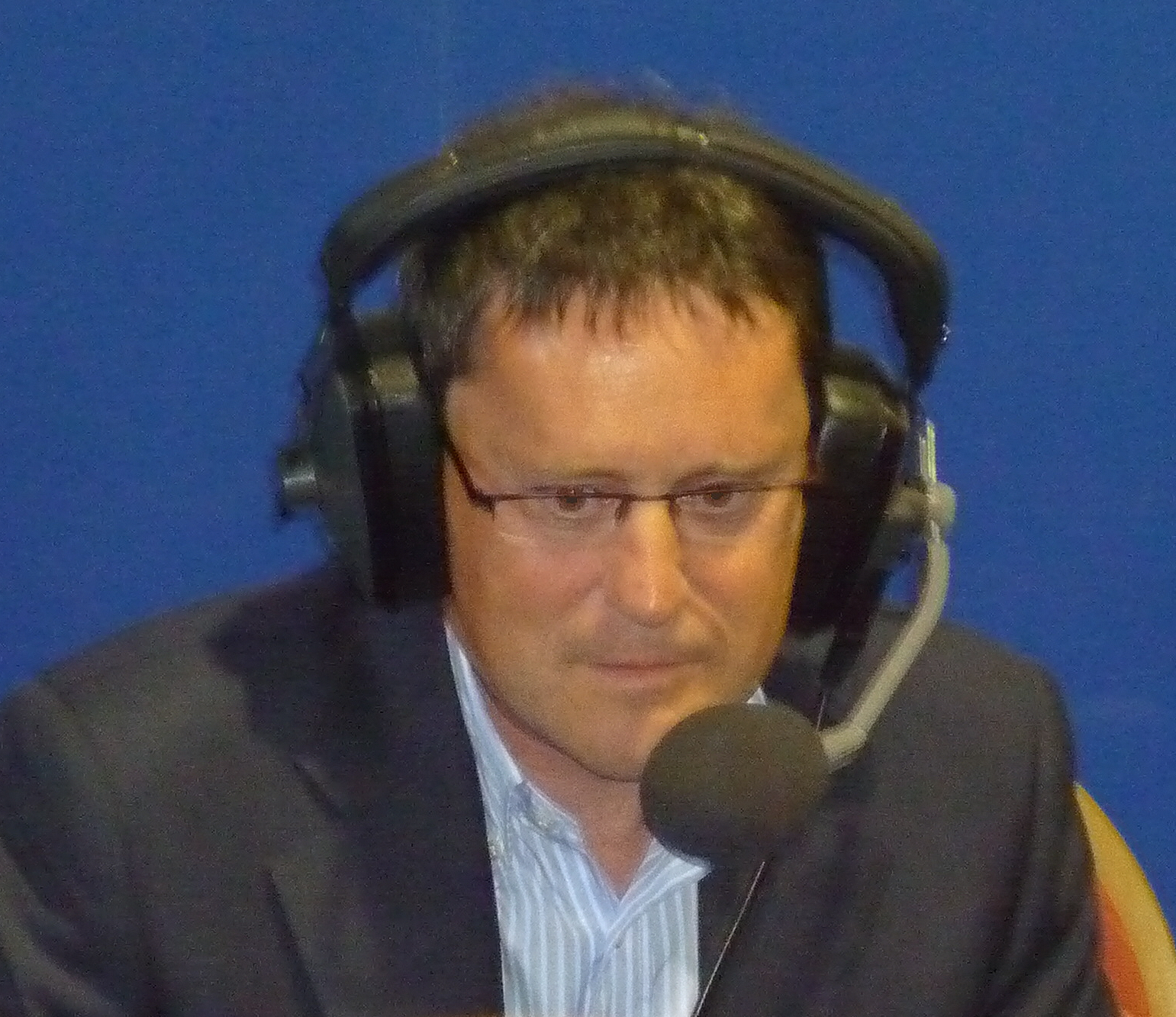

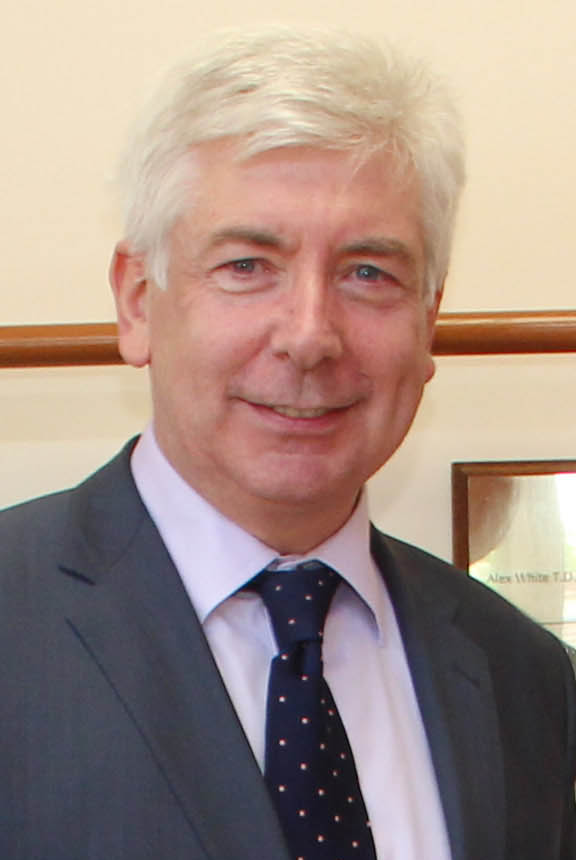

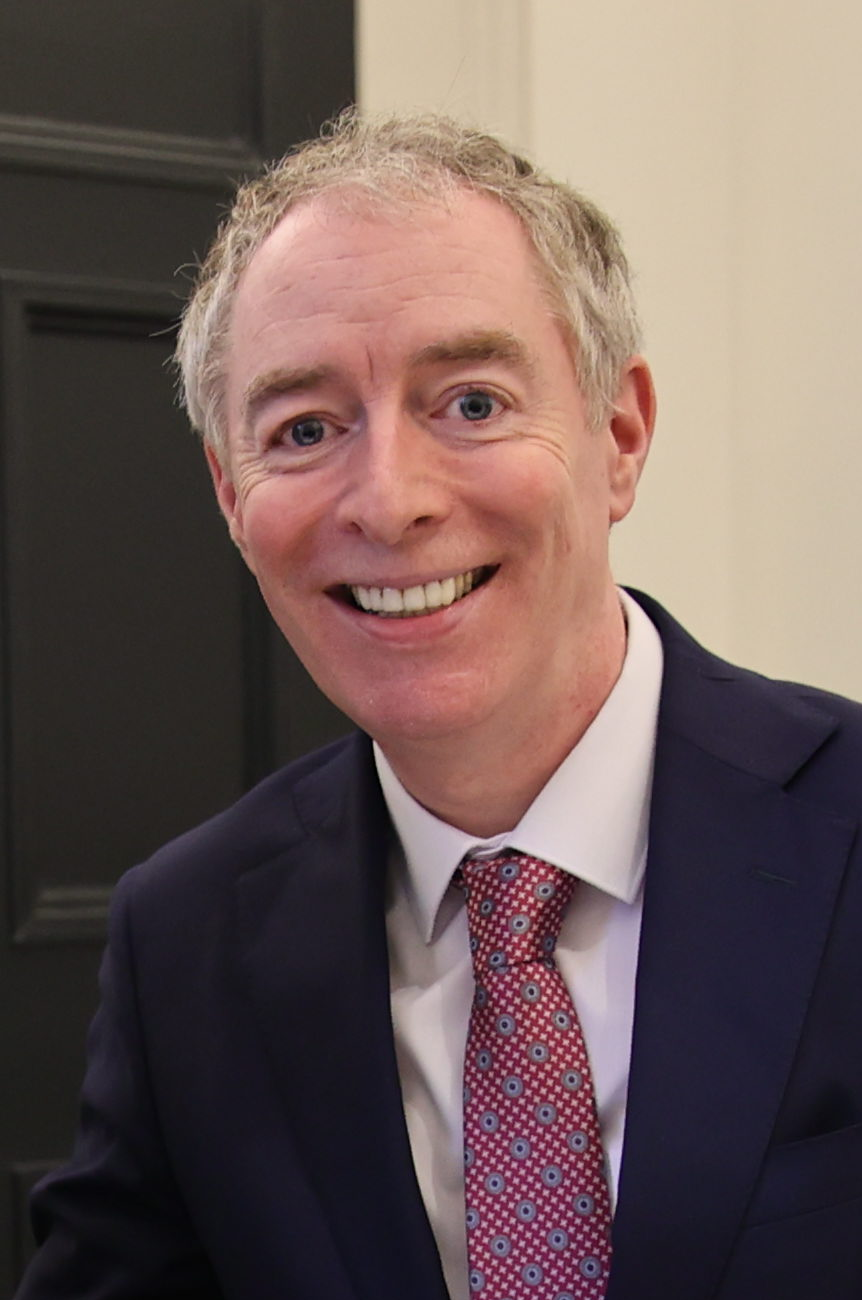
Nominee	George Lee	Alex White	Shay Brennan
Party	Fine Gael	Labour	Fianna Fáil
First preferences	27,768	10,294	9,250
Percentage	53.4%	19.8%	17.8%
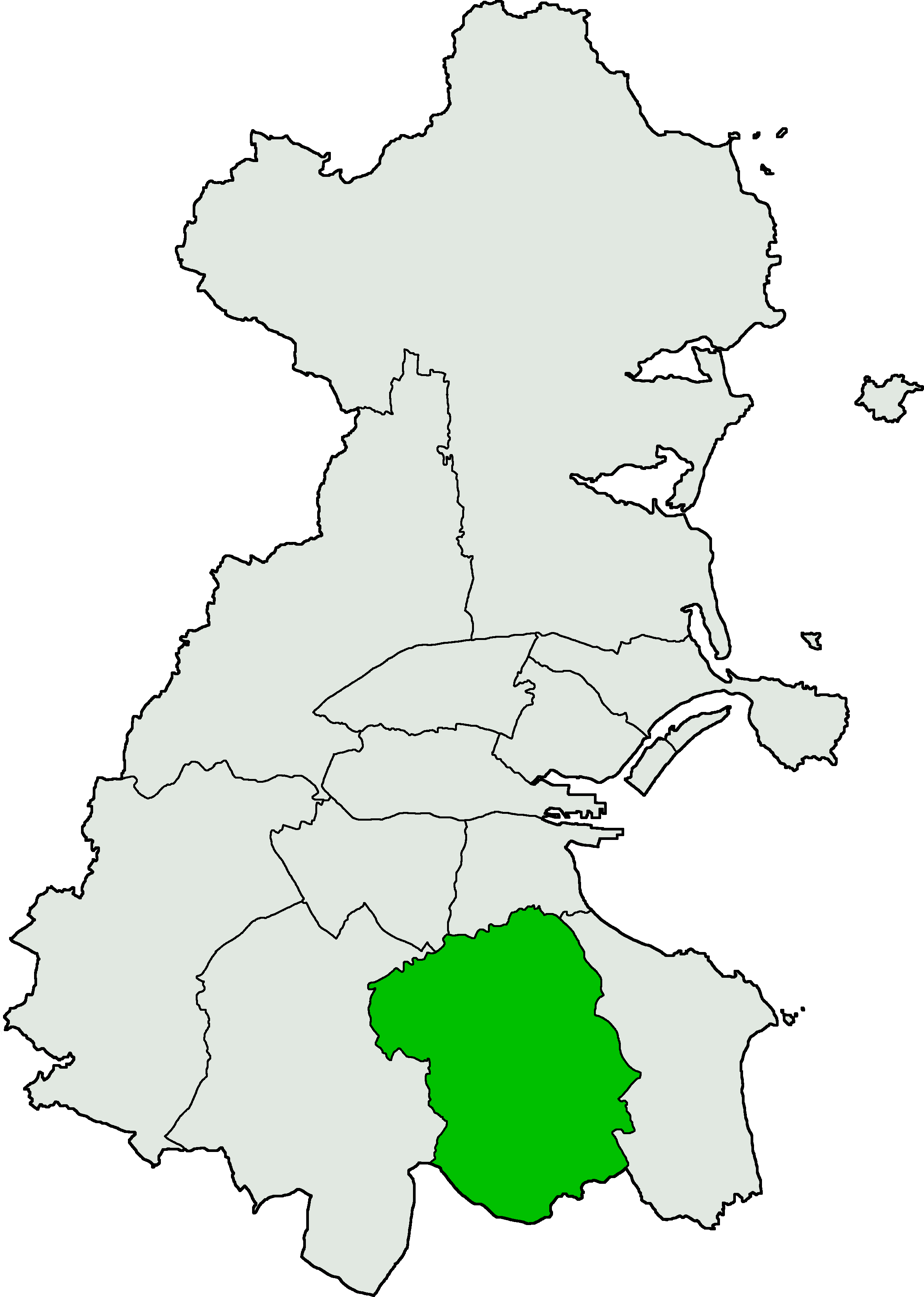
- Dublin South shown within County Dublin
TD before election
Séamus Brennan
Fianna Fáil
TD after election
George Lee
Fine Gael

A Dáil by-election was held in the constituency of Dublin South in Ireland on Friday, 5 June 2009, to fill a vacancy in the 30th Dáil. It followed the death of Fianna Fáil Teachta Dála (TD) Séamus Brennan on 9 July 2008. It was held on the same day as the 2009 European and local elections and by-election in Dublin Central.

== Timing of by-election ==
Séamus Brennan died on 9 July 2008. At the time, there was no legal requirement on when to hold a by-election in Ireland but it was generally held within six months. On 3 February 2009, a Labour Party motion to issue the writ of election was opposed by the Fianna Fáil–Green Party government and was defeated by 70 to 74. On 13 May 2009, a government motion to issue the writ was agreed. The Minister for the Environment, Heritage and Local Government signed on order on that date setting 5 June as the date for the by-election.

== Candidates ==
Eight candidates contested the vacant seat.

== Result ==
Fine Gael candidate George Lee was elected on the first count. He took his seat on 9 June.

2009 Dublin South by-election
Party	Candidate	FPv%	Count
Party	Candidate	FPv%	1
Fine Gael	George Lee	53.4	27,768
Labour	Alex White	19.8	10,294
Fianna Fáil	Shay Brennan	17.8	9,250
Green	Elizabeth Davidson	3.5	1,846
Sinn Féin	Shaun Tracey	3.3	1,705
Independent	Ross O'Mullane	1.2	650
Independent	Frank O'Gorman	0.7	351
Independent	Noel O'Gara	0.3	172
Electorate: 90,802 Valid: 52,036 Spoilt: 443 (0.8%) Quota: 26,019 Turnout: 52,479 (57.8%)

== Aftermath ==
George Lee resigned from the Dáil on 8 February 2010 after serving 8 months as a TD. The seat remained vacant until the dissolution of the 30th Dáil on 1 February 2011.
