= Shay Brennan (politician) =

Irish politician

Shay Brennan TD
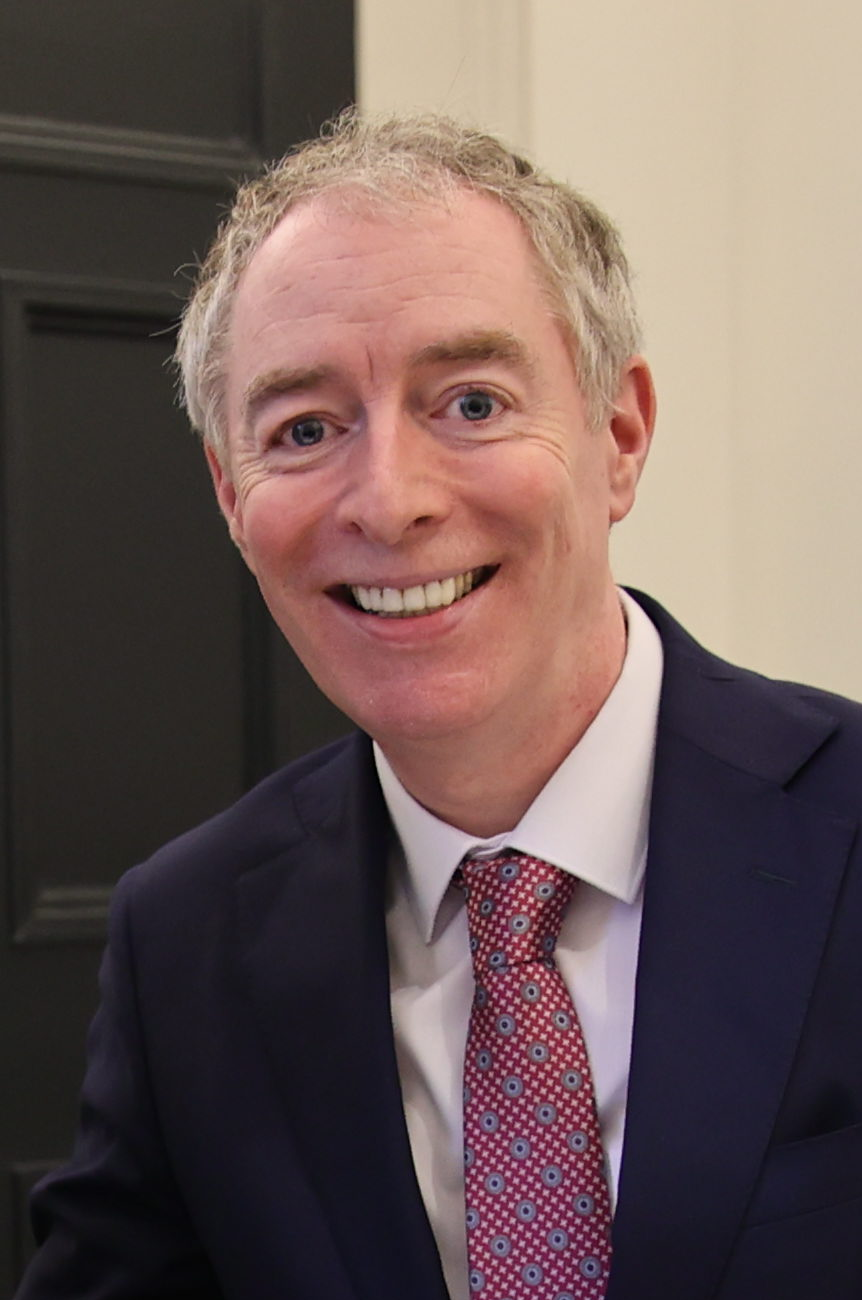
- Brennan in 2024

Teachta Dála
- Incumbent
- Assumed office November 2024
- Constituency: Dublin Rathdown

Personal details
- Born: 1973/1974 (age 51–52)
- Party: Fianna Fáil
- Parent: Séamus Brennan (father)

Shay Brennan (born 1973/1974) is an Irish Fianna Fáil politician who has been a Teachta Dála (TD) for the Dublin Rathdown constituency since the 2024 general election.

He is the son of Séamus Brennan, and unsuccessfully contested the 2009 Dublin South by-election which followed the death of his father in 2008.

Brennan was a member of Dún Laoghaire–Rathdown County Council from 2014 until his election to the Dáil in 2024.

Dáil	Election	Deputy (Party)	Deputy (Party)	Deputy (Party)	Deputy (Party)
32nd	2016	Catherine Martin (GP)	Shane Ross (Ind.)	Josepha Madigan (FG)	3 seats 2016–2024
33rd	2020	Catherine Martin (GP)	Neale Richmond (FG)	Josepha Madigan (FG)	3 seats 2016–2024
34th	2024	Sinéad Gibney (SD)	Neale Richmond (FG)	Maeve O'Connell (FG)	Shay Brennan (FF)
