= Family Carers Ireland =

Irish non-profit organisation

Family Carers Ireland is a non-profit organisation based in Dublin, Leinster.

== History ==
It started as The Carers Association in 1987, and was the first national carers association for lobbying government, representing family carers and advocate for carers rights in Ireland. The national census of 2006 shows that there are 160,917 people who stated that they are carers and almost 41,000 of these carers are providing 43 or more hours of care each week. The association estimates that carers provide 194 million hours of care a year to the value of about 2.5 billion Euros to the economy. Approximately 33,000 full-time carers qualify for the Carers Allowance from the government. This Allowance is means tested. The government has committed to developing a National Carers Strategy by the middle of 2008.

The Carers Association was the subject of a chapter-length study in Care Work: The Quest for Security.

== Merger with Caring For Carers Ireland ==
Caring For Carers Ireland was a national care organisation in Ireland that provided training on homecare and computer skills to family carers, as well as talks on the issues affecting family carers.

In addition to assisting carers directly, it collaborated with other care organisations and academics in order to raise awareness of issues faced by carers, including by facilitating access to carers for interview, and convening conferences of care organisations.

It was founded in County Clare, around 1988-1990, by Soroptimists.

Its importance in social care in Ireland was acknowledged by multiple government ministers.

Around 2015–2016, it merged with The Carers Association to form Family Carers Ireland.

== See also ==
- Caregivers
- Carers rights movement
- Caregiving and dementia
- Caring for Carers Ireland
