= George Lee (journalist) =

Irish economist, journalist (born 1962)

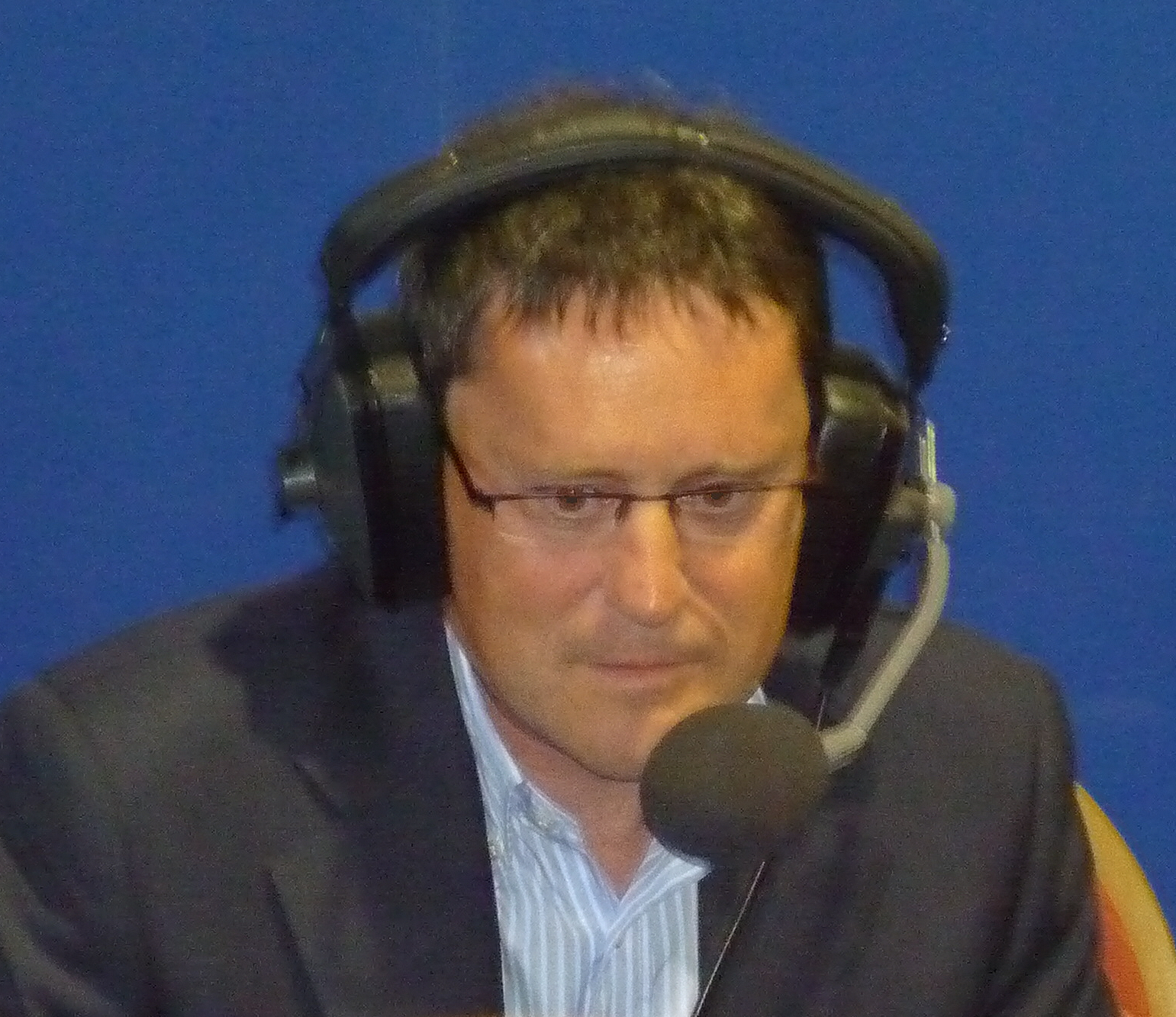
- Lee in June 2009

Teachta Dála
- In office 6 June 2009 – 8 February 2010
- Constituency: Dublin South

Personal details
- Born: 27 September 1962 (age 63) Templeogue, Dublin, Ireland
- Party: Fine Gael (2009–2010)
- Spouse: Mary Lee
- Children: 2
- Education: University College Dublin; London School of Economics
- Occupation: Journalist; Economist; Broadcaster; former Politician

George Lee (born 27 September 1962) is an Irish economist, journalist, television and radio presenter, and former Fine Gael politician. He has worked for RTÉ since 1992. Since 2019, he has been Environment Correspondent for RTÉ News. He previously was Economics Editor in 1996.

Lee left RTÉ and became a Teachta Dála (TD) for the Dublin South constituency in June 2009, winning a by-election with a 53.4% majority and was referred to as a "celebrity TD". On 8 February 2010, Lee announced his resignation both from Fine Gael and from Dáil Éireann, having spent nine months in politics. His reasoning was that he had "virtually no influence or input". He returned to RTÉ in May 2010, and presented Mind Your Business, followed by The Business on RTÉ Radio 1 from 2010. During his time in RTÉ News, he was named Irish Journalist of the Year for uncovering a major tax evasion and overcharging scandal at National Irish Bank.

== Early and personal life ==
Lee's father was a motor mechanic and his mother was a hairdresser. Lee was the seventh in a family of eight children and grew up in Templeogue, Dublin. He attended Coláiste Éanna, a Christian Brothers' School in the Dublin suburb of Ballyroan. Lee is a graduate of University College Dublin and holds an MSc in Economics from the London School of Economics where his specialist area was labour economics and unemployment.

He is married to Mary Lee (née Kitson), they have two children, Alison and Harry, and lives in Cabinteely. Lee famously travelled to work in RTÉ using a Segway, once giving it a test ride live on Tubridy Tonight.

== Career ==
Lee joined the civil service as an executive officer in the Central Statistics Office. Two years later he started at University College Dublin where he studied economics under academics such as Brendan Walsh and Peter Neary.

Prior to his move into broadcasting, he lectured in NUI, Galway and then worked as a journalist with The Sunday Business Post. Lee was also a Senior Economist at Riada Stockbrokers. He also worked as Treasury Economist with FTI and as a research economist with the Central Bank of Ireland.

From 1992 to 2009 he worked in RTÉ, the public broadcasting service of Ireland. He was appointed Economics Editor with RTÉ in 1996. Lee was named Irish Journalist of the Year, along with Charlie Bird, in 1998 after they uncovered a major tax evasion and overcharging scandal at National Irish Bank. He has devised, researched and presented several television series, including Moneybox, More To Do, Winds of Change, and Beyond the Berlin Wall. He is thought of as an "economics guru". He left RTÉ "in the late 1990s" to work for BCP Stockbrokers. He left the job and returned to his RTÉ post the next day.

Before embarking on his political career, he filmed a four-part series based on the fall of the Berlin Wall in 2008. It was aired on RTÉ One in November 2009.

George Lee was parodied in the 1990s comedy Bull Island, where he was seen "menacingly staring down the lens of a camera", and has also been featured on RTÉ 2fm's Nob Nation.

=== Political career ===
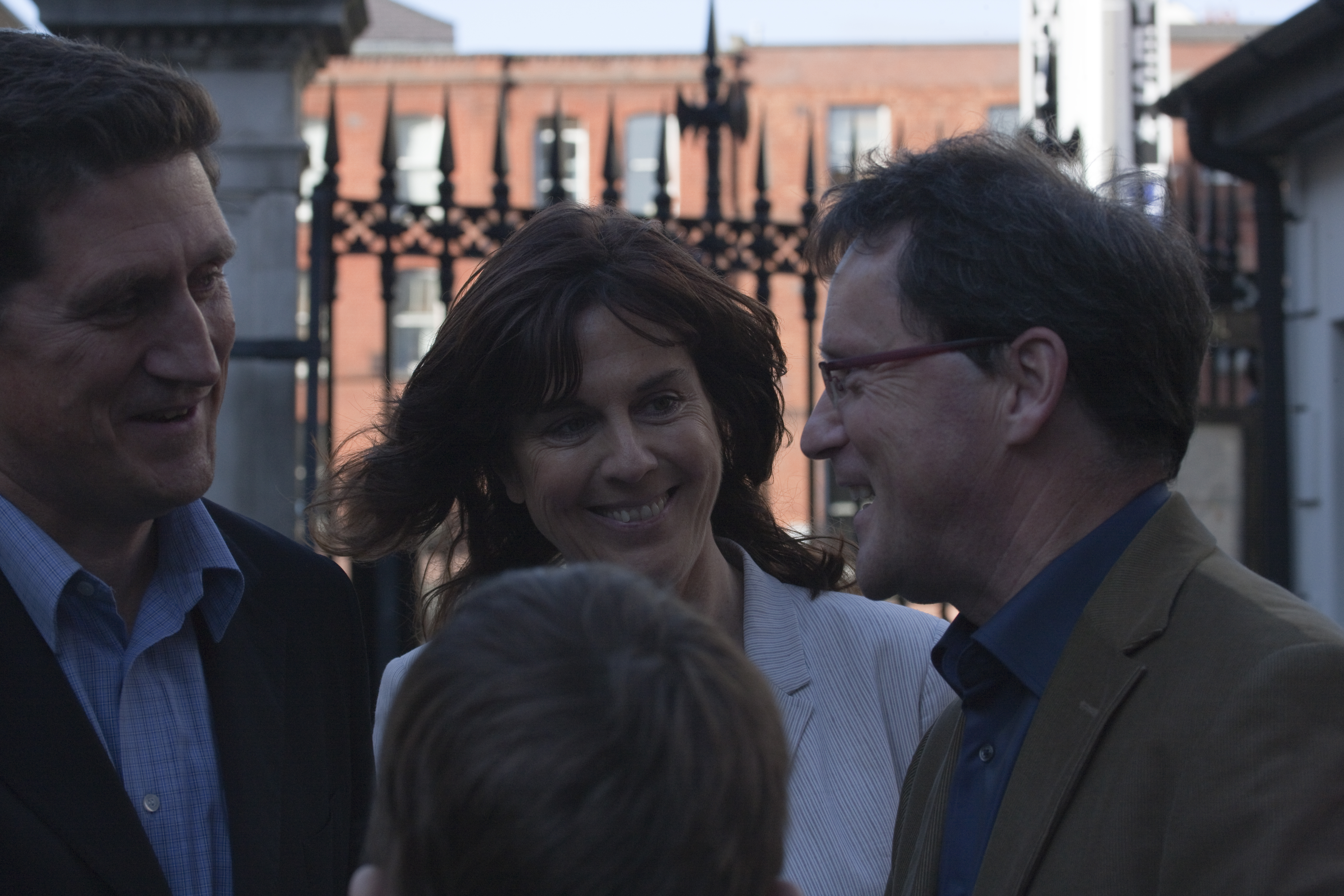
Lee (right) with Eamon Ryan (left) and Déirdre de Búrca (centre) at the second Lisbon Treaty referendum.

On 5 May 2009 on the News at One on RTÉ Radio 1, Lee announced that he was resigning as Economic Editor with RTÉ and announced his intention to seek the Fine Gael nomination for the Dublin South by-election in 2009. Lee took a year's unpaid leave from RTÉ in May 2009. On 6 May 2009 Lee was chosen as the Fine Gael candidate for the by-election. He was the only candidate for the nomination.

He was elected on the first count to represent Dublin South on 6 June 2009. He received over 53% of the 1st preference vote. In total he received 27,768 1st preference votes. His RTÉ position was filled by Europe editor Sean Whelan, but only as correspondent. Instead, David Murphy was promoted to Business Editor. When elected, Lee was referred to as a "Celebrity TD".

In an opinion poll concerning support for possible candidates in the 2011 presidential election conducted by the Sunday Independent in October 2009, Lee came third, receiving 12% support, in front of former Taoiseach Bertie Ahern among other high-profile politicians.

Lee highlighted the failure of EMPG, the holding company for US publisher Houghton Mifflin Harcourt, and the potential impact on the Irish taxpayers of the loans given by Anglo Irish Bank to the investors in EMPG on 13 January 2010. Lee saw this as another example for the urgent need of an investigation into the Irish banking crisis.

=== Resignation from politics ===
On 8 February 2010 he announced his resignation from Fine Gael and from Dáil Éireann, due to having "virtually no influence or input" into shaping Fine Gael's economic policies at a time of economic upheaval. It emerged that on 2 February, Lee met with the Fine Gael leader Enda Kenny and told him of his intention to resign. Kenny then offered Lee the frontbench position as spokesman on economic planning. Speaking to reporters outside Leinster House soon after his announcement, Lee said it would have been dishonest of him to accept the position: "I had absolutely no input for nine months. I think I had to be honest with myself and honest with the electorate about that and not pretend." Asked if his resignation was a vote of no confidence in Kenny, Lee said there were "certainly lots of large mutterings at the moment in relation to the leader's position". He said he had "minimal involvement" with Fine Gael finance spokesman Richard Bruton. "I had a maximum of two or three conversations with Richard Bruton in a total nine months period. I don’t know how my relationship is with [him]" Lee said.

Kenny noted Lee had been appointed chair of the party's committee on economic policy and also its forum. "I had anticipated a very important role for [George Lee] in the coming period with Fine Gael." Kenny's spokesman later dismissed the proposition that the resignation had implications for his leadership. He cited the public endorsement of Kenny by 20 Dáil deputies over the course of the weekend. Former Fine Gael leader Michael Noonan said he was surprised at the decision: "I thought that George Lee was fitting in well", adding that he believed he would have been a cabinet member in a Fine Gael-led government.

George Lee was criticised after his resignation by Senator Eoghan Harris, who was speaking on the Lunchtime programme of Newstalk Radio. Harris suggested financial considerations and long working hours of politicians were the reasons why Lee resigned. Fine Gael TD Brian Hayes, who was Lee's campaign manager in the Dublin South by-election, said that in discussions with Lee, the latter had complained about "a major reduction in his income" since leaving RTÉ to become a Dáil backbencher. Lee denied that financial considerations had anything to do with his decision to quit politics.

=== Return to RTÉ ===
RTÉ received a letter from Lee confirming his intentions to return after his leave of absence. The Sunday Tribune said on 14 February 2010 that he would have to wait for three months before returning to RTÉ. Exactly a year after leaving RTÉ, he returned to the broadcaster on 5 May 2010. He worked as an advisor on the RTÉ business desk. He presented Mind Your Business on RTÉ Radio 1 on Saturday Mornings as a summer replacement for The Business.

When John Murray moved to present his own programme, Lee took over The Business slot on 4 September 2010 on Saturday mornings on RTÉ Radio 1. In addition to the radio edition, Lee has presented a televised version on RTÉ One, also titled The Business.

Lee has been Environment Correspondent for RTÉ since 27 June 2019.

| Dáil | Election | Deputy (Party) | Deputy (Party) | Deputy (Party) | Deputy (Party) | Deputy (Party) | Deputy (Party) | Deputy (Party) |
|---|---|---|---|---|---|---|---|---|
| 2nd | 1921 | Thomas Kelly (SF) | Daniel McCarthy (SF) | Constance Markievicz (SF) | Cathal Ó Murchadha (SF) | 4 seats 1921–1923 | | |
| 3rd | 1922 | Thomas Kelly (PT-SF) | Daniel McCarthy (PT-SF) | William O'Brien (Lab) | Myles Keogh (Ind.) | 4 seats 1921–1923 | | |
| 4th | 1923 | Philip Cosgrave (CnaG) | Daniel McCarthy (CnaG) | Constance Markievicz (Rep) | Myles Keogh (Ind.) | Cathal Ó Murchadha (Rep) | Michael Hayes (CnaG) | Peadar Doyle (CnaG) |
| 4th | 1923 by-election | Philip Cosgrave (CnaG) | Daniel McCarthy (CnaG) | Constance Markievicz (Rep) | Myles Keogh (Ind.) | Cathal Ó Murchadha (Rep) | Hugh Kennedy (CnaG) | Peadar Doyle (CnaG) |
| 4th | March 1924 by-election | James O'Mara (CnaG) | Daniel McCarthy (CnaG) | Constance Markievicz (Rep) | Myles Keogh (Ind.) | Cathal Ó Murchadha (Rep) | Hugh Kennedy (CnaG) | Peadar Doyle (CnaG) |
| 4th | November 1924 by-election | James O'Mara (CnaG) | Daniel McCarthy (CnaG) | Constance Markievicz (Rep) | Myles Keogh (Ind.) | Cathal Ó Murchadha (Rep) | Seán Lemass (SF) | Peadar Doyle (CnaG) |
| 4th | 1925 by-election | James O'Mara (CnaG) | Thomas Hennessy (CnaG) | Constance Markievicz (Rep) | Myles Keogh (Ind.) | Cathal Ó Murchadha (Rep) | Seán Lemass (SF) | Peadar Doyle (CnaG) |
| 5th | 1927 (Jun) | James Beckett (CnaG) | Vincent Rice (NL) | Constance Markievicz (FF) | Myles Keogh (Ind.) | Thomas Lawlor (Lab) | Seán Lemass (FF) | Peadar Doyle (CnaG) |
| 5th | 1927 by-election | James Beckett (CnaG) | Vincent Rice (NL) | Thomas Hennessy (CnaG) | Myles Keogh (Ind.) | Thomas Lawlor (Lab) | Seán Lemass (FF) | Peadar Doyle (CnaG) |
| 6th | 1927 (Sep) | James Beckett (CnaG) | Robert Briscoe (FF) | Thomas Hennessy (CnaG) | Myles Keogh (CnaG) | Frank Kerlin (FF) | Seán Lemass (FF) | Peadar Doyle (CnaG) |
| 7th | 1932 | James Beckett (CnaG) | Robert Briscoe (FF) | Thomas Hennessy (CnaG) | Myles Keogh (CnaG) | James Lynch (FF) | Seán Lemass (FF) | Peadar Doyle (CnaG) |
| 8th | 1933 | James Beckett (CnaG) | Robert Briscoe (FF) | James McGuire (CnaG) | Thomas Kelly (FF) | James Lynch (FF) | Seán Lemass (FF) | Peadar Doyle (CnaG) |
| 9th | 1937 | Myles Keogh (FG) | Robert Briscoe (FF) | Thomas Lawlor (Lab) | Thomas Kelly (FF) | Joseph Hannigan (Ind.) | Seán Lemass (FF) | Peadar Doyle (FG) |
| 10th | 1938 | James Beckett (FG) | Robert Briscoe (FF) | James Lynch (FF) | Thomas Kelly (FF) | Joseph Hannigan (Ind.) | Seán Lemass (FF) | Peadar Doyle (FG) |
| 10th | 1939 by-election | John McCann (FF) | Robert Briscoe (FF) | James Lynch (FF) | Thomas Kelly (FF) | Joseph Hannigan (Ind.) | Seán Lemass (FF) | Peadar Doyle (FG) |
| 11th | 1943 | Maurice Dockrell (FG) | Robert Briscoe (FF) | James Lynch (FF) | James Larkin Jnr (Lab) | John McCann (FF) | Seán Lemass (FF) | Peadar Doyle (FG) |
| 12th | 1944 | Maurice Dockrell (FG) | Robert Briscoe (FF) | James Lynch (FF) | James Larkin Jnr (Lab) | John McCann (FF) | Seán Lemass (FF) | Peadar Doyle (FG) |
| 13th | 1948 | Constituency abolished. See Dublin South-Central, Dublin South-East and Dublin South-West. | | | | | | |

| Dáil | Election | Deputy (Party) | Deputy (Party) | Deputy (Party) | Deputy (Party) | Deputy (Party) |
|---|---|---|---|---|---|---|
| 22nd | 1981 | Niall Andrews (FF) | Séamus Brennan (FF) | Nuala Fennell (FG) | John Kelly (FG) | Alan Shatter (FG) |
| 23rd | 1982 (Feb) | Niall Andrews (FF) | Séamus Brennan (FF) | Nuala Fennell (FG) | John Kelly (FG) | Alan Shatter (FG) |
| 24th | 1982 (Nov) | Niall Andrews (FF) | Séamus Brennan (FF) | Nuala Fennell (FG) | John Kelly (FG) | Alan Shatter (FG) |
| 25th | 1987 | Tom Kitt (FF) | Séamus Brennan (FF) | Anne Colley (PDs) | John Kelly (FG) | Alan Shatter (FG) |
| 26th | 1989 | Tom Kitt (FF) | Séamus Brennan (FF) | Nuala Fennell (FG) | Roger Garland (GP) | Alan Shatter (FG) |
| 27th | 1992 | Tom Kitt (FF) | Séamus Brennan (FF) | Liz O'Donnell (PDs) | Eithne FitzGerald (Lab) | Alan Shatter (FG) |
| 28th | 1997 | Tom Kitt (FF) | Séamus Brennan (FF) | Liz O'Donnell (PDs) | Olivia Mitchell (FG) | Alan Shatter (FG) |
| 29th | 2002 | Tom Kitt (FF) | Séamus Brennan (FF) | Liz O'Donnell (PDs) | Olivia Mitchell (FG) | Eamon Ryan (GP) |
| 30th | 2007 | Tom Kitt (FF) | Séamus Brennan (FF) | Alan Shatter (FG) | Olivia Mitchell (FG) | Eamon Ryan (GP) |
| 30th | 2009 by-election | Tom Kitt (FF) | George Lee (FG) | Alan Shatter (FG) | Olivia Mitchell (FG) | Eamon Ryan (GP) |
| 31st | 2011 | Shane Ross (Ind.) | Peter Mathews (FG) | Alan Shatter (FG) | Olivia Mitchell (FG) | Alex White (Lab) |
| 32nd | 2016 | Constituency abolished. See Dublin Rathdown, Dublin South-West and Dún Laoghaire. | | | | |
