= Irish Human Rights and Equality Commission =

National human rights and equality authority for Ireland

- Irish: Coimisiún na hÉireann um Chearta an Duine agus Comhionannas
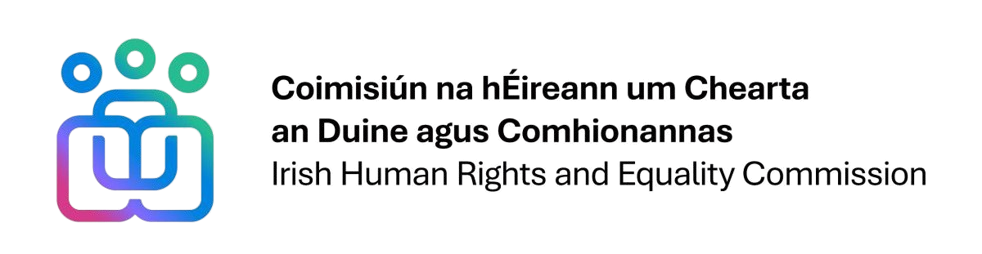

State agency overview
- Formed: 1 November 2014
- Jurisdiction: Republic of Ireland
- Headquarters: 16-22 Green Street; Dublin 7, Ireland
- Employees: 89
- Annual budget: €8.4 million (FY 22/23)
- State agency executive: Liam Herrick, Chief Commissioner
- Parent department: Department of Children, Disability and Equality
- Key document: Irish Human Rights and Equality Commission Act 2014
- Website: https://www.ihrec.ie/

The Irish Human Rights and Equality Commission (IHREC) the Republic of Ireland's national human rights institution (NHRI) and National Equality Body. It is a statutory body which is publicly funded but independent of government. The Chief Commissioner is Liam Herrick.

== Establishment ==
The IHREC was established by the Irish Human Rights and Equality Commission Act 2014 as the merger of two earlier bodies, which were dissolved and had their functions transferred to the IHREC:

- The Equality Authority — established in 1977 as the Employment Equality Agency, it was renamed by the Employment Equality Act 1998.
- The Irish Human Rights Commission (IHRC) — established in 2001 under the Human Rights Commission Act 2000.

The functions of the IHREC under the 2014 act are:

- To protect and promote human rights and equality,
- To encourage the development of a culture of respect for human rights, equality, and intercultural understanding in the State,
- To promote understanding and awareness of the importance of human rights and equality in the State,
- To encourage good practice in intercultural relations, to promote tolerance and acceptance of diversity in the State and respect for the freedom and dignity of each person, and
- To work towards the elimination of human rights abuses, discrimination and prohibited conduct.

Because IHREC is an NHRI, its powers and functions fully comply with the Paris Principles. The Principles, which set out the role, composition, status and functions of NHRIs, were endorsed by the United Nations General Assembly in December 1993.

== Organisation ==
List of Chief Commissioners
Term	Name
2014–2020	Emily Logan
2020–2024	Sinéad Gibney
2024–	Liam Herrick

The commission is composed of a Chief Commissioner and 14 members. The members of the commission are nominated by the Government of Ireland and appointed by the President.

Gibney resigned in February 2024 to seek the Social Democrats nomination for Dublin in the European Paraliament election. Liam Herrick was appointed as Chief Commissioner in November 2014.

The Director of the Irish Human Rights and Equality Commission is Deirdre Malone, the Director is also the Accounting Officer for the organisation.

== Work ==
IHREC's founding legislation provides a range of ways to address human rights and equality issues from engagement to enforcement. The commission aims to bring about change through legal means, policy and legislative advice, awareness and education and partnerships across civil society. IHREC operates a Your Rights Information Service which provides the public with information on rights and remedies available under equality and human rights law in Ireland.

== See also ==
- Human rights in Ireland
- Equality Commission for Northern Ireland
- Northern Ireland Human Rights Commission
