= Dublin Rathdown =

Dáil constituency (2016–present)

- Dáil constituency
- Location of Dublin Rathdown within County Dublin
- Interactive map of constituency boundaries since the 2024 general election
- Major settlements: Ballinteer; Churchtown; Clonskeagh; Dundrum; Stillorgan

Current constituency
- Created: 2016
- Seats: 3 (2016–2024); 4 (2024–)
- TDs: Shay Brennan (FF); Sinéad Gibney (SD); Maeve O'Connell (FG); Neale Richmond (FG)
- Local government area: Dún Laoghaire–Rathdown
- EP constituency: Dublin

Dublin Rathdown is a parliamentary constituency represented in Dáil Éireann, the lower house of the Irish parliament or Oireachtas, since the 2016 general election. The constituency elects four deputies (Teachtaí Dála, commonly known as TDs) on the system of proportional representation by means of the single transferable vote (PR-STV). It is in the western part of the county of Dún Laoghaire–Rathdown.

== History and boundaries ==
It was established by the Electoral (Amendment) (Dáil Constituencies) Act 2013 and first used at the 2016 election. It largely replaced the old constituency of Dublin South, with the electoral divisions in Dún Laoghaire–Rathdown of Cabinteely-Loughlinstown, Foxrock-Carrickmines, Foxrock-Torquay and Stillorgan-Leopardstown being transferred to the Dún Laoghaire constituency; and the electoral divisions in South Dublin of Ballyboden, Edmondstown, Firhouse-Ballycullen, Firhouse-Knocklyon, Rathfarnham-Ballyroan, Rathfarnham-Butterfield, Rathfarnham-Hermitage, Rathfarnham-St. Enda's, Rathfarnham Village being transferred to Dublin South-West. There was a minor boundary revision at the 2020 general election.

Changes to the Dublin Rathdown constituency
Years	TDs	Boundaries
2016–2020	3	In the county of Dún Laoghaire-Rathdown the electoral divisions of: Ballinteer-Broadford, Ballinteer-Ludford, Ballinteer-Marley, Ballinteer-Meadowbroads, Ballinteer-Meadowmount, Ballinteer-Woodpark, Churchtown-Castle, Churchtown-Landscape, Churchtown-Nutgrove, Churchtown-Orwell, Churchtown-Woodlawn, Clonskeagh-Belfield, Clonskeagh-Farranboley, Clonskeagh-Milltown, Clonskeagh-Roebuck, Clonskeagh-Windy Arbour, Dundrum-Balally, Dundrum-Kilmacud, Dundrum-Sandyford, Dundrum-Sweetmount, Dundrum-Taney, Glencullen, Stillorgan-Deerpark, Stillorgan-Kilmacud, Stillorgan-Merville, Stillorgan-Mount Merrion, Tibradden.
2020–	3	In the county of Dún Laoghaire–Rathdown the electoral divisions of: Ballinteer-Broadford, Ballinteer-Ludford, Ballinteer-Marley, Ballinteer-Meadowbroads, Ballinteer-Meadowmount, Ballinteer-Woodpark, Churchtown-Castle, Churchtown-Landscape, Churchtown-Nutgrove, Churchtown-Orwell, Churchtown-Woodlawn, Clonskeagh-Belfield, Clonskeagh-Farranboley, Clonskeagh-Milltown, Clonskeagh-Roebuck, Clonskeagh-Windy Arbour, Dundrum-Balally, Dundrum-Kilmacud, Dundrum-Sandyford, Dundrum-Sweetmount, Dundrum-Taney, Stillorgan-Deerpark, Stillorgan-Kilmacud, Stillorgan-Merville, Stillorgan-Mount Merrion, Tibradden; and the electoral division of Glencullen except for that part that is in the constituency of Dún Laoghaire [that part that lies to the east of the M50 Motorway and to the south of the N31 and the Leopardstown Road].

The Constituency Review Report 2023 of the Electoral Commission recommended that at the next general election Dublin Rathdown be increased to a four-seat constituency with the transfer of territory from Dún Laoghaire.

The Electoral (Amendment) Act 2023 defines the constituency as:

"In the county of Dún Laoghaire–Rathdown, the electoral divisions of:

Ballinteer-Broadford, Ballinteer-Ludford, Ballinteer-Marley, Ballinteer-Meadowbroads, Ballinteer-Meadowmount, Ballinteer-Woodpark, Churchtown-Castle, Churchtown-Landscape, Churchtown-Nutgrove, Churchtown-Orwell, Churchtown-Woodlawn, Clonskeagh-Belfield, Clonskeagh-Farranboley, Clonskeagh-Milltown, Clonskeagh-Roebuck, Clonskeagh-Windy Arbour, Dundrum-Balally, Dundrum-Kilmacud, Dundrum-Sandyford, Dundrum-Sweetmount, Dundrum-Taney, Foxrock-Carrickmines, Foxrock-Torquay, Glencullen, Stillorgan-Deerpark, Stillorgan-Kilmacud, Stillorgan-Leopardstown, Stillorgan-Merville, Stillorgan-Mount Merrion, Tibradden."

== TDs ==
Teachtaí Dála (TDs) for Dublin Rathdown 2016–
Key to parties: FF = Fianna Fáil; FG = Fine Gael; GP = Green; Ind = Independent; SD = Social Democrats
Dáil	Election	Deputy (Party)	Deputy (Party)	Deputy (Party)	Deputy (Party)
32nd	2016	Catherine Martin (GP)	Shane Ross (Ind)	Josepha Madigan (FG)	3 seats 2016–2024
33rd	2020	Catherine Martin (GP)	Neale Richmond (FG)	Josepha Madigan (FG)	3 seats 2016–2024
34th	2024	Sinéad Gibney (SD)	Neale Richmond (FG)	Maeve O'Connell (FG)	Shay Brennan (FF)

Note: The columns in this table are used only for presentational purposes, and no significance should be attached to the order of columns. For details of the order in which seats were won at each election, see the detailed results of that election.

== Elections ==
*: Outgoing TD

=== 2024 general election ===
2024 general election: Dublin Rathdown
Party	Candidate	FPv%	Count									
Party	Candidate	FPv%	1	2	3	4	5	6	7	8	9	10
Fine Gael	Neale Richmond	20.6	10,044									
Fine Gael	Maeve O'Connell	13.1	6,375	6,573	6,599	6,620	6,858	7,440	7,615	8,123	8,218	9,752
Fianna Fáil	Shay Brennan	12.1	5,913	5,943	5,978	5,993	6,823	7,199	7,601	7,908	8,096	8,999
Independent	Michael Fleming	9.0	4,380	4,394	4,582	4,646	4,742	5,035	5,861	6,291	7,486	8,002
Social Democrats	Sinéad Gibney	8.8	4,277	4,281	4,296	4,939	4,989	5,080	5,214	6,244	8,125	10,612
Green	Catherine Martin	8.5	4,146	4,161	4,175	4,262	4,330	4,472	4,560	5,480	5,881	
Sinn Féin	Shaun Tracey	7.3	3,551	3,552	3,590	3,896	3,913	3,976	4,223	4,382		
Labour	Lettie McCarthy	6.2	3,043	3,054	3,068	3,182	3,250	3,382	3,478			
Aontú	Liam Coughlan	3.7	1,808	1,809	2,041	2,075	2,097	2,267				
Independent	Alan Shatter	3.7	1,783	1,793	1,852	1,893	1,925					
Fianna Fáil	Elaine Dunne	2.9	1,417	1,425	1,439	1,443						
PBP–Solidarity	Síomha Ní Aonghusa (Note: Ní Aonghusa is a member of People Before Profit.)	2.7	1,336	1,336	1,351							
National Party	Garrett McCafferty	0.8	367	367								
Independent	Kevin Daly	0.5	253	253								
Independent	Conor Murphy	0.1	66	66								
Electorate: 80,852 Valid: 48,759 Spoilt: 241 Quota: 9,752 Turnout: 49,000 (60.6%)

=== 2020 general election ===
2020 general election: Dublin Rathdown
Party	Candidate	FPv%	Count							
Party	Candidate	FPv%	1	2	3	4	5	6	7	8
Green	Catherine Martin	21.1	8,958	9,171	9,431	9,949	11,444			
Fine Gael	Neale Richmond	15.9	6,743	6,789	6,887	6,926	7,461	8,675	8,950	9,704
Fine Gael	Josepha Madigan	15.3	6,482	6,555	6,603	6,624	6,964	7,835	8,065	8,677
Sinn Féin	Sorcha Nic Cormaic	11.6	4,926	4,980	5,082	5,716	5,991	6,538	6,726	
Fianna Fáil	Shay Brennan	10.7	4,549	5,118	5,532	5,599	5,913	6,904	7,054	8,277
Independent	Shane Ross	8.1	3,419	3,474	3,651	3,780	4,215			
Labour	Lettie McCarthy	7.5	3,179	3,242	3,328	3,519				
Solidarity–PBP	Eoghan Ó Ceannabháin (Note: Ó Ceannabháin was a member of People Before Profit.)	3.5	1,498	1,597	1,680					
Aontú	Liam Coughlan	3.3	1,413	1,450						
Fianna Fáil	Deirdre Conroy	2.1	886							
Independent	Patrick Noonan	0.8	350							
Electorate: 67,012 Valid: 42,403 Spoilt: 251 (0.6%) Quota: 10,601 Turnout: 42,654 (63.7%)

=== 2016 general election ===
2016 general election: Dublin Rathdown
Party	Candidate	FPv%	Count					
Party	Candidate	FPv%	1	2	3	4	5	6
Independent	Shane Ross	24.8	10,202	10,411				
Fine Gael	Josepha Madigan	16.2	6,668	6,835	7,180	7,290	8,579	9,488
Fine Gael	Alan Shatter	14.4	5,905	5,979	6,195	6,268	7,745	8,444
Fianna Fáil	Mary White	10.3	4,220	4,325	4,761	5,165	5,463	
Green	Catherine Martin	10.0	4,122	4,314	4,812	6,105	7,255	9,421
Labour	Alex White	9.8	4,048	4,080	4,258	4,436		
Sinn Féin	Sorcha Nic Cormaic	7.0	2,858	2,896	3,076			
Independent	Peter Mathews	4.9	2,021	2,241				
Renua	Alan Daveron	2.6	1,055					
Electorate: 62,340 Valid: 41,099 Spoilt: 226 (0.5%) Quota: 10,275 Turnout: 41,325 (66.3%)

== See also ==
- Elections in the Republic of Ireland
- Politics of the Republic of Ireland
- List of Dáil by-elections
- List of political parties in the Republic of Ireland
