= Front bench (Ireland) =

A front bench (Irish: binse tosaigh) in Dáil Éireann, the lower house of the Oireachtas of Ireland, refers to any organised group of party members who holds any degree of speaking power (derived from the party) on specific issues. This includes government ministers and party spokespersons. The Teachtaí Dála (TDs) who are members of the Government of Ireland constitutes the "government front bench", while members of parties in declared opposition to the government constitute the "opposition front bench". By comparison, members of a governing or opposition party, who are not ministers or spokespersons, are typically said to the represent the "back benches".

Third parties (those who may not be in government or opposition) may only have power to speak or be recognised by the Ceann Comhairle if such parties number at least five TDs. In order to attain the right to speak in session, parties and independents with fewer members can ally themselves into coalitions known as technical groups.

Despite the frequent necessity for coalitions in front benches, each party retains its front bench spokespersons analogous (but not exclusively analogous) to government departments.

== List of front benches ==
- Government of the 33rd Dáil
  - Fine Gael Front Bench
  - Fianna Fáil Front Bench
  - Green Party Front Bench
- Opposition Front Bench
  - Sinn Féin Front Bench
  - Labour Party Front Bench
  - Technical group

== See also ==
- Frontbench Team
