= Green Party Front Bench (Ireland) =

Irish political party

The Green Party is a political party in the Oireachtas.

The party was previously the fourth-largest political party in the 33rd Dáil and formed part of the Government of the 33rd Dáil. The party faced a series of electoral defeats at the 2022 Northern Ireland Assembly election, 2024 European elections, 2024 local elections and the 2024 general election. As of February 2025, It has one TD (Roderic O'Gorman), one Senator (Malcolm Noonan) and 23 councillors.

== Current frontbench ==
=== 2025–present ===
Portfolio	Spokesperson	Constituency
Party leader	Roderic O'Gorman TD	Dublin West
Deputy leader Public Expenditure, Infrastructure, Public Service Reform, Digitalisation & Media	Cllr Hazel Chu	Dublin Bay South
Northern Ireland & Shared Island	Mal O'Hara	Green Party Northern Ireland
Chairperson; Foreign Affairs, Trade and Defence	Cllr Janet Horner	Dublin Central
European Affairs	Ciarán Cuffe	Dublin Central
Finance	Cllr Michael Pidgeon	Dublin South-Central
Enterprise, Tourism and Employment	Mark Lynch	Dublin South-West
Health	Cllr Carolyn Moore	Dublin Bay South
Arts and Culture	Cllr Donna Cooney	Dublin Bay North
Sport and Youth	Cllr Honore Kamegni	Cork South-Central
Climate, Communications and Energy	Ossian Smyth	Dún Laoghaire
Environment	Cllr Seán Hartigan	Limerick City
Transport	Cllr Feljin Jose	Dublin Central
Housing	Cllr Oliver Moran	Cork North-Central
Local Government and Planning	Cllr Erika Doyle	Wicklow
Agriculture, Food and the Marine	Senator Malcolm Noonan	Carlow–Kilkenny
Education	Cllr Conor Dowling	Dún Laoghaire
Further and Higher Education, Research, Innovation and Science	Cllr Eva Dowling	Dún Laoghaire
Children and Equality	Cllr Oisín O'Connor	Dublin Rathdown
Disability	Cllr Maria Dollard	Carlow–Kilkenny
Justice, Home Affairs and Migration	Cllr Lourda Scott	Wicklow
Balanced Regional Development	Niall Murphy	Galway West
Social Protection	Cllr Lauren Tuite	Dún Laoghaire
Community Development	Caroline Conroy	Dublin North West
Rural Affairs, the Gaeltacht and Gaeilge	Peadar Ó Fionnáin	Kerry

== Previous frontbenches ==
=== 2020–2024 ===
Portfolio	Spokesperson	Constituency
Party leader Environment, Climate and Communications & Transport	Minister Eamon Ryan TD	Dublin Bay South
Deputy leader Tourism, Culture, Arts, Gaeltacht, Sport and Media	Minister Catherine Martin TD	Dublin Rathdown
Children, Equality, Disability, Integration and Youth	Minister Roderic O'Gorman TD	Dublin West
Land Use and Biodiversity	Minister of State, Senator Pippa Hackett	Laois–Offaly
Public Procurement and eGovernment	Minister of State Ossian Smyth TD	Dún Laoghaire
Community Development and Charities	Minister of State Joe O'Brien TD	Dublin Fingal
Heritage and Electoral Reform	Minister of State Malcolm Noonan TD	Carlow–Kilkenny
Social Protection	Marc Ó Cathasaigh TD	Waterford
Finance, Public Expenditure and Health	Neasa Hourigan TD	Dublin Central
Transport, Climate Action and Environment	Brian Leddin TD	Limerick City
Justice	Patrick Costello TD	Dublin South-Central
Planning and Local Government	Steven Matthews TD	Wicklow
Housing	Francis Noel Duffy TD	Dublin South-West
Marine	Grace O'Sullivan MEP	Ireland South
Irish Language	Rob O'Donnell	Tipperary
Education & Higher Education	Senator Pauline O'Reilly	Galway West
Foreign Affairs & Defence with responsibility for Brexit	Senator Vincent P. Martin	Kildare North
Rural Development & Enterprise, Trade and Employment	Senator Róisín Garvey	Clare

=== 2019–2020 ===
Portfolio	Spokesperson
Party leader Communications	Eamon Ryan TD
Deputy leader Education and Skills	Catherine Martin TD
Environmental Protection, Natural Resources, Marine and Tourism	Grace O'Sullivan MEP
Agriculture, Heritage, Food and Animal Welfare	Senator Pippa Hackett
Constitutional Reform	Cllr. Oliver Moran
Irish Language	Cllr. Peter Kavanagh
Justice	Roderic O'Gorman TD
Finance	Neasa Hourigan TD
Transport	Patrick Costello TD
Children and Youth Affairs	Cllr. Pauline O'Reily
Social Protection	Marc Ó Cathasaigh TD
Digital	Ossain Smyth TD
Local Government	Malcolm Noonan TD
Water	Steven Matthews TD
Foreign Affairs	Cllr. Vincent P. Martin
Health	Dr. Séamus McMenamin
Climate	Cllr. David Healy
Heritage, Culture and the Arts	Cllr. Claire Byrne
Enterprise	Cllr. Hazel Chu
Rural Development	Cllr. Roisin Garvey
Equality and Disability	Cllr. Una Power
Housing	Cllr. Deidre Ni Fhloinn
Energy	Brian Leddin TD

== 2016–2019 ==
Portfolio	Spokesperson
Party leader	Eamon Ryan TD
Deputy leader Education and Skills	Catherine Martin TD
Finance	Cllr. Mark Dearey
Justice	Cllr. Roderic O'Gorman
Transport	Cllr. Ciarán Cuffe
Housing and Planning	Cllr. Francis Duffy
Environment; Local Government	Cllr. Malcolm Noonan
Energy	Gearóid Fitzgibbon
Welfare	Lorna Bogue

=== 2012–2016 ===
Portfolio	Spokesperson
Party leader	Eamon Ryan
Deputy leader Education and Skills	Catherine Martin
Public Expenditure and Reform	Ciarán Cuffe
Social Protection	Roderic O'Gorman
Justice, Equality and Defence	Joan Campbell
Transport, Tourism and Sport	Adam Douglas
Jobs, Enterprise and Innovation	Marianne Butler
Health	Oisín Ó hAlmhain
European Affairs	Brian Meaney
Foreign Affairs and Trade	Niamh Fitzgibbon
Housing and Planning	Tom Kivlehan
Environment, Community and Local Government	Malcolm Noonan
Communications, Energy and Natural Resources	Ossian Smith
Children and Youth Affairs	Patrick Costello
Arts, Heritage and the Gaeltacht	Rian Coulter
Forestry	Cathy Fitzgerald
Agriculture, Food and Marine	Seamus Sheridan
Finance	Mark Dearey
Welfare	Lorna Bogue

=== 2007–2011 ===
Portfolio	Spokesperson
Party leader	John Gormley
Deputy leader	Mary White
Education	Paul Gogarty
Transport; Enterprise, Trade and Employment; Communications, Marine and Natural Resources	Eamon Ryan

=== 2002–2007 ===
Portfolio	Spokesperson
Party Leader	Trevor Sargent
Finance; Social and Family Affairs; Community, Rural Development and the Islands	Dan Boyle
Foreign Affairs; Defence; Health and Children; Party Chairman	John Gormley
Environment	Ciarán Cuffe (until 2003)

== See also ==
- Fianna Fáil Front Bench
- Fine Gael Front Bench
- Labour Party Front Bench
- Sinn Féin Front Bench
