= Fianna Fáil Front Bench =

Opposition Front Bench of Ireland, 2011–2020

Martin Front Bench
- Opposition front bench of Ireland
- 12 April 2011 – 27 June 2020
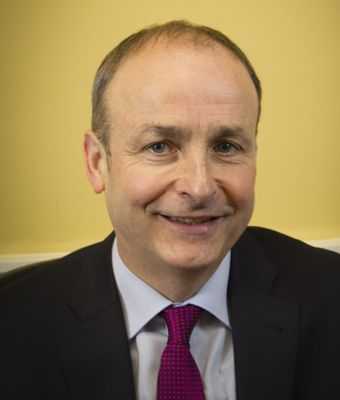
- Martin in 2016
- Date formed: 12 April 2011
- Date dissolved: 27 June 2020

People and organisations
- President: Mary McAleese; Michael D. Higgins
- Leader of the Opposition: Micheál Martin
- Member party: Fianna Fáil
- Status in legislature: 20 / 166 (12%) (2011) 45 / 158 (28%) (2016)

History
- Legislature terms: 31st Dáil; 32nd Dáil
- Predecessor: Third Kenny Front Bench
- Successor: Second McDonald Front Bench

Micheál Martin served as the Leader of the Opposition and Leader of Fianna Fáil from 12 April 2011 until 27 June 2020. During this period, Fianna Fáil formed the largest opposition party in Dáil Éireann across the 31st Dáil and 32nd Dáil.

== Overview ==
Fianna Fáil is the largest opposition party in the Dáil and therefore that party's leader takes the title Leader of the Opposition, a largely nominal role. The other parties that occupy the opposition benches include Sinn Féin and the United Left Alliance.

The "Official Opposition" is viewed as the party tasked with keeping the government in check. It is also generally viewed as the alternative government. The Official Opposition maintains a Front bench of TDs that often have the same portfolios as actual ministers. They are known as opposition "spokespersons".

The title of "the Opposition" is held by the largest party in Dáil Éireann which is not in government, and sometimes the Opposition may even be the largest party in the Dáil. The latter situation almost always occurred when Fianna Fáil were in opposition. This is due to the existence of the multi-party system where Fine Gael usually forms a coalition with the Labour Party.

Official Opposition	Years
Labour Party	1922–1927
Fianna Fáil	1927–1932
Cumann na nGaedheal	1932–1933
Fine Gael	1933–1948
Fianna Fáil	1948–1951
Fine Gael	1951–1954
Fianna Fáil	1954–1957
Fine Gael	1957–1973
Fianna Fáil	1973–1977
Fine Gael	1977–1981
Fianna Fáil	1981–1982
Fine Gael	1982
Fianna Fáil	1982–1987
Fine Gael	1987–1994
Fianna Fáil	1994–1997
Fine Gael	1997–2011
Fianna Fáil	2011–2020
Sinn Féin	2020–

== Fianna Fáil Front Bench 2016–2020 ==
=== Dáil Éireann ===
Portfolio	Name
Leader of Fianna Fáil; Leader of the Opposition	Micheál Martin
Deputy Leader of Fianna Fáil; Minister for Rural and Community Development and the Gaeltacht; Director of Policy Development	Dara Calleary
Opposition Chief Whip	Michael Moynihan
Agriculture, Food and the Marine	Charlie McConalogue
Culture, Heritage and the Gaeltacht	Niamh Smyth
Children and Youth Affairs	Anne Rabbitte
Communications, Climate Action and Environment	Jack Chambers
Defence	Jack Chambers
Disability	Margaret Murphy O'Mahony
Dublin	John Lahart
Education and Skills	Thomas Byrne
Housing, Planning and Local Government	Darragh O'Brien
Finance	Michael McGrath
Foreign Affairs and Trade	Seán Haughey
Health	Stephen Donnelly
Business, Enterprise and Innovation	Robert Troy
Justice and Equality	Jim O'Callaghan
Mental Health	James Browne
Public Expenditure and Reform	Barry Cowen
Employment Affairs and Social Protection	Willie O'Dea
Transport, Tourism and Sport	Marc MacSharry
Brexit	Lisa Chambers

=== Seanad Éireann ===
Portfolio	Name
Seanad Group Leader; Employment Affairs and Social Protection	Catherine Ardagh
Seanad Deputy Group Leader; Foreign Affairs, Irish Overseas and the Diaspora	Mark Daly
Agriculture, Food and the Marine	Paul Daly
Business, Enterprise and Innovation	Aidan Davitt
Rural and Community Development	Brian Ó Domhnaill
Education	Robbie Gallagher
Finance	Gerry Horkan
Justice, Children and Youth Affairs	Lorraine Clifford-Lee
Communications, Climate Action and Environment	Terry Leyden
Housing, Planning and Local Government	Jennifer Murnane O'Connor
Without portfolio	Denis O'Donovan
Health and Mental Health	Ned O'Sullivan
Transport, Tourism and Sport	Keith Swanick
Public Expenditure and Reform and Defence	Ned O'Sullivan

== Fianna Fáil Front Bench 2012–2016 ==
Portfolio	Spokesperson
Leader of the Opposition, Spokesperson on Northern Ireland	Micheál Martin
Agriculture and Food, and Community Affairs	Éamon Ó Cuív
Children	Robert Troy
Communications, Energy and Natural Resources	Michael Moynihan
Constitutional reform, Arts and Culture, Defence and Party whip	Seán Ó Fearghaíl
Education and Skills	Charlie McConalogue
Environment and Local Government	Barry Cowen
Finance	Michael McGrath
Foreign Affairs and Trade and Border Region Development	Brendan Smith
Health	Billy Kelleher
Horticulture and Rural Affairs	Séamus Kirk
Housing, Planning and Gaeltacht Affairs	Michael Kitt
Jobs, Enterprise and Innovation	Dara Calleary
Justice and Equality	Niall Collins
Marine and Fisheries	John Browne
Public Expenditure and Reform	Seán Fleming
Small Business and Regulatory Framework	John McGuinness
Social Protection and Social Equality	Willie O'Dea
Transport, Tourism and Sport	Timmy Dooley
Mental Health and Special Needs	Colm Keaveney

== See also ==
- Fine Gael Front Bench
- Green Party Front Bench
- Labour Party Front Bench
- Sinn Féin Front Bench
