= Sinn Féin Front Bench =

Sinn Féin Front Bench since 2020

McDonald Front Bench
- Opposition front bench of Ireland
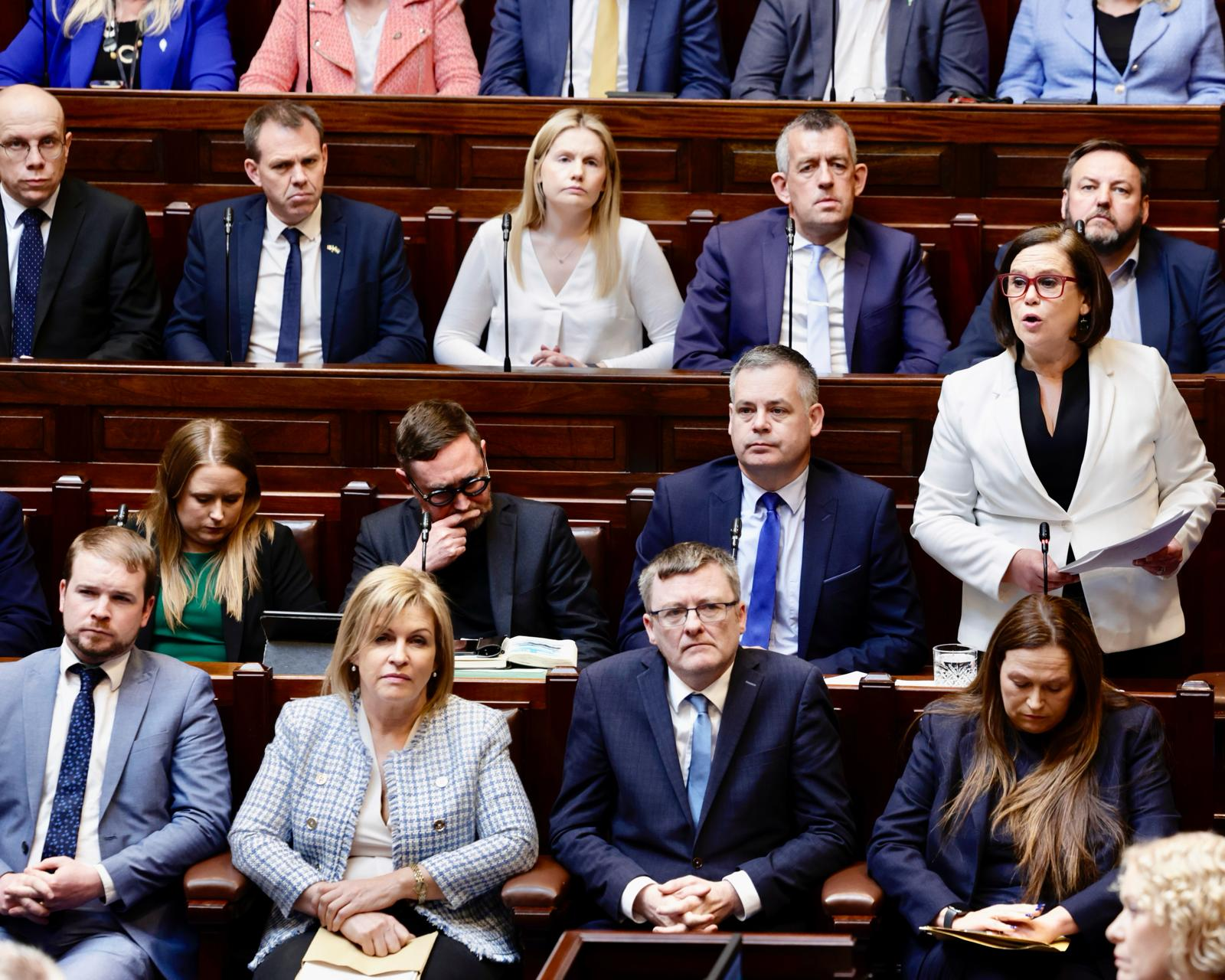
- McDonald with members of her front bench during the nomination of the Taoiseach in April 2024
- Date formed: 10 February 2018

People and organisations
- Leader of the Opposition: Mary Lou McDonald
- Member party: Sinn Féin
- Status in legislature: 39 / 174 (22%) (2024) 37 / 160 (23%) (2020) 23 / 158 (15%) (2018)

History
- Legislature terms: 34th Dáil; 33rd Dáil; 32nd Dáil
- Predecessor: Second Martin Front Bench

Mary Lou McDonald has served as the Leader of the Opposition since 27 June 2020, following the formation of the government of the 33rd Dáil after the 2020 general election. McDonald has continued in this role following the formation of the government of the 34th Dáil.

== Sinn Féin Front Bench ==
Following Micheál Martin's appointment as Taoiseach on 23 January 2025, Mary Lou McDonald retained her position as the second President of Sinn Féin and first woman to hold the de facto role of Leader of the Opposition, a position she has held since the 2020 general election.

On 28 January 2025, Mary Lou McDonald announced the new Sinn Féin front bench for the 34th Dáil.

=== Front Bench spokespersons ===
Portfolio	Name	Elected office
Leader of the Opposition; President of Sinn Féin	Mary Lou McDonald	TD for Dublin Central
Deputy leader of Sinn Féin in the Dáil; Spokesperson on Finance	Pearse Doherty	TD for Donegal
Spokesperson on Public Expenditure, Infrastructure, Public Service Reform and Digitalisation	Mairéad Farrell	TD for Galway West
Spokesperson on Foreign Affairs and Trade and Defence	Donnchadh Ó Laoghaire	TD for Cork South-Central
Spokesperson on Environment and Climate Action	Pa Daly	TD for Kerry
Spokesperson on Education and Youth	Darren O'Rourke	TD for Meath East
Spokesperson on Children, Disability and Equality	Claire Kerrane	TD for Roscommon–Galway
Spokesperson on Enterprise and Tourism	Rose Conway-Walsh	TD for Mayo
Spokesperson on Social Protection and Rural and Community Development	Louise O'Reilly	TD for Dublin Fingal West
Spokesperson on Arts, Media, Communications, Culture and Sport	Joanna Byrne	TD for Louth
Spokesperson on Health	David Cullinane	TD for Waterford
Spokesperson on Housing, Local Government and Heritage	Eoin Ó Broin	TD for Dublin Mid-West
Spokesperson on Justice, Home Affairs and Migration	Matt Carthy	TD for Cavan–Monaghan
Spokesperson on Agriculture, Food and the Marine	Martin Kenny	TD for Sligo–Leitrim
Spokesperson on Further and Higher Education, Research, Innovation and Science	Donna McGettigan	TD for Clare
Spokesperson on Gaeilge and the Gaeltacht	Aengus Ó Snodaigh	TD for Dublin South-Central

=== Chief Whip ===
Portfolio	Name	Elected office
Chief Whip and spokesperson for Fisheries and the Marine	Pádraig Mac Lochlainn (In attendance at front bench meetings)	TD for Donegal
Deputy Whip	Denise Mitchell	TD for Dublin Bay North

== Junior spokespersons ==
On 18 February 2025, Mary Lou McDonald announced a new team of junior spokespeople that broadly correspond with the portfolios of Ministers of State.

Portfolio	Name	Elected office
Junior spokesperson for Mental Health	Sorca Clarke	TD for Longford–Westmeath
Junior spokesperson for Disability	Ruairí Ó Murchú	TD for Louth
Junior spokesperson for Older people and Carers	Natasha Newsome Drennan	TD for Carlow–Kilkenny
Junior spokesperson for National Drug and Alcohol Strategy, Addiction, Recovery and Wellbeing	Ann Graves	TD for Dublin Fingal East
Junior spokesperson for Rural Affairs, Community Development and the Gaeltacht	Conor D. McGuinness	TD for Waterford
Junior spokesperson for Tourism and Diaspora	Cathy Bennett	TD for Cavan–Monaghan
Junior spokesperson for Transport; Junior spokesperson for Energy	Louis O'Hara	TD for Galway East
Junior spokesperson for Special Education	Shónagh Ní Raghallaigh	TD for Kildare South
Junior spokesperson for Social Enterprise, Circular Economy, Nighttime Economy and Small Businesses	Paul Donnelly	TD for Dublin West
Junior spokesperson for Community Arts; Junior spokesperson for Infrastructure; Junior spokesperson for Climate Action and Biodiversity	Réada Cronin	TD for Kildare North
Junior spokesperson for Urban Regeneration and Renewal, Planning, Public Realm and Local Government	Thomas Gould	TD for Cork North-Central
Junior spokesperson for European Affairs; Junior spokesperson for Defence and Neutrality	Seán Crowe	TD for Dublin South-West
Junior spokesperson for Community Safety; Junior spokesperson for Youth; Spokesperson for Dublin	Mark Ward	TD for Dublin Mid-West
Junior spokesperson for Worker's Rights	Johnny Guirke	TD for Meath West
Junior spokesperson for Equality, Domestic and Gender Based Violence	Máire Devine	TD for Dublin South-Central

== See also ==
- Government of the 34th Dáil
- Labour Party Front Bench (Ireland)
- Social Democrats Front Bench (Ireland)
