= Party spokesperson =

Member of a political party charged with communicating the party's position

Party Spokesperson of Political Party
- Type: Communication role
- Appointer: Party Leadership
- Term length: Varies by party
- Formation: Early 20th century

A Party spokesperson (also known as Party spokesman or Party spokeswoman) is any member of a political party (at any regional level of the party structure) who is charged by the leaders of the party with communicating the party's position on specific portfolios. Party spokespersons largely feature in political parties of parliamentary systems. Party spokespersons can also be assisted in their duties by deputy or assistant spokespersons in the same portfolio.

In Canada, non-government party spokespersons are known as party critics and deputy party critics, respectively. These representatives serve as the primary voice of their political organization on various issues, from policy matters to crisis management situations.

== Role and Responsibilities ==
Party spokespersons handle multiple communication functions within their organizations. They prepare and deliver statements to journalists, participate in television and radio interviews, and respond to breaking news events that affect their party's interests. When controversial situations arise, these individuals often serve as the first line of defense, providing carefully crafted responses that align with party leadership's strategic objectives.

The role requires deep knowledge of party policy across numerous subject areas, as spokespersons may be called upon to address questions ranging from economic policy to foreign affairs within the same news cycle. They work closely with party leadership, policy advisors, and communications teams to ensure consistent messaging across all public platforms.

== Selection and Qualifications ==
Political parties typically select spokespersons based on their communication skills, policy expertise, and ability to remain composed under pressure. Many come from backgrounds in journalism, law, public relations, or have previous experience as elected officials. The position often serves as a stepping stone to higher-profile roles within the party or as preparation for running for elected office.

Some parties designate different spokespersons for specific policy areas, such as healthcare, defense, or economic affairs, allowing for more specialized expertise. Others prefer a smaller number of general spokespersons who can address the full range of political issues.

== Media Relations ==
The relationship between party spokespersons and journalists forms a crucial component of modern political communication. Spokespersons must balance their party's messaging goals with journalists' need for newsworthy information and quotes. This dynamic often involves strategic timing of announcements, selective availability for interviews, and careful navigation of hostile questioning.

Television appearances require additional skills beyond policy knowledge, including the ability to deliver concise, memorable soundbites and maintain visual composure. Radio interviews demand clear verbal communication without visual aids, while print media interactions allow for more detailed policy discussions.

== Historical Development ==
The formalization of party spokesperson roles grew alongside the expansion of mass media throughout the 20th century. As newspapers, radio, and television became primary sources of political information for citizens, parties recognized the need for dedicated professionals to manage these relationships rather than relying solely on elected officials who had other responsibilities.

== Challenges and Criticism ==
Party spokespersons face inherent tensions in their work. They must appear credible and trustworthy to maintain media relationships while advocating for positions that may be politically motivated rather than objectively accurate. Critics argue that the role contributes to the polarization of political discourse by prioritizing party loyalty over honest public debate.

The position also carries personal risks, as spokespersons may become targets of criticism when defending unpopular policies or responding to party scandals.

== International Variations ==
Different political systems handle party communication in various ways. In parliamentary systems, shadow ministers often serve spokesperson functions for opposition parties, combining policy expertise with media duties. Presidential systems may place greater emphasis on dedicated communications professionals who are not expected to hold elected office.

Some countries have formal regulations governing party spokesperson activities, particularly regarding campaign periods and public funding disclosure. Others rely on informal media ethics and party self-regulation to guide these relationships.

=== Impact on Democratic Process ===
Party spokespersons play a significant role in shaping public understanding of political issues and party positions. Their effectiveness can influence electoral outcomes by determining how successfully parties communicate their messages to voters through media coverage.

The quality of spokesperson performance can affect not only individual party fortunes but also the overall health of democratic discourse. Skilled practitioners who engage substantively with policy details contribute to informed public debate, while those who rely heavily on talking points and evasion may diminish the quality of political discussion.

== Parliamentary party spokespersons ==
Spokespersons of a ruling party are coterminous with their roles as ministers in the government cabinet, and spokespersons of the leading opposition party (usually in Westminster system parliaments, where they are called the "Official Opposition") are coterminous with their roles as shadow ministers in the shadow cabinet; both are usually called "frontbenchers". A minor parliamentary/legislative party (be it in or out of coalition with a government cabinet or official opposition shadow cabinet) may have its own set of spokespersons and respective portfolios, although they are often considered during parliamentary debates with lesser courtesy than the government or official opposition's cabinets; in Ireland, for example, all parliamentary parties with at least 7 elected members have their own front benches, while those with less than 7 elected members must agree with other independent MPs to form a technical group in order to gain speaking rights.

=== Non-parliamentary party spokespersons ===
Non-parliamentary parties or parties with very few elected parliament members (that is, not enough to effectively spread policy communication duties) may also have their own non-parliamentary spokespersons and respective portfolios, despite not possessing speaking rights in parliament (or sometimes, as in extra-parliamentary opposition, abstaining from seeking office). They are more likely to speak for the party to media outlets or other organizations.
