= Opposition Front Bench (Ireland) =

The Opposition Front Bench in Ireland are the front (and most visible) benches of the parties outside the Government.

Since the 2024 general election, the following parties occupy the front benches on the opposition side:

- Sinn Féin Front Bench
- Labour Party Front Bench
- Social Democrats Front Bench

== See also ==
- Front bench (Ireland)
- Technical group
