= 2019 Dún Laoghaire–Rathdown County Council election =

Part of the 2019 Irish local elections

← 2014	24 May 2019	2024 →

All 40 seats on Dún Laoghaire–Rathdown County Council 21 seats needed for a majority
	First party	Second party	Third party
Party	Fine Gael	Fianna Fáil	Green
Seats won	13	7	6
Seat change	▲2	▼1	▲4
	Fourth party	Fifth party	Sixth party
Party	Labour	People Before Profit	Social Democrats
Seats won	6	2	1
Seat change	▼1	▼1	▲1
	Seventh party
Party	Independent
Seats won	5
Seat change	▼1
- Results by Local Electoral Area
Council control after election
TBD

An election to all 40 seats on Dún Laoghaire–Rathdown County Council was held on 24 May 2019 as part of the 2019 Irish local elections. Dún Laoghaire–Rathdown was divided into six local electoral areas (LEAs) to elect councillors for a five-year term of office on the electoral system of proportional representation by means of the single transferable vote (PR-STV).

== Boundary changes ==
Following a recommendation of the 2018 Boundary Committee, the boundaries of the LEAs were altered from those used at the 2014 election. Its terms of reference required no change in the total number of councillors but set a lower maximum LEA size of seven councillors, requiring a change to the eight-seat Dún Laoghaire LEA. Other changes were necessitated by population shifts revealed by the 2016 census.

== Overview ==
After the 2019 election, Dún Laoghaire–Rathdown became Ireland's first 50:50 gender-neutral Council. Fine Gael remained the largest party gaining an additional 2 seats while seeing a slight reduction in vote-share. Fianna Fáil lost a seat in Stillorgan to return 7 in total and saw a slight reduction in vote share. The main winners in Dún Laoghaire were the Greens who won 6 seats and saw all 6 of their candidates elected in the process. They topped the poll in 4 of the 6 LEAs. Labour gained a seat in Dun Laoghaire but lost seats in Stillorgan and Glencullen–Sandyford to reduce their numbers to 6 seats overall. Solidarity–People Before Profit lost a seat in Dún Laoghaire to only return with 2 seats while Sinn Féin had a terrible election losing all 3 of their seats.

== Results by party ==
Party	Seats	±	1st pref	FPv%	±%
Fine Gael	13	▲2	21,156	27.30	▼0.85
Fianna Fáil	7	▼1	13,634	17.59	▼1.07
Green	6	▲4	15,234	19.66	▲12.69
Labour	6	▼1	9,132	11.78	▼1.36
People Before Profit	2	▼1	5,108	6.59	▼1.31
Social Democrats	1	▲1	1,267	1.63	New
Sinn Féin	0	▼3	2,656	3.43	▼6.22
Aontú	0	Steady	728	0.94	New
Éirígí	0	Steady	631	0.81	New
Independent	5	▼1	7,959	10.27	▼5.27
Total	40	Steady	77,505	100.00	

== Results by local electoral area ==
*: Outgoing councillor elected in 2014.
†: Outgoing councillor coopted subsequent to the 2014 election.

=== Blackrock ===
Blackrock: 6 seats
Party	Candidate	FPv%	Count								
Party	Candidate	FPv%	1	2	3	4	5	6	7	8	9
Green	Séafra Ó Faoláin	24.95%	3,128								
Fine Gael	Marie Baker	16.76%	2,101								
Fianna Fáil	Mary Hanafin	14.72%	1,846								
Fine Gael	Barry Ward (Note: See change below.)	9.62%	1,206	1,464	1,564	1,568	1,628	1,638	1,677	2,420	
Fianna Fáil	Kate Feeney	8.74%	1,096	1,285	1,331	1,354	1,447	1,476	1,532	1,657	1,873
Fine Gael	Rebecca Molloy	6.14%	770	980	1,048	1,054	1,097	1,104	1,133		
Labour	Deirdre Kingston	5.12%	642	893	916	928	979	983	1,156	1,217	1,412
People Before Profit	Lola Hynes	4.73%	593	729	735	814	867	869			
Social Democrats	Sinéad Gibney	4.40%	552	754	766	805	873	875	1,189	1,238	1,283
Independent	Reji Chacko Jacob	3.17%	397	504	516	536					
Sinn Féin	Grainne Ferris	1.64%	206	229	231						
Electorate: 26,344 Valid: 12,537 Spoilt: 271 Quota: 1,792 Turnout: 12,808 (48.62%)

=== Dundrum ===
Dundrum: 7 seats
Party	Candidate	FPv%	Count								
Party	Candidate	FPv%	1	2	3	4	5	6	7	8	9
Green	Daniel Dunne	19.63%	2,897								
Independent	Sean McLoughlin	10.88%	1,606	1,660	1,700	1,743	1,838	1,920			
Fianna Fáil	Shay Brennan	10.07%	1,487	1,549	1,566	1,612	1,629	1,770	1,843	1,847	
Fine Gael	Anna Grainger	8.54%	1,261	1,377	1,382	1,415	1,432	1,461	1,488	1,490	1,908
Fianna Fáil	Olivia Buckley	7.54%	1,113	1,178	1,184	1,211	1,231	1,288	1,328	1,334	1,442
Fine Gael	Pat Hand	6.90%	1,019	1,081	1,086	1,121	1,135	1,170	1,216	1,216	
Labour	Peter O'Brien	6.66%	983	1,258	1,299	1,327	1,475	1,506	1,660	1,667	1,762
Fine Gael	Jim O'Leary	6.53%	964	1,035	1,041	1,081	1,098	1,210	1,233	1,239	1,536
Independent	Anne Colgan	6.16%	909	1,015	1,031	1,078	1,172	1,303	1,482	1,508	1,598
Aontú	Liam Coughlan	4.93%	728	757	771	805	828				
Éirígí	Brian Leeson	4.27%	631	673	719	730	852	903			
People Before Profit	Eoghan Pádraig Ó Ceannabháin	3.49%	515	625	701	727					
Independent	Seamas O'Neill	2.38%	351	383	401						
Sinn Féin	Sorcha Nic Cormaic	2.01%	297	324							
Electorate: 30,064 Valid: 14,761 Spoilt: 384 Quota: 1,846 Turnout: 15,145 (50.38%)

=== Dún Laoghaire ===
Dún Laoghaire: 7 seats
Party	Candidate	FPv%	Count									
Party	Candidate	FPv%	1	2	3	4	5	6	7	8	9	10
Green	Ossian Smyth	20.16%	3,147									
Fianna Fáil	Cormac Devlin	17.20%	2,684									
Fine Gael	John Bailey	9.64%	1,504	1,594	1,690	1,702	1,735	1,759	1,778	1,900	1,996	
Labour	Juliet O'Connell	9.63%	1,503	1,761	1,835	1,868	2,192					
Fine Gael	Lorraine Hall	8.58%	1,339	1,465	1,520	1,526	1,567	1,603	1,611	1,747	1,819	1,832
People Before Profit	Melissa Halpin	6.84%	1,067	1,194	1,228	1,315	1,355	1,388	1,825	1,889	2,127	
Fine Gael	Mary Fayne	6.07%	947	1,018	1,072	1,080	1,117	1,153	1,166	1,266	1,323	1,338
Independent	Michael Merrigan	4.90%	765	824	862	908	934	949	1,002	1,053		
Social Democrats	Dave Quinn	4.58%	715	949	970	995	1,035	1,102	1,181	1,283	1,476	1,564
Fianna Fáil	Justin Moylan	3.50%	547	593	885	903	928	936	951			
People Before Profit	Dave O'Keeffe	3.45%	538	611	634	717	730	751				
Labour	Valerie McDermott	3.21%	501	594	623	633						
Sinn Féin	Séamus Mac Floinn	2.26%	352	370	386							
Electorate: 33,876 Valid: 15,609 Spoilt: 409 Quota: 1,952 Turnout: 16,018 (47.28%)

=== Glencullen–Sandyford ===
Glencullen–Sandyford: 7 seats
Party	Candidate	FPv%	Count								
Party	Candidate	FPv%	1	2	3	4	5	6	7	8	9
Labour	Lettie McCarthy	22.01%	2,269								
Green	Deirdre Ní Fhloinn	15.51%	1,599								
Independent	Michael Fleming	11.87%	1,224	1,455							
Fine Gael	Emma Blain	9.69%	999	1,115	1,160	1,184	1,193	1,257	1,305		
Fianna Fáil	Tom Murphy	8.19%	844	974	994	1,025	1,028	1,120	1,357		
Independent	Lynsey McGovern	6.02%	621	728	784	809	895	1,016	1,087	1,110	1,219
Fine Gael	Kazi Ahmed	5.99%	618	713	759	780	796	843	894	912	1,334
Fianna Fáil	Ben Stafford	5.19%	535	603	605	617	636	664			
Fine Gael	Sandra Stewart	4.98%	513	587	638	647	652	683	716	732	
Sinn Féin	Shaun Tracey	4.69%	484	535	554	558	656	673	762	773	788
Independent	Kevin Daly	3.57%	368	436	457	490	507				
People Before Profit	Ruth O'Connor	2.28%	235	275	325	332					
Electorate: 27,705 Valid: 10,309 Spoilt: 222 Quota: 1,289 Turnout: 10,531 (38.01%)

=== Killiney–Shankill ===
Killiney–Shankill: 7 seats
Party	Candidate	FPv%	Count								
Party	Candidate	FPv%	1	2	3	4	5	6	7	8	9
Green	Una Power	16.63%	2,193								
Labour	Carrie Smyth	12.81%	1,689								
Fine Gael	Jennifer Carroll MacNeill	12.21%	1,610	1,691							
People Before Profit	Hugh Lewis	8.66%	1,142	1,198	1,201	1,204	1,251	1,291	1,796		
Fine Gael	Jim Gildea	8.13%	1,072	1,104	1,112	1,117	1,132	1,189	1,206	1,210	1,706
Sinn Féin	Shane O'Brien	8.03%	1,059	1,082	1,083	1,084	1,097	1,111	1,179	1,249	1,285
Labour	Denis O'Callaghan	7.99%	1,053	1,160	1,163	1,181	1,202	1,267	1,358	1,414	1,565
Fine Gael	Frank McNamara	7.14%	942	1,004	1,017	1,021	1,051	1,133	1,159	1,167	
Fianna Fáil	Michael Clark	5.51%	726	744	745	747	816	1,166	1,179	1,193	1,344
Fianna Fáil	Helena Kelly	5.21%	687	723	731	734	761				
People Before Profit	Danielle O'Rourke	5.07%	669	770	774	777	811	856			
Independent	Sandra Archer	2.62%	345	373	374	375					
Electorate: 30,387 Valid: 13,187 Spoilt: 381 Quota: 1,649 Turnout: 13,568 (44.65%)

=== Stillorgan ===
Stillorgan: 6 seats
Party	Candidate	FPv%	Count							
Party	Candidate	FPv%	1	2	3	4	5	6	7	8
Fine Gael	Barry Saul	21.40%	2,376							
Green	Eva Elizabeth Dowling	20.45%	2,270							
Fine Gael	Maeve O'Connell	11.46%	1,272	1,571	1,698					
Fianna Fáil	Dónal Smith	10.30%	1,143	1,228	1,278	1,292	1,302	1,367	1,392	1,488
Fianna Fáil	Liam Dockery	8.34%	926	980	1,023	1,035	1,045	1,099	1,128	1,210
Independent	Deirdre Donnelly	8.34%	926	1,009	1,090	1,122	1,128	1,247	1,410	1,641
Fine Gael	John Kennedy	5.79%	643	809	877	889	945	1,040	1,066	1,282
Labour	Paul Gordon	4.43%	492	530	697	726	743	801	968	
Independent	Gearóid O'Keeffe	4.03%	447	494	527	548	551			
People Before Profit	Rachael Prendergast Spollen	3.14%	349	358	447	553	559	607		
Sinn Féin	Rosie Ní Laoghaire	2.32%	258	266	291					
Electorate: 22,993 Valid: 11,102 Spoilt: 231 Quota: 1,587 Turnout: 11,333 (49.29%)

== Results by gender ==
2019 Dún Laoghaire–Rathdown County Council election Candidates by gender
Gender	Number of candidates	% of candidates	Elected councillors	% of councillors
Men	39	53.4%	21	52.5%
Women	34	46.6%	19	47.5%
TOTAL	73		40	

== Changes ==
=== Co-options ===
Party	Outgoing	LEA	Reason	Date	Co-optee
Fine Gael	John Bailey	Dún Laoghaire	Death on 9 July 2019	14 October 2019	Mary Fayne
Green	Ossian Smyth	Dún Laoghaire	Elected to 33rd Dáil at the 2020 general election	24 February 2020	Tom Kivlehan
Fianna Fáil	Cormac Devlin	Dún Laoghaire	Elected to 33rd Dáil at the 2020 general election	24 February 2020	Justin Moylan
Fine Gael	Jennifer Carroll MacNeill	Killiney–Shankill	Elected to 33rd Dáil at the 2020 general election	24 February 2020	Frank McNamara
Fine Gael	Barry Ward	Blackrock	Elected to 26th Seanad at the 2020 Seanad election	6 July 2020	Maurice Dockrell
Labour	Deirdre Kingston	Blackrock	Resignation	6 July 2020	Martha Fanning
Green	Deirdre Ní Fhloinn	Glencullen–Sandyford	Resignation on 12 October 2020	14 December 2020	Oisín O'Connor
Green	Séafra Ó Faoláin	Blackrock	Resignation	August 2022	Kate Ruddock

=== Changes in affiliation ===
Name	LEA	Elected as	New affiliation	Date
Hugh Lewis	Killiney-Shankill	Solidarity–PBP	Independent	May 2021
Juliet O'Connell	Dún Laoghaire	Labour	Independent	19 April 2024

== Sources ==
- "Dún Laoghaire-Rathdown County Council - Local Election candidates". RTÉ. 5 May 2019. Archived from the original on 6 June 2019.
- "Election of members of Dún Laoghaire-Rathdown County Council [Nominations]" (PDF). Dún Laoghaire–Rathdown County Council. 4 May 2019. Archived (PDF) from the original on 25 May 2019.
- "Local Elections 2019 Latest Results". Dún Laoghaire-Rathdown County Council. 20 May 2019. Archived from the original on 1 June 2019.
- "Local Elections 2019: Results, Transfer of Votes and Statistics" (PDF). Government of Ireland. Department of Housing, Planning and Local Government (DHPLG). pp. 98–103.
