= Ossian Smyth =

Irish former politician

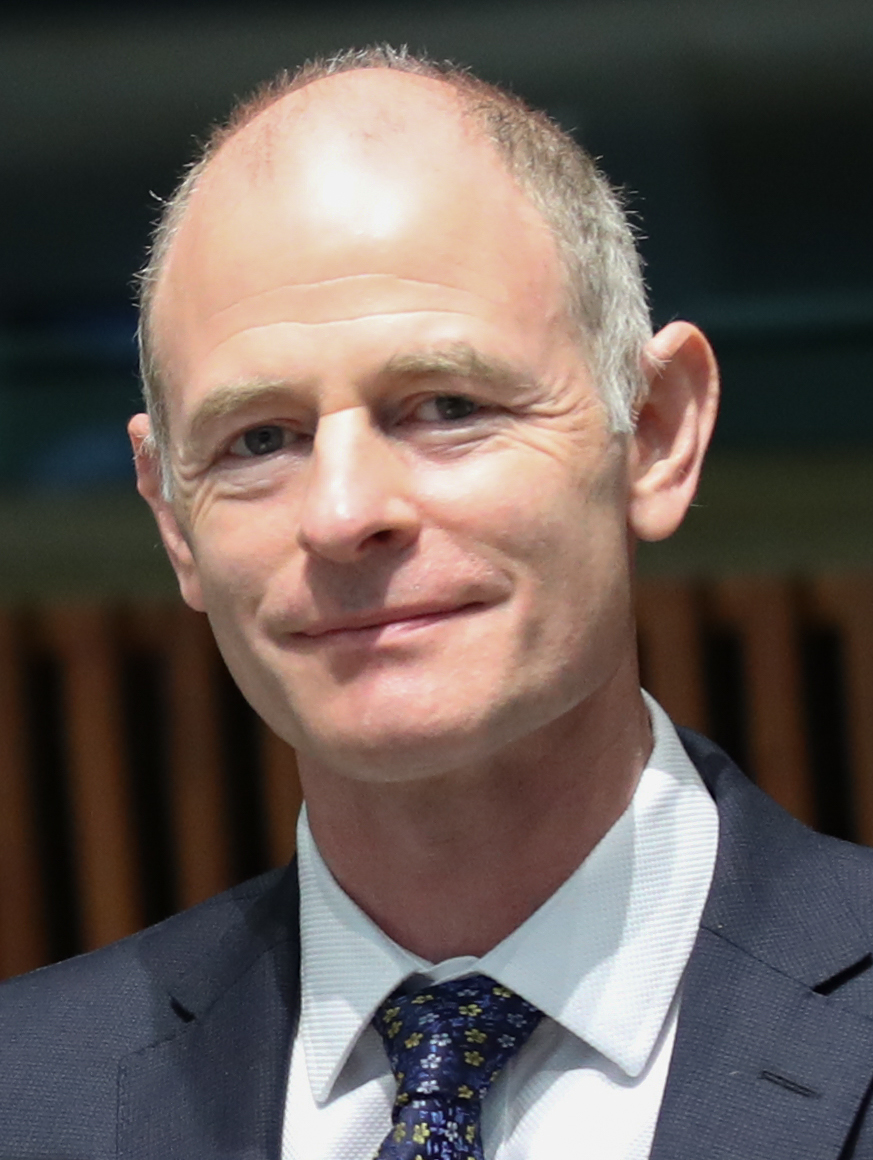
- Smyth in 2021

Minister of State
- 2020–2025: Public Expenditure, NDP Delivery and Reform
- 2020–2025: Environment, Climate and Communications

Teachta Dála
- In office February 2020 – November 2024
- Constituency: Dún Laoghaire

Personal details
- Born: 1971/1972 (age 54–55)
- Party: Green Party
- Education: Trinity College Dublin

Ossian Smyth (born 1971/1972) is an Irish Green Party politician who served as a Minister of State from July 2020 to January 2025. He was a Teachta Dála (TD) for the Dún Laoghaire constituency from 2020 to 2024.

Smyth holds a Bachelor of Arts in computer science from Trinity College Dublin.

Smyth was elected to Dún Laoghaire–Rathdown County Council for the Dún Laoghaire local electoral area at the 2014 local election. He served as Cathaoirleach of the County Council from 2018 to 2019. He was re-elected to the council at the 2019 local election, and at the general election in February 2020, he was elected as a TD for Dún Laoghaire. Tom Kivlehan was co-opted to Smyth's seat on the County Council.

Following the formation of a new government of Fianna Fáil, Fine Gael and the Green Party, Smyth was appointed as a Minister of State on 1 July 2020. He was appointed as Minister of State at the Department of Public Expenditure and Reform with responsibility for Public Procurement and eGovernment and Minister of State at the Department of the Environment, Climate and Communications with responsibility for Communications and Circular Economy.

He lost his seat at the 2024 general election. He unsuccessfully contested the 2025 Seanad election for the Dublin University constituency.

Political offices
Preceded by Seán Canney as Minister of State at the Department of Communications, Climate Action and Environment	Minister of State at the Department of the Environment, Climate and Communications; 2020–2025; With: Hildegarde Naughton	Succeeded by Alan Dillon
Preceded by Patrick O'Donovan; Kevin "Boxer" Moran	Minister of State at the Department of Public Expenditure, NDP Delivery and Reform; 2020–2025; With: Patrick O'Donovan	Succeeded by Emer Higgins

Dáil	Election	Deputy (Party)	Deputy (Party)	Deputy (Party)	Deputy (Party)	Deputy (Party)
21st	1977	David Andrews (FF)	Liam Cosgrave (FG)	Barry Desmond (Lab)	Martin O'Donoghue (FF)	4 seats 1977–1981
22nd	1981	David Andrews (FF)	Liam T. Cosgrave (FG)	Barry Desmond (Lab)	Martin O'Donoghue (FF)	Seán Barrett (FG)
23rd	1982 (Feb)	David Andrews (FF)	Liam T. Cosgrave (FG)	Barry Desmond (Lab)	Martin O'Donoghue (FF)	Seán Barrett (FG)
24th	1982 (Nov)	David Andrews (FF)	Liam T. Cosgrave (FG)	Barry Desmond (Lab)	Monica Barnes (FG)	Seán Barrett (FG)
25th	1987	David Andrews (FF)	Geraldine Kennedy (PDs)	Barry Desmond (Lab)	Monica Barnes (FG)	Seán Barrett (FG)
26th	1989	David Andrews (FF)	Brian Hillery (FF)	Eamon Gilmore (WP)	Monica Barnes (FG)	Seán Barrett (FG)
27th	1992	David Andrews (FF)	Helen Keogh (PDs)	Eamon Gilmore (DL)	Niamh Bhreathnach (Lab)	Seán Barrett (FG)
28th	1997	David Andrews (FF)	Monica Barnes (FG)	Eamon Gilmore (Lab)	Mary Hanafin (FF)	Seán Barrett (FG)
29th	2002	Barry Andrews (FF)	Fiona O'Malley (PDs)	Eamon Gilmore (Lab)	Mary Hanafin (FF)	Ciarán Cuffe (GP)
30th	2007	Barry Andrews (FF)	Seán Barrett (Note: Served as Ceann Comhairle in the 31st Dáil from 2011 to 2016 and was returned automatically at the 2016 general election.) (FG)	Eamon Gilmore (Lab)	Mary Hanafin (FF)	Ciarán Cuffe (GP)
31st	2011	Mary Mitchell O'Connor (FG)	Seán Barrett (FG)	Eamon Gilmore (Lab)	Richard Boyd Barrett (PBP)	4 seats from 2011
32nd	2016	Mary Mitchell O'Connor (FG)	Seán Barrett (FG)	Maria Bailey (FG)	Richard Boyd Barrett (AAA–PBP)	4 seats from 2011
33rd	2020	Jennifer Carroll MacNeill (FG)	Ossian Smyth (GP)	Cormac Devlin (FF)	Richard Boyd Barrett (S–PBP)	4 seats from 2011
34th	2024	Jennifer Carroll MacNeill (FG)	Barry Ward (FG)	Cormac Devlin (FF)	Richard Boyd Barrett (PBP–S)	4 seats from 2011
