= Labour Party Front Bench (Ireland) =

The Labour Party is the fifth-largest political party in Dáil Éireann. The Labour Party leader appoints a team of TDs, Senators and MEPs to speak for the party on different issues. When the Labour Party was in Government their front bench consisted of the ministerial officeholders. The Labour Party has been in opposition since March 2016 and accordingly, their front bench areas of responsibility broadly correspond to those of Government ministers. The current front bench was announced on 7 February 2025.

== Labour Party Frontbench ==
Portfolio	Name	Elected office
Party leader Spokesperson on Northern Ireland	Ivana Bacik	TD for Dublin Bay South
Parliamentary party chairperson Spokesperson on Finance; Spokesperson for Public Expenditure, Infrastructure, Public Service Reform and Digitalisation	Ged Nash	TD for Louth
Party Whip; Spokesperson for Defence; Spokesperson for Foreign Affairs and Trade	Duncan Smith	TD for Dublin Fingal East
Deputy Whip; Spokesperson for Housing, Local Government and Heritage	Conor Sheehan	TD for Limerick City
Spokesperson for Education and Youth	Eoghan Kenny	TD for Cork North-Central
Spokesperson for Transport; Spokesperson for Climate, Environment and Energy	Ciarán Ahern	TD for Dublin South-West
Spokesperson for Justice, Home Affairs and Migration	Alan Kelly	TD for Tipperary North
Spokesperson for Enterprise, Tourism and Employment	George Lawlor	TD for Wexford
Spokesperson for Agriculture, Food and the Marine; Spokesperson for Arts, Media, Communications, Culture and Sport	Robert O'Donoghue	TD for Dublin Fingal West
Spokesperson for Health	Marie Sherlock	TD for Dublin Central
Spokesperson for Children, Disability and Equality; Spokesperson for Social Protection	Mark Wall	TD for Kildare South
Spokesperson for Dublin	Aodhán Ó Ríordáin	MEP for Dublin
Spokesperson for Rural and Community Development, the Gaeltacht and Workers' Rights	Nessa Cosgrove	Senator for the Labour Panel
Spokesperson for Further and Higher Education, Research, Innovation and Science and Disability	Laura Harmon	Senator for the Industrial and Commercial Panel

== See also ==
- Fianna Fáil Front Bench
- Fine Gael Front Bench
- Green Party Front Bench
- Sinn Féin Front Bench
- Social Democrats Front Bench (Ireland)
