= Seán Canney =

Irish politician (born 1960)

Seán Canney TD
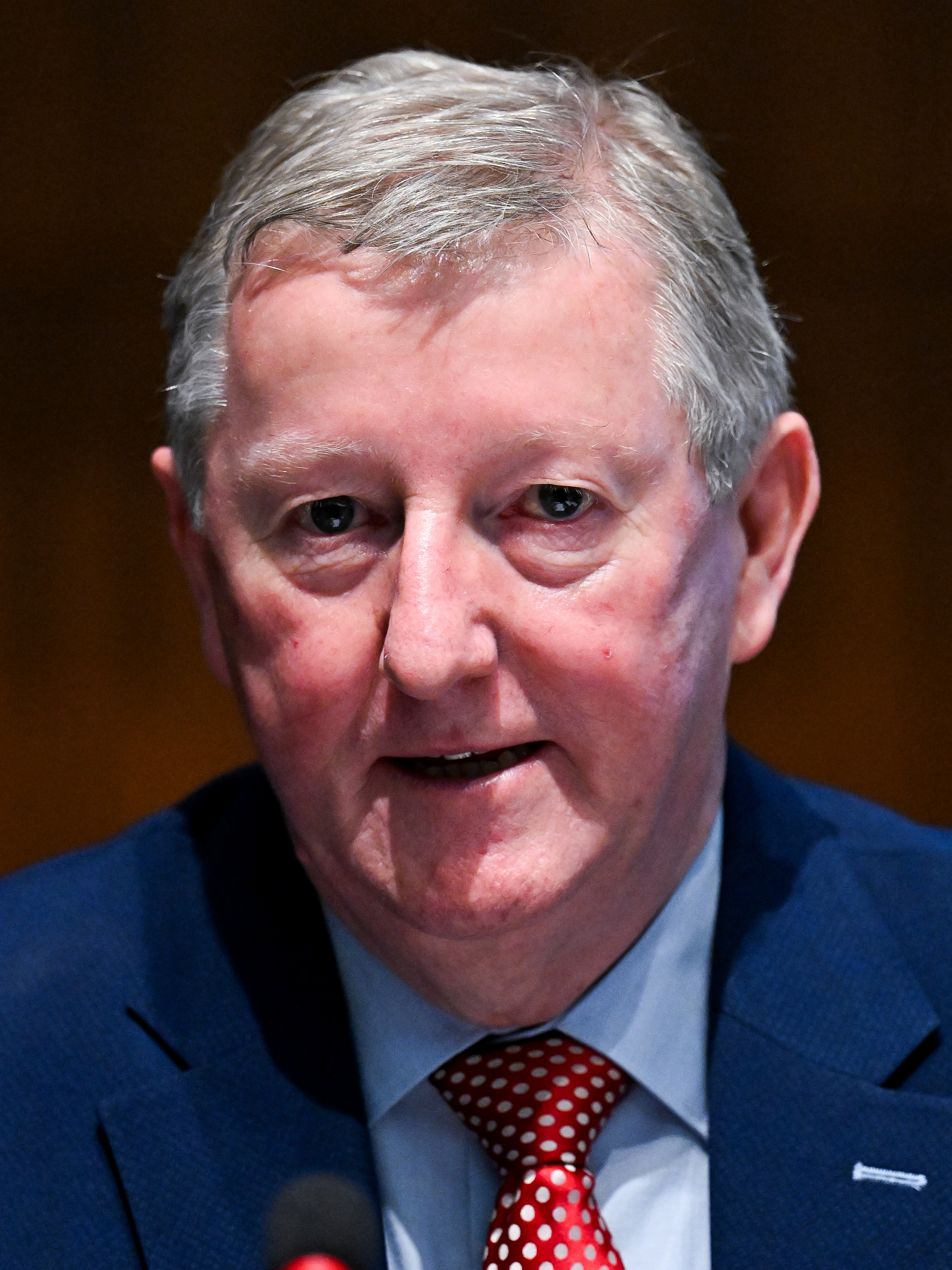
- Canney in 2025

Minister of State
- 2025–: Transport
- 2018–2020: Rural and Community Development
- 2018–2020: Communications, Climate Action and Environment
- 2016–2017: Public Expenditure and Reform

Teachta Dála
- Incumbent
- Assumed office February 2016
- Constituency: Galway East

Personal details
- Born: 1959/1960 (age 65–66) Belclare, County Galway, Ireland
- Party: Independent
- Other political affiliations: Independent Alliance (2016–2018)
- Spouse: Geraldine McHugh (m. 1997)
- Children: 3
- Education: Institute of Technology, Sligo
- Website: seancanney.com

Seán Canney (born 1959/1960) is an Irish independent politician who has been a Teachta Dála (TD) for the Galway East constituency since 2016. He has served as a Minister of State since January 2025, and previously from 2016 to 2017 and again from 2018 to 2020.

A native of Belclare, Tuam, County Galway. Canney was campaign manager for his brother-in-law, Paddy McHugh, in the 2002 general election, in which McHugh gained a seat in the Galway East constituency.

As an independent candidate, Canney was elected to Galway County Council in 2004, on his first attempt. He was re-elected in each of the subsequent local elections in 2009 and 2014. In both the 2009 and 2014 elections, he topped the poll in the Tuam local electoral area.

He was an unsuccessful candidate in the 2011 general election in the Galway East constituency, receiving 5,567 first preference votes.

He served as Mayor of County Galway for the term 2007 to 2008, and served on a number of boards and committees. He joined the Independent Alliance in advance of the 2016 general election. At the 2016 general election, he topped the poll in Galway East, securing 8,447 first preference votes. After lengthy government formation talks, the Independent Alliance supported the nomination of Enda Kenny as Taoiseach on 6 May 2016, allowing Kenny to become the first leader of Fine Gael to be re-appointed to this office.

He was appointed a member of the Committee on Housing and Homelessness, a position he held until his appointment on 19 May 2016 by the new government as Minister of State at the Department of Public Expenditure and Reform with special responsibility for the Office of Public Works and Flood Relief. He served in that position until 3 June 2017, when he was succeeded by Kevin "Boxer" Moran, part of an arrangement within the Independent Alliance.

He has advocated the reopening the Western Rail Corridor to trains from Galway to Claremorris and Tuam railway station.

He left the Independent Alliance in May 2018, but continued to support the government.

In a reshuffle after the resignation of Denis Naughten from cabinet, Canney returned to the ministerial ranks on 16 October 2018. On 13 October 2018, he was appointed by the government on nomination by Leo Varadkar as Department of Rural and Community Development and at the Department of Communications, Climate Action and Environment with special responsibility for natural resources, community affairs and digital development.

Canney was re-elected at the February 2020 general election. He stayed in ministerial office until the formation of a new government on 27 June 2020. He sat in the Regional Group in the 33rd Dáil.

He was re-elected to the Dáil at the 2024 general election and was a member of the Regional Independent Group. On 23 January 2025, he was appointed as a Minister of State at the Department of Transport with responsibility for International and road transport, logistics, rail and ports. He is also a super junior minister, one of four Ministers of State in attendance at cabinet, but without a vote. In December 2025, he received criticism from road safety groups for abandoning a planned restructuring of the Road Safety Authority which had been announced by his predecessor, James Lawless.

Political offices
Preceded by Simon Harris	Minister of State at the Department of Public Expenditure and Reform; 2016–2017; With: Eoghan Murphy	Succeeded by Kevin "Boxer" Moran; Eoghan Murphy
Preceded by Seán Kyne	Minister of State at the Department of Communications, Climate Action and Environment; 2018–2020	Succeeded by Hildegarde Naughton; Ossian Smyth as Ministers of State at the Department of the Environment, Climate and Communications
Preceded by Seán Kyne	Department of Rural and Community Development; 2018–2020	Succeeded by Joe O'Brien
Preceded by James Lawless	Minister of State at the Department of Transport; 2025–present With: Jerry Buttimer	Incumbent

Dáil	Election	Deputy (Party)	Deputy (Party)	Deputy (Party)	Deputy (Party)
9th	1937	Frank Fahy (FF)	Mark Killilea Snr (FF)	Patrick Beegan (FF)	Seán Broderick (FG)
10th	1938	Frank Fahy (FF)	Mark Killilea Snr (FF)	Patrick Beegan (FF)	Seán Broderick (FG)
11th	1943	Frank Fahy (FF)	Mark Killilea Snr (FF)	Patrick Beegan (FF)	Michael Donnellan (CnaT)
12th	1944	Frank Fahy (FF)	Mark Killilea Snr (FF)	Patrick Beegan (FF)	Michael Donnellan (CnaT)
13th	1948	Constituency abolished. See Galway North and Galway South			

Dáil	Election	Deputy (Party)	Deputy (Party)	Deputy (Party)	Deputy (Party)	Deputy (Party)
17th	1961	Michael F. Kitt (FF)	Anthony Millar (FF)	Michael Carty (FF)	Michael Donnellan (CnaT)	Brigid Hogan-O'Higgins (FG)
17th	1964 by-election	Michael F. Kitt (FF)	Anthony Millar (FF)	Michael Carty (FF)	John Donnellan (FG)	Brigid Hogan-O'Higgins (FG)
18th	1965	Michael F. Kitt (FF)	Anthony Millar (FF)	Michael Carty (FF)	John Donnellan (FG)	Brigid Hogan-O'Higgins (FG)
19th	1969	Constituency abolished. See Galway North-East and Clare–South Galway				

Dáil	Election	Deputy (Party)	Deputy (Party)	Deputy (Party)	Deputy (Party)
21st	1977	Johnny Callanan (FF)	Thomas Hussey (FF)	Mark Killilea Jnr (FF)	John Donnellan (FG)
22nd	1981	Johnny Callanan (FF)	Michael P. Kitt (FF)	Paul Connaughton Snr (FG)	3 seats 1981–1997
23rd	1982 (Feb)	Johnny Callanan (FF)	Michael P. Kitt (FF)	Paul Connaughton Snr (FG)	3 seats 1981–1997
23rd	1982 by-election	Noel Treacy (FF)	Michael P. Kitt (FF)	Paul Connaughton Snr (FG)	3 seats 1981–1997
24th	1982 (Nov)	Noel Treacy (FF)	Michael P. Kitt (FF)	Paul Connaughton Snr (FG)	3 seats 1981–1997
25th	1987	Noel Treacy (FF)	Michael P. Kitt (FF)	Paul Connaughton Snr (FG)	3 seats 1981–1997
26th	1989	Noel Treacy (FF)	Michael P. Kitt (FF)	Paul Connaughton Snr (FG)	3 seats 1981–1997
27th	1992	Noel Treacy (FF)	Michael P. Kitt (FF)	Paul Connaughton Snr (FG)	3 seats 1981–1997
28th	1997	Noel Treacy (FF)	Michael P. Kitt (FF)	Paul Connaughton Snr (FG)	Ulick Burke (FG)
29th	2002	Noel Treacy (FF)	Joe Callanan (FF)	Paul Connaughton Snr (FG)	Paddy McHugh (Ind.)
30th	2007	Noel Treacy (FF)	Michael P. Kitt (FF)	Paul Connaughton Snr (FG)	Ulick Burke (FG)
31st	2011	Colm Keaveney (Lab)	Michael P. Kitt (FF)	Ciarán Cannon (FG)	Paul Connaughton Jnr (FG)
32nd	2016	Seán Canney (Ind.)	Anne Rabbitte (FF)	Ciarán Cannon (FG)	3 seats 2016–2024
33rd	2020	Seán Canney (Ind.)	Anne Rabbitte (FF)	Ciarán Cannon (FG)	3 seats 2016–2024
34th	2024	Seán Canney (Ind.)	Albert Dolan (FF)	Peter Roche (FG)	Louis O'Hara (SF)
