= 2024 Dún Laoghaire–Rathdown County Council election =

Part of the 2024 Irish local elections

- 7 June 2024

All 40 seats on Dún Laoghaire–Rathdown County Council 21 seats needed for a majority
	First party	Second party	Third party
Party	Fine Gael	Green	Fianna Fáil
Last election	13	6	7
Seats before	13	6	7
Seats won	16	6	5
Seat change	▲3	Steady	▼2
	Fourth party	Fifth party	Sixth party
Party	Labour	People Before Profit	Social Democrats
Last election	6	2	1
Seats before	6	1	1
Seats won	5	2	1
Seat change	▼1	▲1	Steady
	Seventh party
Party	Independent
Last election	5
Seats before	6
Seats won	5
Seat change	▼1
- Results by LEAs
Council control after election
TBD

An election to all 40 seats on Dún Laoghaire–Rathdown County Council was held on 7 June 2024 as part of the 2024 Irish local elections. Dún Laoghaire–Rathdown is divided into 6 local electoral areas (LEAs) to elect councillors for a five-year term of office on the electoral system of proportional representation by means of the single transferable vote (PR-STV).

The period for nominations started at 10 a.m. on Saturday 11 May and ended at 12 p.m. on Saturday 18 May 2024.

== Retiring incumbents ==
The following councillors did not seek re-election:

Constituency	Departing Councillor	Party	Date announced
Blackrock	Kate Feeney	Fianna Fáil	30 November 2023
Blackrock	Mary Hanafin	Fianna Fáil	30 November 2023
Dún Laoghaire	Juliet O’Connell	Labour	22 April 2024
Dún Laoghaire	Dave Quinn	Social Democrats	6 May 2024
Killiney-Shankill	Dennis O'Callaghan	Labour	

== Campaign ==
In April 2024, Orli Degani, who had been selected by the Social Democrats to contest the Dún Laoghaire LEA was dropped from the ticket. She contested the election as an independent candidate.

== Results by party ==
Party	First-preference votes			Seats				
Party	Votes	% FPv	Swing (pp)	Cand.	2019	Out.	Elected 2024	Change
Fine Gael	25,630	33.27	▲5.97	17	13	13	16	▲3
Fianna Fáil	8,926	11.59	▼6.00	11	7	7	5	▼2
Green	7,331	9.52	▼10.14	6	6	6	6	Steady
Labour	7,804	10.13	▼1.65	7	6	6	5	▼1
Social Democrats	4,307	5.59	▲3.96	6	1	1	1	Steady
Sinn Féin	3,968	5.15	▲1.72	8	0	0	0	Steady
People Before Profit	2,875	3.73	▼2.86	3	2	1	2	Steady
Aontú	2,449	3.18	▲2.24	3	0	0	0	Steady
The Irish People	204	0.26	New	1	New	New	0	Steady
Independent	13,539	17.58	▲7.31	18	5	6	5	Steady
Total Valid	77,033	98.87						
Spoilt votes	879	1.13						
Total	77,033	100.00	—	80	40	40	40	Steady
Registered voters/Turnout	176,321	44.19						

== Results by LEA ==
*: Outgoing councillor elected in 2019.
†: Outgoing councillor coopted subsequent to the 2019 election.
‡: Outgoing councillor elected in 2019 for the Killiney–Shankill LEA.

=== Blackrock ===
Blackrock: 6 Seats
Party	Candidate	FPv%	Count										
Party	Candidate	FPv%	1	2	3	4	5	6	7	8	9	10	11
Fine Gael	Marie Baker	25.02%	3,045										
Green	Conor Dowling	9.82%	1,195	1,279	1,281	1,311	1,340	1,361	1,469	1,523	1,795		
Fianna Fáil	Michael Clark	9.18%	1,117	1,272	1,277	1,304	1,319	1,368	1,382	1,784			
Fine Gael	Maurice Dockrell	7.70%	937	1,310	1,313	1,322	1,329	1,369	1,378	1,461	1,509	1,513	1,530
Labour	Martha Fanning	7.50%	912	1,018	1,020	1,052	1,081	1,118	1,222	1,292	1,683	1,724	1,729
Independent	Cormac Lucey	7.43%	904	972	1,042	1,078	1,112	1,301	1,369	1,418	1,506	1,512	1,517
Fine Gael	Dan Carson	6.62%	806	1,151	1,155	1,198	1,212	1,246	1,294	1,407	1,496	1,501	1,519
Fianna Fáil	Michael Reynolds	5.80%	706	785	787	799	811	853	877				
Social Democrats	Lydia Bigley	5.19%	631	674	678	699	741	776	1,043	1,067			
PBP–Solidarity	Cian Mac Aonghusa	4.70%	572	581	595	613	752	776					
Aontú	Helen Duignan	4.01%	488	503	531	565	597						
Sinn Féin	Callie Nic Rállaigh	3.07%	374	381	398	410							
Independent	Reji Chacko Jacob	2.46%	299	319	324								
Independent	Jonathan Roe	1.50%	182	184									
Electorate: 27,471 Valid: 12,168 Spoilt: 112 Quota: 1,739 Turnout: 12,280 (44.7%)

A complete recount took place in Blackrock resulting in newcomer Dan Carson beating Independent Cormac Lucey for the last seat by just two votes.

=== Dundrum ===
Dundrum: 7 Seats
Party	Candidate	FPv%	Count										
Party	Candidate	FPv%	1	2	3	4	5	6	7	8	9	10	11
Independent	Sean McLoughlin	16.14%	2,310										
Fine Gael	Jim O'Leary	13.53%	1,937										
Fianna Fáil	Shay Brennan	11.26%	1,612	1,687	1,707	1,814							
Labour	Peter O'Brien	8.92%	1,277	1,340	1,353	1,361	1,367	1,396	1,497	1,602	2,018		
Green	Robert Jones	8.39%	1,201	1,230	1,238	1,243	1,245	1,262	1,314	1,424	1,705	1,866	
Fine Gael	Anna Grainger	8.22%	1,177	1,205	1,249	1,273	1,276	1,280	1,304	1,759	1,823		
Aontú	Liam Coughlan	6.74%	964	1,004	1,008	1,022	1,106	1,120	1,229	1,270	1,315	1,326	1,330
Independent	Anne Colgan	6.18%	885	974	982	995	1,048	1,065	1,160	1,236	1,392	1,449	1,506
Social Democrats	Síle Ní Dhubhghaill	6.02%	862	903	906	909	920	943	1,119	1,150			
Fine Gael	Eoin O'Driscoll	5.44%	779	823	867	886	893	900	923				
Sinn Féin	Rachel Gerrard	4.02%	576	606	607	609	613	845					
Sinn Féin	Cuán Young	2.26%	324	368	369	374	382						
The Irish People	Conor Patrick Rafferty	1.42%	204	229	229	233							
Fianna Fáil	Fiona Murray	1.42%	203	216	218								
Electorate: 31,022 Valid: 14,311 Spoilt: 145 Quota: 1,789 Turnout: 14,456 (46.6%)

=== Dún Laoghaire ===
Dún Laoghaire: 7 Seats
Party	Candidate	FPv%	Count						
Party	Candidate	FPv%	1	2	3	4	5	6	7
Fine Gael	Lorraine Hall	12.46%	1,936	1,944					
Green	Tom Kivlehan	11.25%	1,749	1,763	1,818	1,903	2,157		
Fine Gael	J.P. Durkan	10.23%	1,590	1,594	1,657	1,722	1,787	1,803	1,830
PBP–Solidarity	Melisa Halpin	10.09%	1,568	1,594	1,612	1,710	1,932	1,985	
Fine Gael	Mary Fayne	9.93%	1,543	1,549	1,601	1,660	1,721	1,741	1,771
Fianna Fáil	Justin Moylan	8.8%	1,368	1,372	1,700	1,725	1,768	1,773	1,849
Labour	Thomas Joseph	8.1%	1,259	1,266	1,301	1,392	1,579	1,678	1,890
Aontú	Mairéad Tóibín	6.4%	997	1,094	1,134	1,216	1,254	1,260	1,534
Sinn Féin	Shane O'Brien	6.03%	937	957	977	999	1,057	1,072	
Social Democrats	Hugo Mills	5.79%	900	911	946	997			
Fianna Fáil	Colette O'Sullivan	4.48%	696	702					
Independent	Orli Degani	3.8%	591	705	721				
Independent	Cathy Lynch	1.73%	269						
Independent	Sara Kelly	0.9%	140						
Electorate: 36,391 Valid: 15,543 Spoilt: 201 Quota: 1,943 Turnout: 15,744 (43.26%)

=== Glencullen–Sandyford ===
Glencullen–Sandyford: 7 Seats
Party	Candidate	FPv%	Count							
Party	Candidate	FPv%	1	2	3	4	5	6	7	8
Independent	Michael Fleming	32.91%	3,687							
Labour	Lettie McCarthy	16.68%	1,869							
Green	Oisín O'Connor	10.17%	1,140	1,391	1,500					
Fine Gael	Pierce Dargan	9.38%	1,051	1,395	1,474					
Fine Gael	Kazi Ahmed	7.2%	807	1,038	1,116	1,144	1,178	1,258	1,331	1,518
Fianna Fáil	Tom Murphy	5.56%	623	960	1,022	1,033	1,041	1,065	1,089	1,425
Fianna Fáil	Elaine Dunne	4.27%	479	691	729	740	752	787	836	
Independent	Kevin Daly	3.66%	410	905	942	951	956	1,011	1,104	1,199
Sinn Féin	Shaun Tracey	3.46%	388	570	578	583	583	810	990	1,024
Social Democrats	Aoife Murtagh	3.38%	379	480	523	551	558	593		
Sinn Féin	Amanda Spiteri	1.74%	195	269	278	278	278			
Independent	Roopesh Kumar Panicker	1.55%	174	233	238	240	243			
Electorate: 25,351 Valid: 11,202 Spoilt: 126 Quota: 1,401 Turnout: 11,328 (44.68%)

=== Killiney–Shankill ===
Killiney–Shankill: 7 Seats
Party	Candidate	FPv%	Count										
Party	Candidate	FPv%	1	2	3	4	5	6	7	8	9	10	11
Labour	Carrie Smyth	13.47%	1,790										
Fine Gael	Jim Gildea	12.08%	1,605	1,625	1,634	1,644	1,664						
Fine Gael	Frank McNamara	11.95%	1,587	1,602	1,613	1,623	1,663						
Independent	Hugh Lewis	9.5%	1,261	1,271	1,297	1,438	1,507	1,588	1,834				
Fine Gael	Jacqueline Burke	9.34%	1,241	1,251	1,257	1,270	1,300	1,381	1,397	1,402	1,853		
Green	Lauren Tuite	7.27%	966	983	990	996	1,061	1,274	1,287	1,297	1,465	1,611	1,614
Sinn Féin	Roland Kennedy	6.75%	897	902	906	924	962	1,028	1,084	1,110	1,139	1,159	1,160
Fianna Fáil	SallyAnn Moylan	6.5%	864	870	887	899	917	954	983	986			
PBP–Solidarity	Dave O'Keeffe	5.53%	735	740	747	776	829	1,017	1,062	1,098	1,137	1,165	1,166
Social Democrats	Lesley Byrne	5.16%	686	693	698	708	765						
Independent	Fergus Power	4.89%	650	651	743	807	814	826					
Labour	James Kearney	2.96%	393	414	416	431							
Independent	Tracey Hennessy	2.59%	344	346	389								
Independent	Michael O'Doherty	1.57%	208	209									
Independent	Susan Muldoon	0.04%	58	59									
Electorate: 32,023 Valid: 13,285 Spoilt: 184 Quota: 1,659 Turnout: 13,449 (42%)

=== Stillorgan ===
Stillorgan: 6 Seats
Party	Candidate	FPv%	Count								
Party	Candidate	FPv%	1	2	3	4	5	6	7	8	9
Fine Gael	Barry Saul	24.75%	2,605								
Fine Gael	Maeve O'Connell	18.12%	1,907								
Fianna Fáil	Liam Dockery	10.43%	1,098	1,250	1,373	1,456	1,467	1,665			
Green	Eva Dowling	10.26%	1,080	1,168	1,248	1,277	1,312	1,341	1,496	1,559	
Fine Gael	John Kennedy	10.23%	1,077	1,687							
Social Democrats	John Hurley	8.07%	849	904	944	955	1,054	1,065	1,210	1,227	1,318
Independent	Deirdre Donnelly	6.63%	698	775	821	839	865	873	901	918	1,252
Independent	Eliza Connolly	4.46%	469	503	527	535	572	582	604	627	
Labour	Rebekah Fozzard	2.89%	304	324	354	363	395	414			
Sinn Féin	Sorcha Nic Cormaic	2.63%	277	288	291	292					
Fianna Fáil	Emer O'Neill	1.52%	160	213	271	295	301				
Electorate: 24,063 Valid: 10,524 Spoilt: 111 Quota: 1,504 Turnout: 10,635 (44.2%)
