= Minister of State at the Department of Transport =

List of Irish ministers of state

The minister of state at the Department of Transport is a junior ministerial post in the Department of Transport of the Government of Ireland who may perform functions delegated by the minister for transport. A minister of state does not hold cabinet rank.

The Department of Transport and Power was created in 1959; in 1984, as the Department of Transport, it was abolished and its functions were transferred to the Department of Communications. The Department of the Public Service was created in 1973; in 1987, its original functions were transferred to the Department of Finance, and it is the legal predecessor of the current Department of Transport. For this reason, the lists below show overlapping departments.

As of January 2025, there are two ministers of state:

- Seán Canney, TD – Minister of State with responsibility for international and road transport, logistics, rail and ports. Canney is also a super junior minister, which is a minister of state in attendance at cabinet, but without a vote.
- Jerry Buttimer, TD – Minister of State with responsibility for rural transport. Buttimer is also Minister of State at the Department of Rural and Community Development and the Gaeltacht.

== List of parliamentary secretaries ==
=== Department of Transport and Power 1959–1977 ===
| Name | Term of office | | Party | Government |
| Patrick Lalor | 16 November 1966 | 2 July 1969 | Fianna Fáil | 12th |
=== Department of Tourism and Transport 1977–1978 ===
| Name | Term of office | | Party | Government |
| Tom Fitzpatrick | 5 July 1977 | 1 January 1978 | Fianna Fáil | 15th |
=== Department of the Public Service 1973–1978 ===
| Name | Term of office | | Party | Government |
| Patrick J. Reynolds | 17 December 1976 | 25 May 1977 | Fine Gael | 14th |

== List of ministers of state ==
=== Department of Tourism and Transport 1978–1980 ===
| Name | Term of office | | Party | Responsibilities | Government |
| Thomas J. Fitzpatrick | 1 January 1978 | 11 December 1979 | Fianna Fáil | | 15th |
=== Department of Transport 1980–1984 ===
| Name | Term of office | | Party | Responsibilities | Government |
| Pádraig Flynn | 25 March 1980 | 30 June 1981 | Fianna Fáil | | 16th |
| Terry Leyden | 23 March 1982 | 14 December 1982 | Fianna Fáil | | 18th |
| John Donnellan | 16 December 1982 | 15 December 1983 | Fine Gael | | 19th |
=== Department of the Public Service 1978–1987 ===
| Name | Term of office | | Party | Responsibilities | Government |
| Ray MacSharry | 1 January 1978 | 11 December 1979 | Fianna Fáil | | 15th |
| Seán Calleary | 12 December 1979 | 30 June 1981 | Fianna Fáil | | 16th |
| Jim O'Keeffe | 13 February 1986 | 10 March 1987 | Fine Gael | | 19th |
=== Department of Tourism and Transport 1987–1991 ===
| Name | Term of office | | Party | Responsibilities | Government |
| Denis Lyons | 31 March 1987 | 12 July 1989 | Fianna Fáil | Tourism | 20th |
| Denis Lyons | 19 July 1989 | 7 February 1991 | Fianna Fáil | Tourism | 21st |
| Frank Fahey | 26 September 1989 | 7 February 1991 | Fianna Fáil | | 21st |
=== Department of Tourism, Transport and Communications 1991–1993 ===
| Name | Term of office | | Party | Responsibilities | Government |
| Denis Lyons | 7 February 1991 | 11 February 1992 | Fianna Fáil | Tourism | 21st |
| Frank Fahey | 7 February 1991 | 11 February 1992 | Fianna Fáil | | 21st |
| Brendan Kenneally | 13 February 1992 | 12 January 1993 | Fianna Fáil | | 22nd |
=== Department of Transport, Energy and Communications 1993–1997 ===
| Name | Term of office | | Party | Responsibilities | Government |
| Noel Treacy | 14 January 1993 | 15 December 1994 | Fianna Fáil | Energy | 23rd |
| Emmet Stagg | 20 December 1994 | 26 June 1997 | Labour | | 24th |
| Avril Doyle | 27 January 1995 | 26 June 1997 | Fine Gael | Consumers of Public Services | 24th |
=== Department of Public Enterprise 1997–2002 ===
| Name | Term of office | | Party | Responsibilities | Government |
| Joe Jacob | 8 July 1997 | 6 June 2002 | Fianna Fáil | Energy | 25th |
=== Department of Transport 2002–2011 ===
| Name | Term of office | | Party | Responsibilities | Government |
| Jim McDaid | 18 June 2002 | 5 October 2004 | Fianna Fáil | Road Traffic and Road Haulage | 26th |
| Ivor Callely | 29 September 2004 | 8 December 2005 | Fianna Fáil | Traffic Management, Road Haulage and the Irish Aviation Authority | 26th |
| Pat "the Cope" Gallagher | 14 February 2006 | 14 June 2007 | Fianna Fáil | Traffic Management, Road Haulage and the Irish Aviation Authority | 26th |
| Noel Ahern | 13 May 2008 | 22 April 2009 | Fianna Fáil | Road Safety | 28th |
| Ciarán Cuffe | 23 March 2010 | 23 January 2011 | Green | Sustainable Travel and Planning | 28th |
=== Department of Transport, Tourism and Sport 2011–2020 ===
| Name | Term of office | | Party | Responsibilities | Government |
| Michael Ring | 10 March 2011 | 6 May 2016 | Fine Gael | Tourism and Sport | 29th |
| Alan Kelly | 10 March 2011 | 11 July 2014 | Labour | Public and Commuter Transport | 29th |
| Ann Phelan | 15 July 2014 | 6 May 2016 | Labour | Rural Transport | 29th |
| Patrick O'Donovan | 19 May 2016 | 14 June 2017 | Fine Gael | Tourism and Sport | 30th |
| Brendan Griffin | 20 June 2017 | 27 June 2020 | Fine Gael | Tourism and Sport | 31st |
=== Department of Transport 2020–present ===
| Name | Term of office | | Party | Responsibilities | Government |
| Hildegarde Naughton | 27 June 2020 | 17 December 2022 | Fine Gael | International and road transport and logistics | 32nd |
| Jack Chambers | 21 December 2022 | 26 June 2024 | Fianna Fáil | International and road transport and logistics | 33rd • 34th |
| James Lawless | 27 June 2024 | 23 January 2025 | Fianna Fáil | International and road transport and logistics | 34th |
| Seán Canney | 23 January 2025 | Incumbent | Independent | International and road transport, logistics, rail and ports | 35th |
| Jerry Buttimer | 29 January 2025 | Incumbent | Fine Gael | Rural transport | 35th |
