= Dún Laoghaire–Rathdown County Council =

Local authority Dún Laoghaire–Rathdown in Ireland

Dún Laoghaire–Rathdown County Council Comhairle Contae Dhún Laoghaire–Ráth an Dúin

Type
- Type: County council

History
- Founded: 1 January 1994

Leadership
- Cathaoirleach: Barry Saul, FG

Structure
- Seats: 40
- Political groups: Fine Gael (16) Green (6) Fianna Fáil (5) Labour (5) PBP–Solidarity (2) Social Democrats (1) Independent (5)

Elections
- Last election: 7 June 2024

Motto
- Irish: Ó Chuan go Sliabh "From Harbour to Mountain"

Meeting place
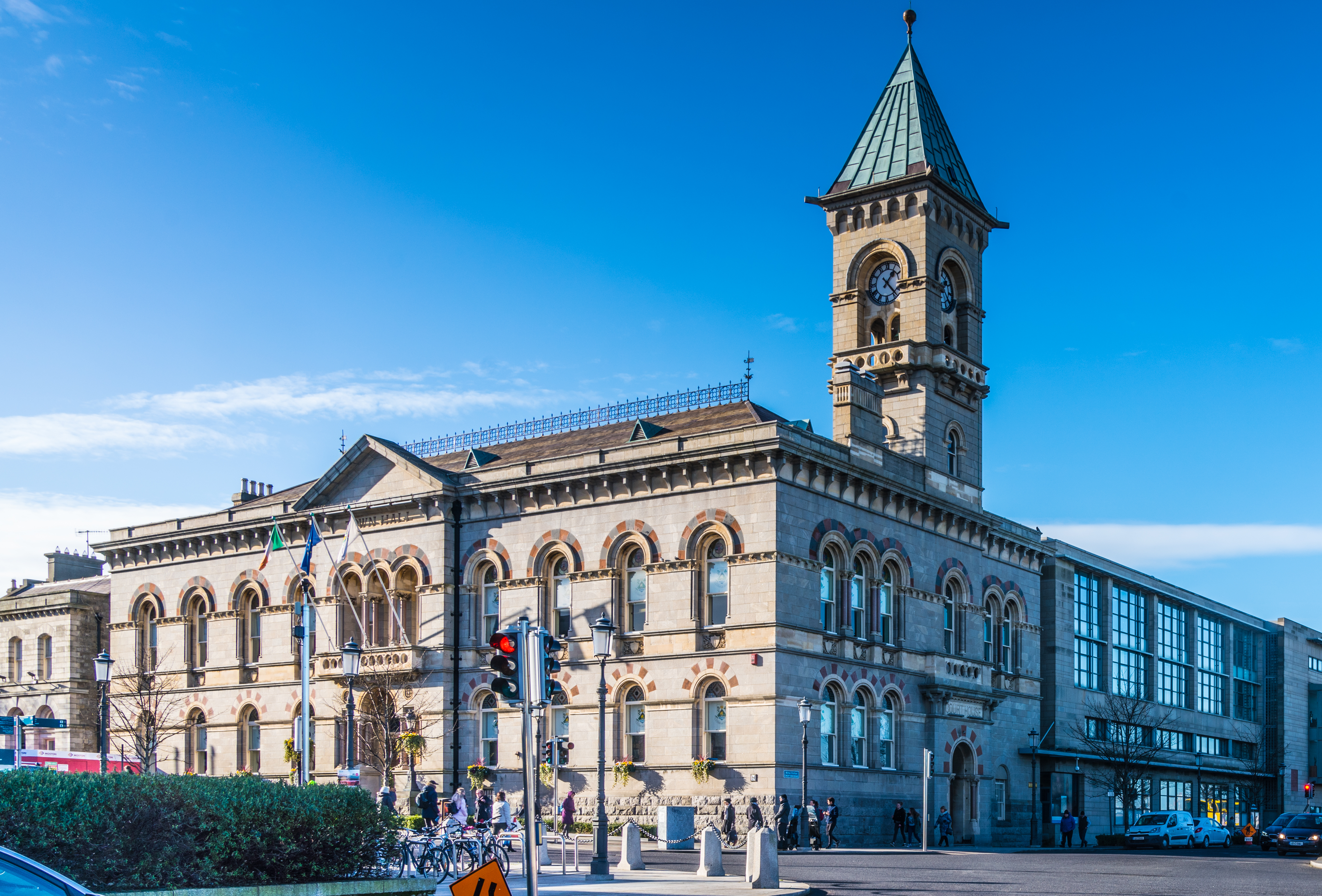
- County Hall, Dún Laoghaire

Website
- Official website

Location of Dun Laoghaire-Rathdown in Ireland

Dún Laoghaire–Rathdown County Council (Irish: Comhairle Contae Dhún Laoghaire–Ráth an Dúin) is the local authority of the county of Dún Laoghaire–Rathdown, Ireland. It is one of three local authorities that succeeded the former Dublin County Council on its abolition on 1 January 1994 and one of four councils in the old County Dublin. As a county council, it is governed by the Local Government Act 2001. The council is responsible for housing and community, roads and transportation, urban planning and development, amenity and culture, and environment. The council has 40 elected members. Elections are held every five years and are by single transferable vote. The head of the council has the title of Cathaoirleach (chairperson). The county administration is headed by a chief executive, Frank Curran. The county town is Dún Laoghaire. It serves a population of approximately 206,260.

== History ==
The council of the electoral county of Dún Laoghaire–Rathdown was established in 1985 with 28 members. Its members also sat as members of Dublin County Council and members from three electoral areas were also the members of Dún Laoghaire Corporation.

On 1 January 1994, under the Local Government (Dublin) Act 1993, County Dublin and the Borough of Dún Laoghaire ceased to exist with the new county of Dún Laoghaire–Rathdown succeeding in the area of the electoral county. Dublin County Council and Dún Laoghaire Corporation also ceased to exist and Dún Laoghaire–Rathdown County Council came into being.

The two sides of the county have distinct histories in terms of local government structures. On the Dún Laoghaire side of the county, the Borough of Dún Laoghaire had been established by the Local Government (Dublin) Act 1930 as a successor body to urban districts of Dún Laoghaire, Blackrock, Dalkey, and Killiney and Ballybrack. A Board of Town Commissioners for Kingstown had been established in 1834 and were subsequently renamed the Kingstown Urban District Council and then Dún Laoghaire Urban District Council. On the Rathdown side of the county, Rathdown No. 1 Rural District Council was established under the Local Government (Ireland) Act 1898. Rathdown No. 1 Rural District Council was abolished by the Local Government (Dublin) Act 1930.

On its formation, the Town Hall in Dún Laoghaire became the headquarters of Dún Laoghaire–Rathdown County Council. It was subsequently renamed County Hall.

The Local Government Act 2001 reformed the two-tier structure of local government. It confirmed the size of the council as 28 members. Under the Local Government Reform Act 2014, the size of the council was increased to 40 members as part of a nationwide reallocation of local authority membership numbers.

== Regional Assembly ==
Dún Laoghaire–Rathdown County Council has three representatives on the Eastern and Midland Regional Assembly who are part of the Dublin Strategic Planning Area Committee.

== Elections ==
Members of Dún Laoghaire–Rathdown County Council are elected for a five-year term of office on the electoral system of proportional representation by means of the single transferable vote (PR-STV) from multi-member local electoral areas (LEAs).

Year	FG	FF	GP	Lab	PBP–S	SD	SF	PDs	WP	Ind.	Total
2024	16	5	6	5	2	1	0	—N/a	0	5	40
2019	13	7	6	6	2	1	0	—N/a	0	5	40
2014	11	8	2	7	3	—N/a	3	—N/a	0	6	40
2009	11	4	0	8	2	—N/a	0	—N/a	0	3	28
2004	9	7	4	6	0	—N/a	0	1	0	1	28
1999	8	10	1	6	—N/a	—N/a	0	3	0	0	28
1991	7	8	3	5	—N/a	—N/a	0	2	3	0	28
1985	11	13	0	3	—N/a	—N/a	0	—N/a	1	0	28

== Local electoral areas ==
Dún Laoghaire–Rathdown is divided into seven local electoral areas, defined by electoral divisions. These are defined by electoral divisions which were defined in 1986, with minor amendments in 1994.

LEA	Definition	Seats
Blackrock	Blackrock-Booterstown, Blackrock-Carysfort, Blackrock-Central, Blackrock-Glenomena, Blackrock-Newpark, Blackrock-Seapoint, Blackrock-Templehill, Blackrock-Williamstown, Foxrock-Beechpark, Foxrock-Deansgrange, Stillorgan-Priory; and those parts of the electoral divisions of Blackrock-Monkstown and Blackrock-Stradbrook situated west of a line drawn along Stradbrook Road.	6
Dundrum	Ballinteer-Broadford, Ballinteer-Ludford, Ballinteer-Meadowbroads, Ballinteer-Meadowmount, Churchtown-Castle, Churchtown-Landscape, Churchtown-Nutgrove, Churchtown-Orwell, Churchtown-Woodlawn, Clonskeagh-Farranboley, Clonskeagh-Windy Arbour, Dundrum-Kilmacud, Dundrum-Sweetmount, Dundrum-Taney; that part of the electoral division of Ballinteer-Marley situated north of a line drawn along Grange Road;that part of the electoral division of Dundrum-Balally situated north of a line drawn along Blackthorn Drive;and that part of the electoral division of Dundrum-Sandyford situated north of a line drawn as follows: Commencing at the intersection, at the south-eastern corner of the electoral division of Ballinteer-Ludford, of the southern boundary of the electoral division of Ballinteer-Ludford and the western boundary of the electoral division of Dundrum-Sandyford; thence proceeding in an easterly direction along the southern boundary of the grounds of Gort Mhuire to the point where it meets Ballawley Park; thence commencing in an easterly direction and proceeding along the northern boundary of the said park to its intersection with the eastern boundary of the electoral division of Dundrum-Sandyford.	7
Dún Laoghaire	Cabinteely-Pottery, Dalkey-Bullock, Dalkey-Coliemore, Dalkey Hill, Dalkey Upper, Dun Laoghaire-East Central, Dun Laoghaire-Glasthule, Dun Laoghaire-Glenageary, Dun Laoghaire-Monkstown Farm, Dun Laoghaire-Mount Town, Dun Laoghaire-Sallynoggin East, Dun Laoghaire-Sallynoggin South, Dun Laoghaire-Sallynoggin West, Dun Laoghaire-Salthill, Dun Laoghaire-Sandycove, Dun Laoghaire-West Central; and those parts of the electoral divisions of Blackrock-Monkstown and Blackrock-Stradbrook not contained in the local electoral area of Blackrock.	7
Glencullen–Sandyford	Ballinteer-Woodpark, Glencullen, Tibradden; and those parts of the electoral divisions of Ballinteer-Marley, Dundrum-Balally and Dundrum-Sandyford not contained in the local electoral area of Dundrum.	7
Killiney–Shankill	Ballybrack, Cabinteely-Granitefield, Cabinteely-Kilbogget, Cabinteely-Loughlinstown, Dalkey-Avondale, Killiney North, Killiney South, Shankill-Rathmichael, Shankill-Rathsallagh and Shankill-Shanganagh.	7
Stillorgan	Clonskeagh-Belfield, Clonskeagh-Milltown, Clonskeagh-Roebuck, Foxrock-Carrickmines, Foxrock-Torquay, Stillorgan-Deerpark, Stillorgan-Kilmacud, Stillorgan-Leopardstown, Stillorgan-Merville and Stillorgan-Mount Merrion.	6

== Councillors ==
=== 2024 seats summary ===
Party	Seats
Fine Gael	16
Green	6
Fianna Fáil	5
Labour	5
PBP–Solidarity	2
Social Democrats	1
Independent	5

=== Councillors by electoral area ===
This list reflects the order in which councillors were elected on 7 June 2024.

Council members from 2024 election
Local electoral area	Name	Party
Blackrock	Marie Baker	Fine Gael
Blackrock	Michael Clark	Fianna Fáil
Blackrock	Conor Dowling	Green
Blackrock	Maurice Dockrell	Fine Gael
Blackrock	Martha Fanning	Labour
Blackrock	Dan Carson	Fine Gael
Dundrum	Seán McLoughlin	Independent
Dundrum	Jim O'Leary	Fine Gael
Dundrum	Shay Brennan (Note: Replaced during term, see table below for details.)	Fianna Fáil
Dundrum	Peter O'Brien	Labour
Dundrum	Anna Grainger	Fine Gael
Dundrum	Robert Jones	Green
Dundrum	Anne Colgan	Independent
Dún Laoghaire	Lorraine Hall	Fine Gael
Dún Laoghaire	Tom Kivlehan	Green
Dún Laoghaire	Melisa Halpin	PBP–Solidarity
Dún Laoghaire	J. P. Durkan	Fine Gael
Dún Laoghaire	Mary Fayne	Fine Gael
Dún Laoghaire	Justin Moylan	Fianna Fáil
Dún Laoghaire	Thomas Joseph	Labour
Glencullen–Sandyford	Michael Fleming	Independent
Glencullen–Sandyford	Lettie McCarthy	Labour
Glencullen–Sandyford	Oisín O'Connor	Green
Glencullen–Sandyford	Pierce Dargan	Fine Gael
Glencullen–Sandyford	Kazi Ahmed	Fine Gael
Glencullen–Sandyford	Tom Murphy	Fianna Fáil
Glencullen–Sandyford	Kevin Daly	Independent
Killiney–Shankill	Carrie Smyth	Labour
Killiney–Shankill	Jim Gildea	Fine Gael
Killiney–Shankill	Frank McNamara	Fine Gael
Killiney–Shankill	Hugh Lewis	Independent
Killiney–Shankill	Jacqueline Burke	Fine Gael
Killiney–Shankill	Lauren Tuite	Green
Killiney–Shankill	Dave O'Keeffe	PBP–Solidarity
Stillorgan	Barry Saul	Fine Gael
Stillorgan	Maeve O'Connell	Fine Gael
Stillorgan	John Kennedy	Fine Gael
Stillorgan	Liam Dockery	Fianna Fáil
Stillorgan	Eva Elizabeth Dowling	Green
Stillorgan	John Hurley	Social Democrats

==== Co-options ====
Party	Outgoing	LEA	Reason	Date	Co-optee
Fianna Fáil	Shay Brennan	Dundrum	Elected to 34th Dáil at the 2024 general election	14 January 2025	Fiona Murray
Fine Gael	Maeve O'Connell	Stillorgan	Elected to 34th Dáil at the 2024 general election	3 January 2025	Eoin O'Driscoll

== Controversies ==
=== M50 and compensation to Jackson Way Properties ===
An agreement was reached for Dún Laoghaire–Rathdown County Council to compensate Jackson Way Properties by €12,860,700 for the compulsory purchase in October 1998 of its freehold interest in the lands, adjoining the M50 motorway. The Council agreed to pay costs and expenses properly incurred by Jackson Way Properties in relation to preparation and submission of its claim.

The 2003 award total is broken down as follows:

- Land taken – €9,691,000
- Injurious affection – €2,296,700 and
- Disturbance – €873,000.

It had been the view of the Criminal Assets Bureau (CAB) that €4.2 million of this award represents the present value of corrupt enrichment by the property owners although this view is based on hearsay evidence given by Frank Dunlop. A company called Paisley Park Investments Ltd were registered as full owners in 1992 and the land was transferred to Jackson Way Properties in 1993, the beneficial owners of which are believed by CAB to be arcade owner James Kennedy and solicitor John Coldwell. However, in January 2014 the freezing order was lifted owing to the collapse of the associated political corruption trial involving Dún Laoghaire Rathdown County Council Cathaoirleach Tony Fox; damages were subsequently sought against CAB by Jackson Way.

In 2016, the Office of the Information Commissioner found against the council for refusing to comply a request under the Freedom of Information Act relating to the case, stating as follows, "I find it very difficult to accept that the Council holds no records coming within the scope of the request that cannot be released to the applicant under the FOI Act. It seems to me that the Council adopted a blanket approach to the request by claiming that the exemptions applied to all records coming within the scope of the request and did not conduct a record by record examination."

=== Criminal Assets Bureau investigation ===
The Criminal Assets Bureau (CAB) successfully obtained a High Court order on 26 July 2006 freezing land assets of 107 acres (0.43 km^{2}) at Carrickmines, County Dublin, owned by Jackson Way Properties Ltd and preventing their sale. CAB contended that these lands had been rezoned on 16 December 1997 by Dún Laoghaire–Rathdown County Council from agricultural to industrial use after Frank Dunlop bribed and made corrupt payments to councillors to secure their support in the rezoning vote. That vote increased the value of just 17 acres (69,000 m^{2}) of the property from €8 million to €61 million. CAB has interviewed and taken statements from Dunlop and will use him as a witness against a number of property developers; Dunlop served a jail sentence for corruption in Arbour Hill from May 2009 to July 2010.

The lands in question have been the subject of investigation by the Mahon Tribunal in 2003 and 2004.

Criminal Assets Bureau v. Jackson Way Properties was due for hearing in the High Court Dublin in October 2010, which was vigorously defended with Jackson Way denying any wrongdoing and Mr Kennedy a tax exile currently living in Gibraltar returning to give evidence in the case. Jackson Way gave the court notice that they intend to subpoena councillors to give evidence. No Dún Laoghaire-Rathdown representative to date has been charged with any form of wrongdoing in relation to rezoning, likely because in January 2014 the freezing order was lifted owing to the collapse of a political corruption trial involving Frank Dunlop and Jacksonway's subsequent legal proceedings against CAB.

== Revenue generation ==
There have been complaints about the council's policies regarding commercial rates and parking charges and also complaints from business owners in the town about the way in which the Council enforces the collection of parking charges and fines. Dún Laoghaire-Rathdown local authority area has the second highest level of revenue generation of local authorities in the state after Dublin City.
