= Joe O'Brien (politician) =

Irish former politician

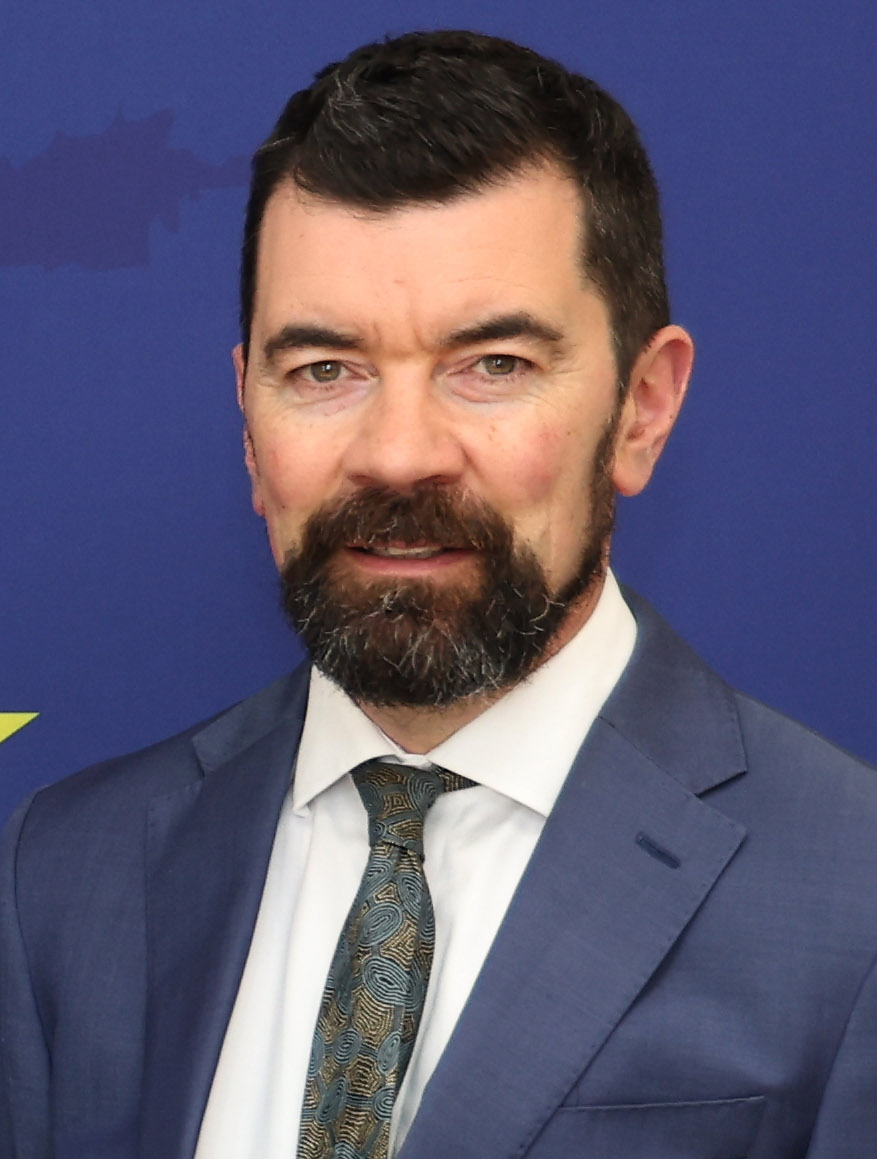
- O'Brien in 2025

Minister of State
- 2022–2025: Children, Equality, Disability, Integration and Youth
- 2020–2025: Social Protection
- 2020–2025: Rural and Community Development

Teachta Dála
- In office November 2019 – November 2024
- Constituency: Dublin Fingal

Personal details
- Born: 1976/1977 (age 48–49) Cork, Ireland
- Party: Green Party
- Children: 3
- Education: University College Cork
- Website: joefingalgreen.com

Joe O'Brien (born 1976/1977) is an Irish former Green Party politician who served as a Minister of State from July 2020 to January 2025. He was a Teachta Dála (TD) for the Dublin Fingal constituency from 2019 to 2024. He was appointed executive director of the Irish Council for Civil Liberties in 2025.

== Background ==
O'Brien was born in Cork and grew up in Grenagh, County Cork. He attended the North Monastery secondary school. O'Brien graduated from University College Cork with a degree in French and Economics. After his studies, he moved to Dublin, where he became an advocate for inclusion and migrant rights. He has worked for the Immigrant Council of Ireland as well as Crosscare, which is one of the largest providers of services to the homeless in Dublin city. O'Brien lives in Skerries with his wife and three children.

As an observer with the Ecumenical Accompaniment Programme in Palestine and Israel (EAPPI), an international programme coordinated by the World Council of Churches, O'Brien worked in the Bethlehem area for three months in 2009. In this role, he monitored checkpoints of the Israeli Defence Forces and supported local Palestinian and Israeli peace groups. In a submission to the Oireachtas Joint Committee On Foreign Affairs And Trade in 2012, he set out the EAPPI's position in advocating a ban on the sale of Israeli products produced in the Occupied Palestinian Territories.

In January 2016 he acted as a whistleblower on the apparent under-reporting of homelessness figures. A report compiled by O'Brien suggested the actual level of homelessness may have been more than 50% greater than the official figures.

== Political career ==
O'Brien was a member of Fingal County Council from May 2019 to November 2019, representing the Balbriggan local electoral area.

He was elected to the Dáil in a by-election in November 2019. In December 2019, he won a discrimination case at the Workplace Relations Commission against Irish Rail over its failure to maintain working lifts at train stations in Balbriggan and Skerries.

He retained his seat in the 2020 general election. During the 2020 election campaign, O'Brien was listed (among other candidates) as a supporter of the Oireachtas Committee on Health's recommendations to address foetal anti-convulsant syndrome, of the Ireland Palestine Solidarity Campaign's proposal to prohibit the import of goods from "illegal settlements in Palestine" and to the right to free speech and non-violent activism, and of The Wheel's "Stronger Communities, Stronger Ireland" manifesto for charities and voluntary organisations.

In June 2020, during a speech in the Dáil, he stated that some politicians had used racism to get elected in Ireland.

Following the formation of a coalition government in late June 2020, O'Brien was appointed as Department of Rural and Community Development and at the Department of Social Protection with special responsibility for Community Development and Charities.

In July 2020, O'Brien abstained from voting for the Government's Residential Tenancies and Valuation Bill, and was sanctioned by Green Party leader Eamon Ryan by having his speaking rights withdrawn for two months.

During 2021 and 2022, he called for a €50 increase in core social welfare payments and a €10 increase in weekly social welfare payments.

In December 2022, he was re-appointed to the same position, as well as Minister of State at the Department of Children, Equality, Disability, Integration and Youth with special responsibility for Integration following the appointment of Leo Varadkar as Taoiseach.

In January 2024, he stated that Ireland should join the South Africa v. Israel (Genocide Convention) case at the International Court of Justice (ICJ), and in March 2024 he called for UNRWA funding to be reinstated by countries who had paused funding and suggested that Israel would only respond to international demands on international law if there was an economic consequence.

He lost his seat at the 2024 general election. In April 2025, he was appointed as executive director of the Irish Council for Civil Liberties.

Political offices
Preceded by Seán Canney	Minister of State at the Department of Rural and Community Development; 2020–2025	Succeeded by Jerry Buttimer as Minister of State at the Department of Rural and Community Development and the Gaeltacht
New office	Minister of State at the Department of Social Protection; 2020–2025	Succeeded by Office abolished
New office	Minister of State at the Department of Children, Equality, Disability, Integration and Youth; 2022–2025	Succeeded by Colm Brophy as Minister of State at the Department of Justice, Home Affairs and Migration

Dáil	Election	Deputy (Party)	Deputy (Party)	Deputy (Party)	Deputy (Party)	Deputy (Party)
32nd	2016	Louise O'Reilly (SF)	Clare Daly (I4C)	Brendan Ryan (Lab)	Darragh O'Brien (FF)	Alan Farrell (FG)
32nd	2019 by-election	Louise O'Reilly (SF)	Joe O'Brien (GP)	Brendan Ryan (Lab)	Darragh O'Brien (FF)	Alan Farrell (FG)
33rd	2020	Louise O'Reilly (SF)	Joe O'Brien (GP)	Duncan Smith (Lab)	Darragh O'Brien (FF)	Alan Farrell (FG)
34th	2024	Constituency abolished. See Dublin Fingal East and Dublin Fingal West.				
