= Fine Gael Front Bench =

Irish political party group

Fine Gael is the third largest political party in the Oireachtas. The Fine Gael leader appoints a team of TDs and Senators to speak for the party on different issues. When Fine Gael was in opposition, the front bench areas of responsibility broadly corresponded to those of Government ministers. Fine Gael has been in Government since March 2011 and accordingly their front bench consists of the ministerial officeholders. In 2025 a number of non-ministerial office holders were appointed as spokespeople for policy areas where Fine Gael does not have a minister.

Fine Gael's current leader is Simon Harris. Helen McEntee is the current deputy leader, and Michael Carrigy is chair of the parliamentary party.

== Fine Gael ministers ==
On 23 January 2025, seven Fine Gael TDs were appointed to the 35th government of Ireland by Taoiseach Micheál Martin. Fine Gael TD Hildegarde Naughton was also appointed a minister of state in attendance at cabinet. On 29 January 2025, the government on the nomination of the Taoiseach appointed six further Fine Gael ministers of state. On 25 February 2025, Colm Brophy was also appointed minister of state.

Name	Elected office	Portfolio	Term
Simon Harris	TD for Wicklow	Leader of Fine Gael; Tánaiste; Minister for Finance	2024– 2025–
Helen McEntee	TD for Meath East	Deputy leader of Fine Gael; Minister for Education and Youth	2024–; 2025–
Peter Burke	TD for Longford–Westmeath	Minister for Enterprise, Tourism and Employment	2025–
Patrick O'Donovan	TD for Limerick County	Minister for Culture, Communications and Sport	2025–
Jennifer Carroll MacNeill	TD for Dún Laoghaire	Minister for Health	2025–
Martin Heydon	TD for Kildare South	Minister for Agriculture, Food and the Marine	2025–
Hildegarde Naughton	TD for Galway West	Minister of State for Disability	2025–
Emer Higgins	TD for Dublin Mid-West	Minister of State for Public Procurement, Digitalisation and eGovernment	2025–
Neale Richmond	TD for Dublin Rathdown	Minister of State for International Development and Diaspora	2025–
Jerry Buttimer	TD for Cork South-Central	Minister of State for Community Development, Charities, Gaeltacht and the Islands; Minister of State for Rural Transport	2025–
John Cummins	TD for Waterford	Minister of State for Local Government and Planning	2025–
Kieran O'Donnell	TD for Limerick City	Minister of State for Older People; Minister of State for Housing	2025–
Alan Dillon	TD for Mayo	Minister of State for the Circular Economy; Minister of State for Small Businesses and Retail	2025–
Colm Brophy	TD for Dublin South-West	Minister of State for Migration	2025–

== Fine Gael party spokespeople ==
In 2025 a number of non-ministerial office holders were appointed as spokespeople for policy areas where Fine Gael does not have a minister.

Name	Elected Office	Portfolio	Term
Maeve O'Connell	TD for Dublin Rathdown	Spokesperson for Further and Higher Education, Research, Innovation and Science	2025–
Peter Roche	TD for Galway East	Spokesperson for Mental Health	2025–
James Geoghegan	TD for Dublin South-West	Spokesperson for Dublin	2025–
Emer Currie	TD for Dublin West	Spokesperson for Childcare; Deputy Government Whip	2025–
John Clendennen	TD for Offaly	Assistant whip	2025–
