= 2014 Dún Laoghaire–Rathdown County Council election =

Part of the 2014 Irish local elections

- 23 May 2014

All 40 seats on Dún Laoghaire–Rathdown County Council 21 seats needed for a majority
	First party	Second party	Third party
Party	Fine Gael	Fianna Fáil	Labour
Seats won	11	8	7
Seat change	0	+4	-1
	Fourth party	Fifth party	Sixth party
Party	Sinn Féin	People Before Profit	Green
Seats won	3	3	2
Seat change	+3	+1	+2
	Seventh party
Party	Independent
Seats won	6
Seat change	+3
- Map showing the area of Dún Laoghaire–Rathdown County Council
Council control before election
Fine Gael
Council control after election
Fine Gael

An election to all 40 seats on Dún Laoghaire–Rathdown County Council was held on 23 May 2014 as part of the 2014 Irish local elections, an increase from 28 at the previous election. Dún Laoghaire–Rathdown was divided into six local electoral areas (LEAs) to elect councillors from a field of 85 candidates for a five-year term of office on the electoral system of proportional representation by means of the single transferable vote (PR-STV).

Fine Gael retained their position as the leading party on the authority with 11 seats, including 2 seats in each of Blackrock, Dundrum and Stillorgan and 3 seats in Dún Laoghaire. Fianna Fáil doubled their seats to 8 and won 2 seats in each of Blackrock and Stillorgan. Labour lost 1 seat overall to emerge with 7 seats. The party won 2 seats in each of Glencullen–Sandyford and Killiney–Shankill to compensate from losing a seat in Dún Laoghaire. Sinn Féin gained 3 seats to secure representation on the council for the first time. People Before Profit gained 2 extra seats to also return with 3 councillors. The Green Party also returned with 2 seats with 2 gains in Dundrum and Dún Laoghaire. Independents doubled their seats to return with 6 seats to the Council chamber.

== Results by party ==
Party	Seats	±	1st pref	FPv%
Fine Gael	11	0	19,518	28.15
Fianna Fáil	8	+4	12,936	18.66
Labour	7	−1	9,108	13.14
Sinn Féin	3	+3	6,690	9.65
People Before Profit	3	+1	5,475	7.90
Green	2	+2	4,829	6.97
Independent	6	+3	10,774	15.54
Total	40	+12	69,330	100.00

== Results by local electoral area ==
*: Outgoing councillor.

=== Blackrock ===
Blackrock: 6 seats
Party	Candidate	FPv%	Count					
Party	Candidate	FPv%	1	2	3	4	5	6
Fine Gael	Marie Baker	17.29	1,797					
Fianna Fáil	Mary Hanafin	14.45	1,501					
Fianna Fáil	Kate Feeney	12.40	1,288	1,322	1,367	1,432	1,521	
Independent	Victor Boyhan††††	11.27	1,171	1,202	1,272	1,421	1,502	
Fine Gael	Barry Ward	11.06	1,149	1,247	1,272	1,341	1,830	
People Before Profit	Lola Hynes	8.09	841	848	1,034	1,201	1,238	1,264
Fine Gael	Maurice Dockrell	6.78	704	795	822	863		
Green	Celine Moorkens	6.52	677	691	754			
Labour	Deirdre Kingston	6.17	641	664	815	992	1,077	1,335
Sinn Féin	Brian McNally	3.64	378	380				
Labour	Angela Timlin	2.35	244	256				
Electorate: 22,712 Valid: 10,391 (45.75%) Spoilt: 83 Quota: 1,485 Turnout: 10,474 (46.12%)

=== Dundrum ===
Dundrum: 7 seats
Party	Candidate	FPv%	Count											
Party	Candidate	FPv%	1	2	3	4	5	6	7	8	9	10	11	12
Sinn Féin	Sorcha Nic Cormaic	8.68	1,161	1,165	1,167	1,184	1,217	1,228	1,351	1,381	1,413	1,420	1,431	1,571
Fianna Fáil	Shay Brennan	8.84	1,130	1,144	1,152	1,173	1,322	1,339	1,348	1,385	1,743			
Green	Catherine Martin†	7.98	1,068	1,078	1,099	1,160	1,182	1,237	1,289	1,346	1,409	1,423	1,502	1,602
Fine Gael	Brian Murphy†††††††††	7.84	1,049	1,059	1,147	1,183	1,221	1,283	1,295	1,343	1,409	1,414	1,678	
Independent	Seamus O'Neill	7.50	1,004	1,027	1,038	1,089	1,109	1,130	1,221	1,400	1,445	1,451	1,499	1,630
Labour	Grace Tallon	6.79	908	922	975	1,002	1,012	1,241	1,293	1,356	1,447	1,455	1,584	1,683
Fine Gael	Pat Hand	6.55	877	883	933	957	982	1,029	1,037	1,054	1,081	1,085	1,339	1,422
Independent	Anne Colgan	5.73	767	786	801	878	907	934	996	1,095	1,133	1,141	1,184	1,392
Fine Gael	Jim O'Dea	5.50	736	743	821	841	866	901	906	935	976	981		
Independent	Tony Fox	5.43	726	748	752	796	825	836	887	941	979	992	1,045	
Fianna Fáil	Sarah Ryan	5.13	686	689	700	721	808	825	837	865				
Independent	Stephen O'Shea	4.32	578	593	596	632	650	659	722					
People Before Profit	John O'Dowd	4.13	553	557	558	597	613	626						
Fianna Fáil	Tony Kelly	4.03	539	542	544	548								
Labour	Peter Leonard	3.98	532	536	551	564	576							
Independent	Terence Corish	3.71	497	518	523									
Fine Gael	Madeline Spiers	2.83	379	381										
Independent	Donal Fingleton	1.43	192											
Electorate: 28,094 Valid: 13,382 (47.63%) Spoilt: 160 Quota: 1,673 Turnout: 13,542 (48.20%)

=== Dún Laoghaire ===
Dún Laoghaire: 8 seats
Party	Candidate	FPv%	Count														
Party	Candidate	FPv%	1	2	3	4	5	6	7	8	9	10	11	12	13	14	15
Fine Gael	John Bailey	16.19	2,423														
Fianna Fáil	Cormac Devlin	8.37	1,253	1,341	1,346	1,349	1,361	1,368	1,390	1,404	1,423	1,578	1,624	1,671			
People Before Profit	Melissa Halpin	8.00	1,198	1,210	1,214	1,219	1,226	1,235	1,256	1,275	1,311	1,348	1,412	1,436	1,436	1,670	
Green	Ossian Smyth	7.14	1,068	1,096	1,107	1,117	1,128	1,133	1,148	1,212	1,256	1,314	1,403	1,473	1,474	1,534	1,656
People Before Profit	Karl Gill††††††††	6.93	1,037	1,066	1,070	1,071	1,079	1,087	1,105	1,112	1,124	1,153	1,216	1,233	1,233	1,489	1,659
Sinn Féin	Jeanette Kavanagh	6.10	913	923	927	930	932	932	938	945	956	972	1,003	1,012	1,012		
Fine Gael	Patricia Stewart	5.06	757	851	852	854	863	865	874	944	981	1,012	1,046	1,321	1,321	1,330	1,377
Fianna Fáil	James McCann	4.72	707	736	736	741	748	754	769	772	791	941	991	1,015	1,017	1,086	
Labour	Jane Dillon-Byrne	4.66	697	787	790	793	875	876	886	1,093	1,111	1,137	1,162	1,207	1,208	1,244	1,319
Fine Gael	Mary Fayne	4.52	677	866	866	868	876	880	893	940	975	998	1,020	1,227	1,230	1,248	1,337
Independent	Michael Merrigan	4.45	666	674	682	693	701	731	765	782	903	936	1,113	1,140	1,140	1,251	1,352
Fianna Fáil	Lisa Rogerson	4.01	600	631	631	631	638	646	656	671	696						
Fine Gael	Ellen O'Connor	3.93	588	659	662	663	671	678	694	726	766	802	835				
Independent	John Paul Kearney	3.59	537	556	557	573	578	608	662	673	749	774					
Labour	Donna Pierce	3.09	462	483	484	485	547	549	556								
Independent	Rita O'Brien	2.33	349	355	418	446	453	583	638	646							
Independent	Mary MacHale	1.94	291	300	303	310	313	342									
Labour	John Kane	1.64	246	261	261	263											
Independent	Peter Kerrigan	1.40	210	214	233	294	296										
Independent	Anthony Kenny	1.01	151	154	163												
Independent	Alan O'Reilly	0.92	138	141													
Electorate: 32,795 Valid: 14,968 (45.64%) Spoilt: 181 Quota: 1,664 Turnout: 15,149 (46.19%)

=== Glencullen–Sandyford ===
Glencullen–Sandyford: 7 seats
Party	Candidate	FPv%	Count									
Party	Candidate	FPv%	1	2	3	4	5	6	7	8	9	10
Labour	Lettie McCarthy	17.65	1,577									
Fine Gael	Neale Richmond†††††	13.07	1,168									
Sinn Féin	Chris Curran	10.75	961	976	981	985	1,019	1,020	1,043	1,045	1,246	
Independent	Kevin Daly	8.87	793	836	838	856	891	894	943	944	1,080	1,132
Fianna Fáil	Tom Murphy	7.91	707	761	772	802	1,062	1,066	1,140			
Labour	Peter O'Brien	7.21	644	790	815	846	879	886	1,009	1,015	1,087	1,104
People Before Profit	Nicola Curry	6.76	604	621	626	637	665	666	726	729		
Independent	Lynsey McGovern†††††††††	6.15	550	583	606	620	650	655	748	751	929	984
Green	Tom Kivlehan	5.77	516	548	558	580	600	604				
Fianna Fáil	John Byrne	5.38	481	500	508	516						
Fine Gael	Tom Joyce	4.53	405	443	517	747	777	802	875	882	902	906
Fine Gael	Aileen Eglington	3.63	324	361	408							
Fine Gael	Stewart Stephens	2.31	206	231								
Electorate: 22,226 Valid: 8,936 (40.21%) Spoilt: 94 Quota: 1,118 Turnout: 9,030 (40.63%)

=== Killiney–Shankill ===
Killiney–Shankill: 6 seats
Party	Candidate	FPv%	Count									
Party	Candidate	FPv%	1	2	3	4	5	6	7	8	9	10
People Before Profit	Hugh Lewis	14.03	1,653	1,663	1,758							
Sinn Féin	Shane O'Brien	12.77	1,504	1,516	1,541	1,582	1,588	1,600	1,602	1,672	1,672	1,674
Fianna Fáil	Jennifer Cuffe	10.92	1,286	1,329	1,366	1,616	1,620	1,708				
Labour	Carrie Smyth	10.36	1,220	1,251	1,271	1,303	1,305	1,409	1,443	1,718		
Fine Gael	Maria Bailey††	9.23	1,087	1,223	1,252	1,294	1,296	1,789				
Labour	Denis O'Callaghan	8.22	968	995	1,024	1,068	1,072	1,178	1,219	1,405	1,434	1,450
People Before Profit	Cillian Doyle	7.73	911	928	1,011	1,048	1,098	1,124	1,130	1,417	1,422	1,428
Green	Cara Augustenborg	7.27	857	888	963	998	1,003	1,066	1,088			
Fine Gael	Jim Gildea	6.46	761	895	920	942	943					
Fianna Fáil	Vinny Duran-Kearns	4.76	561	566	583							
Independent	Simon Hall	4.13	487	508								
Fine Gael	Garrett McDermott	4.13	486									
Electorate: 26,266 Valid: 11,781 (44.85%) Spoilt: 134 Quota: 1,684 Turnout: 11,915 (45.36%)

=== Stillorgan ===
Stillorgan: 6 seats
Party	Candidate	FPv%	Count						
Party	Candidate	FPv%	1	2	3	4	5	6	7
Fine Gael	Barry Saul	21.83	2,155						
Fine Gael	Josepha Madigan†††	13.68	1,350	1,716					
Fianna Fáil	Gerry Horkan††††††	11.31	1,117	1,185	1,212	1,232	1,304	1,323	1,405
Independent	Deirdre Donnelly	11.16	1,102	1,155	1,172	1,323	1,620		
Fianna Fáil	Liam Dockery	10.94	1,080	1,112	1,131	1,163	1,200	1,210	1,277
Labour	Richard Humphreys†††††††	9.82	969	1,036	1,057	1,091	1,162	1,186	1,536
Green	Miriam Hennessy	6.51	643	666	678	736	806	893	1,004
Independent	Catriona Lawlor	5.72	565	595	606	689			
Sinn Féin	Simon Gillespie	4.57	451	460	461				
Fine Gael	John Kennedy	4.46	440	536	733	748	802	823	
Electorate: 21,417 Valid: 9,872 (46.09%) Spoilt: 88 Quota: 1,411 Turnout: 9,960 (46.51%)

== Changes ==
=== Co-options ===
Party	Outgoing	LEA	Reason	Date	Co-optee
Labour	Richard Humphreys	Stillorgan	Was appointed as a High Court Judge.	23 July 2015	Carron McKinney
Green	Catherine Martin	Dundrum	Elected to the 32nd Dáil at the 2016 general election.	26 February 2016	Karen Furlong
Fine Gael	Maria Bailey	Killiney–Shankill	Elected to the 32nd Dáil at the 2016 general election.	26 February 2016	Jim Gildea
Fine Gael	Josepha Madigan	Stillorgan	Elected to the 32nd Dáil at the 2016 general election.	26 February 2016	John Kennedy
Independent	Victor Boyhan	Blackrock	Elected to 25th Seanad at the 2016 Seanad election.	26 April 2016	Anne Colgan
Fine Gael	Neale Richmond	Glencullen–Sandyford	Elected to 25th Seanad at the 2016 Seanad election.	3rd June 2016	Emma Blain
Fianna Fáil	Gerry Horkan	Stillorgan	Elected to 25th Seanad at the 2016 Seanad election.	26 April 2016	Donal Smith
People Before Profit	Karl Gill	Dún Laoghaire	Resignation.	10 October 2016	Dave O'Keeffe
Labour	Carron McKinney	Stillorgan	Work commitiments in the UK.	3 May 2017	Alex White
Green	Karen Furlong	Dundrum	Resignation.	8 October 2018	Daniel Dunne

=== Changes in affiliation ===
Name	LEA	Elected as	New affiliation	Date
Lynsey McGovern	Glencullen–Sandyford	Independent	Fine Gael	25 October 2017
Brian Murphy	Dundrum	Fine Gael	Independent	30 October 2017
