= Minister of State at the Department of Rural and Community Development and the Gaeltacht =

List of Irish ministers of state

The minister of state at the Department of Rural and Community Development and the Gaeltacht (Irish: An tAire Stáit sa Roinn Forbartha Tuaithe, Pobail agus Gaeltachta) is a junior ministerial post in the Department of Rural and Community Development and the Gaeltacht of the Government of Ireland who performs duties and functions delegated by the minister for rural and community development and the Gaeltacht. A minister of state does not hold cabinet rank.

As of January 2025, the minister of state is Jerry Buttimer, TD, with responsibility for community development, charities, Gaeltacht and the islands.

== List of ministers of state ==
=== Department of Rural and Community Development 2017–2025 ===
Name	Term of office		Party	Responsibilities	Government
Seán Kyne	20 June 2017	16 October 2018	Fine Gael	Community	31st
Seán Canney	16 October 2018	27 June 2020	Independent	Community	31st
Joe O'Brien	1 July 2020	23 January 2025	Green	Community Development and Charities	32nd • 33rd • 34th
=== Department of Rural and Community Development and the Gaeltacht 2025–present ===
Name	Term of office		Party	Responsibilities	Government
Jerry Buttimer	29 January 2025	Incumbent	Fine Gael	Community development, charities, Gaeltacht and the islands	35th
