= Social Democrats Front Bench (Ireland) =

Front bench of Irish political party

The Social Democrats are the fourth-largest political party in Dáil Éireann. The party leader appoints a team of TDs (members of parliament) and Senators to speak for the party on different issues. The Social Democrats have been in opposition since their foundation in 2015 and accordingly, their front bench areas of responsibility broadly correspond to those of Government ministers. The current front bench was announced on 2 February 2025.

== Social Democrats frontbench ==
Portfolio	Name	Elected office
Leader of the Social Democrats	Holly Cairns	TD for Cork South-West
Deputy Leader of the Social Democrats; Spokesperson for Finance; Spokesperson for Public Expenditure, Infrastructure, Public Service Reform and Digitalisation	Cian O'Callaghan	TD for Dublin Bay North
Spokesperson for Youth Spokesperson for Transport	Aidan Farrelly	TD for Kildare North
Spokesperson for Justice, Home Affairs and Migration	Gary Gannon	TD for Dublin Central
Spokesperson for Education; Spokesperson for Further and Higher Education, Research, Innovation and Science	Jen Cummins	TD for Dublin South-Central
Spokesperson for Climate, Environment and Energy; Spokesperson for Agriculture, Food and the Marine	Jennifer Whitmore	TD for Wicklow
Spokesperson for Mental Health; Spokesperson for Rural and Community Development and the Gaeltacht; Spokesperson for Disability	Liam Quaide	TD for Cork East
Spokesperson for Health	Pádraig Rice	TD for Cork South-Central
Spokesperson for Housing, Local Government and Heritage	Rory Hearne	TD for Dublin North-West
Spokesperson for Enterprise, Tourism and Employment; Spokesperson for Defence; Spokesperson for Arts, Media, Communications, Culture and Sport	Sinéad Gibney	TD for Dublin Rathdown
Spokesperson for Foreign Affairs and Trade	Patricia Stephenson	Senator for the Labour Panel
Spokesperson for Social Protection	Eoin Hayes	TD for Dublin Bay South
Spokesperson for Children and Equality; Spokesperson for Sport	Daniel Ennis	TD for Dublin Central
