= Jerry Buttimer =

Irish politician (born 1967)

Jerry Buttimer TD
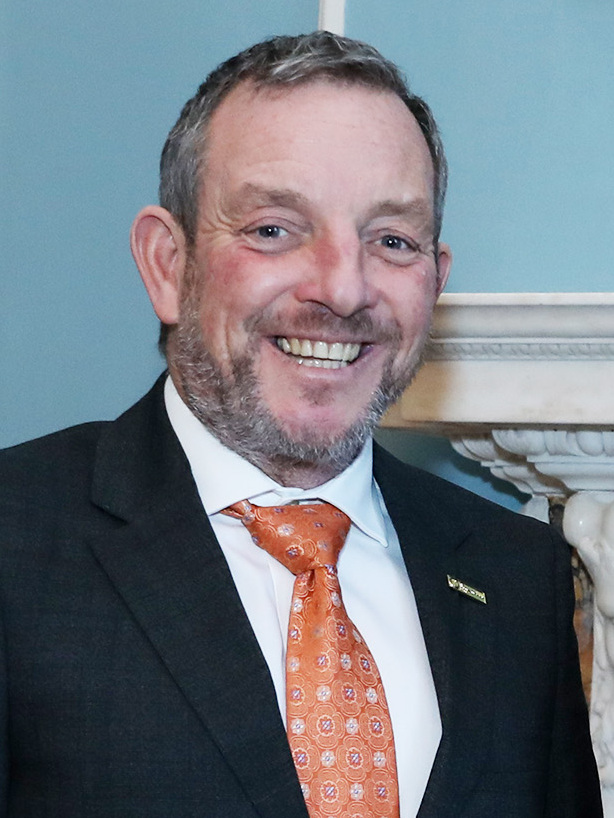
- Buttimer in 2022

Minister of State
- 2025–: Rural and Community Development and the Gaeltacht
- 2025–: Transport

Teachta Dála
- Incumbent
- Assumed office November 2024
- In office February 2011 – February 2016
- Constituency: Cork South-Central

Cathaoirleach of Seanad Éireann
- In office 16 December 2022 – 30 November 2024
- Deputy: Mark Daly
- Preceded by: Mark Daly
- Succeeded by: Mark Daly

Leas-Chathaoirleach of Seanad Éireann
- In office 7 July 2020 – 21 August 2020
- Cathaoirleach: Mark Daly
- Preceded by: Paul Coghlan
- Succeeded by: Joe O'Reilly

Leader of the Seanad
- In office 8 June 2016 – 27 June 2020
- Taoiseach: Enda Kenny; Leo Varadkar
- Deputy: Catherine Noone
- Preceded by: Maurice Cummins
- Succeeded by: Regina Doherty

Leader of Fine Gael in the Seanad
- In office 8 June 2016 – 27 June 2020
- Leader: Enda Kenny; Leo Varadkar
- Preceded by: Maurice Cummins
- Succeeded by: Regina Doherty

Senator
- In office 8 June 2016 – 30 November 2024
- In office 13 September 2007 – 25 February 2011
- Constituency: Labour Panel

Personal details
- Born: 18 March 1967 (age 59) Cork, Ireland
- Party: Fine Gael
- Spouse: Conchobar Ó Laoghaire (m. 2017)
- Education: St Patrick's College, Maynooth; University College Cork
- Website: jerrybuttimer.ie

Jerry Buttimer (born 18 March 1967) is an Irish Fine Gael politician who has served as Minister of State at the Department of Rural and Community Development and the Gaeltacht since January 2025. He has been a Teachta Dála (TD) for the Cork South-Central constituency since the 2024 general election, and previously from 2011 to 2016. He previously served as a Senator for the Labour Panel from 2016 to 2024, and previously from 2007 to 2011, Cathaoirleach of Seanad Éireann from December 2022 to November 2024, Leas-Chathaoirleach of Seanad Éireann from July 2020 to August 2020, Leader of the Seanad from 2016 to 2020 and Leader of Fine Gael in the Seanad from 2016 to 2020.

== Early life and education ==
After early education in Cork, Buttimer studied for the priesthood for five years at St Patrick's College, Maynooth as a candidate for the Diocese of Cork and Ross before opting not to pursue the priesthood. He was a classmate of Fintan Monahan, Bishop of Killaloe. He left for further study and worked as a teacher in a secondary school and more latterly was Director of Adult Education at Ballincollig Community School.

== Political career ==
He was first elected to Cork City Council in 2004 and was an unsuccessful candidate at the 2007 general election for the Cork South-Central constituency, but was subsequently elected to the Seanad. He was Fine Gael Seanad spokesperson on Community, Rural and Gaeltacht Affairs in the 23rd Seanad.

He was critical of the 2012 boundary commission report, which transferred the areas of Bishopstown and Glasheen from the Cork South–Central constituency to Cork North-Central. Both areas were considered his political base in the constituency. Despite predictions that he would move to Cork North-Central at the next election, he announced in August 2012 that he would contest the next election in Cork South-Central.

He lost his seat at the 2016 general election. After his election as a member of Seanad Éireann in April 2016, he was appointed by the Taoiseach as Leader of the Seanad and Leader of Fine Gael in the Seanad. He was an unsuccessful candidate for Cork South-Central at the 2020 general election. He was re-elected to the Seanad in 2020. He was appointed Leas-Chathaoirleach of Seanad Éireann on 7 July 2020.

Following his involvement in the Oireachtas Golf Society scandal ("golfgate"), Buttimer resigned as Leas-Cathaoirleach on 21 August 2020. Buttimer and 80 others attended a golf function and dinner the previous day. At the time it was suggested it was in breach of government COVID-19 guidelines. Buttimer's role in the matter was heavily criticised, as previously Buttimer has been highly critical of those he perceived as not keeping to government guidelines. In April 2020 he had accused broadcaster Ivan Yates of "irresponsible behaviour", telling him that public health measures were "about saving lives... not socialising". In June, he had suggested Donnchadh Ó Laoghaire was "happy to abandon public health advice".

Buttimer also lost the party whip as part of his sanction. The party unanimously voted to restore the whip to Buttimer in January 2021.

He was elected as Cathaoirleach on 16 December 2022.

At the 2024 general election, Buttimer was elected to the Dáil. On 29 January 2025, he was appointed as Minister of State at the Department of Rural and Community Development and the Gaeltacht with special responsibility for community development, charities, Gaeltacht and the islands and as Minister of State at the Department of Transport with special responsibility for rural transport.

== Personal life ==
In April 2012, Buttimer came out as gay, the first Fine Gael TD to do so, saying: "I am a TD who just happens to be gay – it is just one little composition of the story that is me and I will continue to be the politician I was yesterday." He married Conchobar Ó Laoghaire in December 2017.

He was the first chair of Fine Gael LGBT.

Oireachtas
Preceded by Mark Daly	Cathaoirleach of Seanad Éireann; 2022–2024	Succeeded by Mark Daly
Political offices
Preceded by Joe O'Brien	Minister of State at the Department of Rural and Community Development and the Gaeltacht; 2025–present	Incumbent
New office	Minister of State at the Department of Transport; 2025–present	Incumbent

Dáil	Election	Deputy (Party)	Deputy (Party)	Deputy (Party)	Deputy (Party)	Deputy (Party)
22nd	1981	Eileen Desmond (Lab)	Gene Fitzgerald (FF)	Pearse Wyse (FF)	Hugh Coveney (FG)	Peter Barry (FG)
23rd	1982 (Feb)	Eileen Desmond (Lab)	Gene Fitzgerald (FF)	Pearse Wyse (FF)	Jim Corr (FG)	Peter Barry (FG)
24th	1982 (Nov)	Eileen Desmond (Lab)	Gene Fitzgerald (FF)	Pearse Wyse (FF)	Hugh Coveney (FG)	Peter Barry (FG)
25th	1987	Toddy O'Sullivan (Lab)	John Dennehy (FF)	Batt O'Keeffe (FF)	Pearse Wyse (PDs)	Peter Barry (FG)
26th	1989	Toddy O'Sullivan (Lab)	John Dennehy (FF)	Micheál Martin (FF)	Pearse Wyse (PDs)	Peter Barry (FG)
27th	1992	Toddy O'Sullivan (Lab)	Batt O'Keeffe (FF)	Micheál Martin (FF)	Pat Cox (PDs)	Peter Barry (FG)
27th	1994 by-election	Toddy O'Sullivan (Lab)	Batt O'Keeffe (FF)	Micheál Martin (FF)	Hugh Coveney (FG)	Peter Barry (FG)
28th	1997	John Dennehy (FF)	Batt O'Keeffe (FF)	Micheál Martin (FF)	Hugh Coveney (FG)	Deirdre Clune (FG)
28th	1998 by-election	John Dennehy (FF)	Batt O'Keeffe (FF)	Micheál Martin (FF)	Simon Coveney (FG)	Deirdre Clune (FG)
29th	2002	John Dennehy (FF)	Batt O'Keeffe (FF)	Micheál Martin (FF)	Simon Coveney (FG)	Dan Boyle (GP)
30th	2007	Ciarán Lynch (Lab)	Michael McGrath (FF)	Micheál Martin (FF)	Simon Coveney (FG)	Deirdre Clune (FG)
31st	2011	Ciarán Lynch (Lab)	Michael McGrath (FF)	Micheál Martin (FF)	Simon Coveney (FG)	Jerry Buttimer (FG)
32nd	2016	Donnchadh Ó Laoghaire (SF)	Michael McGrath (FF)	Micheál Martin (FF)	Simon Coveney (FG)	4 seats 2016–2024
33rd	2020	Donnchadh Ó Laoghaire (SF)	Michael McGrath (FF)	Micheál Martin (FF)	Simon Coveney (FG)	4 seats 2016–2024
34th	2024	Donnchadh Ó Laoghaire (SF)	Séamus McGrath (FF)	Micheál Martin (FF)	Jerry Buttimer (FG)	Pádraig Rice (SD)
