= Minister for Rural and Community Development and the Gaeltacht =

Irish government cabinet minister

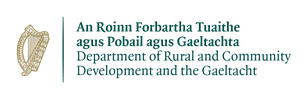

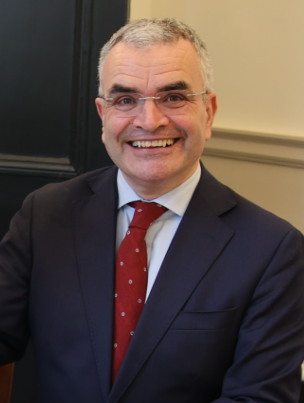
- Incumbent; Dara Calleary since 23 January 2025
- Department of Rural and Community Development and the Gaeltacht
- Type: Social affairs minister
- Status: Cabinet minister
- Member of: Government of Ireland; Council of the European Union; Dáil Éireann
- Reports to: Taoiseach
- Seat: Dublin, Ireland
- Nominator: Taoiseach
- Appointer: President of Ireland; (on the advice of the Taoiseach)
- Inaugural holder: Michael Ring
- Formation: 27 June 2020
- Salary: €210,750 (2025) (including €115,953 TD salary)
- Website: Official website

The minister for rural and community development and the Gaeltacht (Irish: An tAire Forbartha Tuaithe agus Pobail agus Gaeltachta) is a senior minister in the Government of Ireland and leads the Department of Rural and Community Development and the Gaeltacht.

The current minister for rural and community development and the Gaeltacht is Dara Calleary, TD. He is also Minister for Social Protection.

He is assisted by one minister of state:

- Jerry Buttimer, TD – Minister of State for community development, charities, Gaeltacht and the islands:

== List of officeholders ==
=== Minister for Rural and Community Development 2017–2025 ===
Name	Term of office		Party	Government
Michael Ring	14 June 2017 (Note: Ring was a minister without portfolio from 14 June to 19 July 2017 before the department was formally established.)	27 June 2020	Fine Gael	31st
Heather Humphreys	27 June 2020	23 January 2025	Fine Gael	32nd • 33rd • 34th
=== Minister for Rural and Community Development and the Gaeltacht 2025–present ===
Name	Term of office		Party	Government
Dara Calleary	23 January 2025	Incumbent	Fianna Fáil	35th
