= Saoirse McHugh =

Irish politician

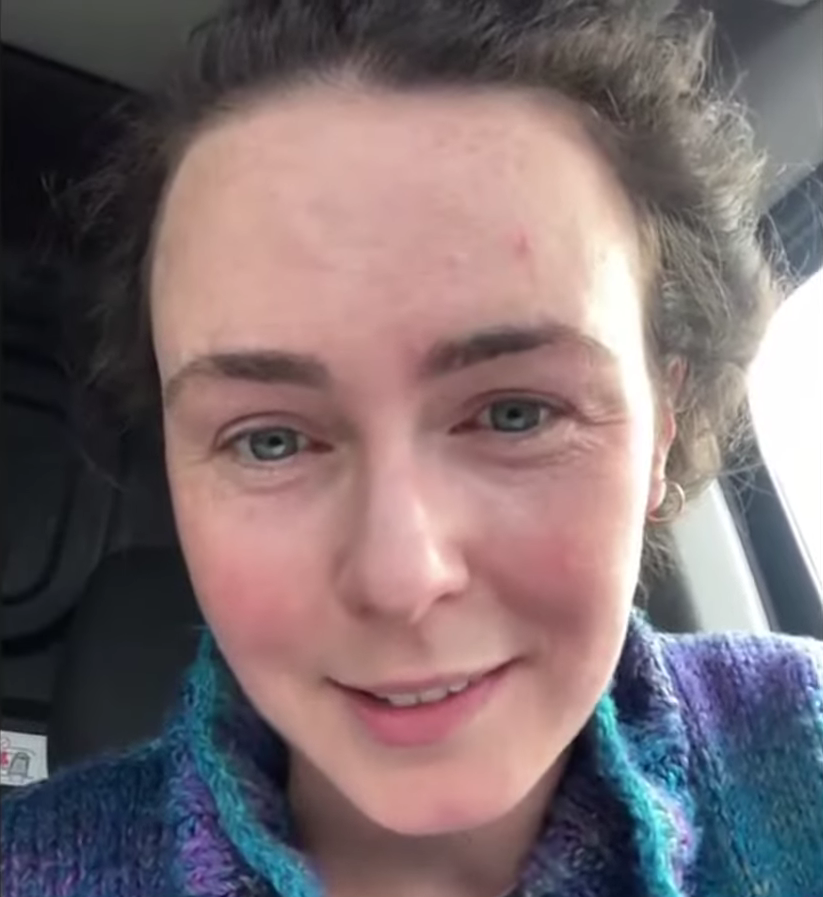
- McHugh in 2024
- Born: June 23, 1990 (age 35); United States
- Education: University College Dublin; Lancaster University
- Political party: Independent (since 2020); Green Party (before 2020)
- Partner: Colm Cafferkey

Saoirse McHugh (born 23 June 1990) is an Irish environmentalist and former Green Party politician. From Achill Island in County Mayo, she holds degrees in genetics and sustainable agriculture. McHugh was a Green Party candidate in the 2019 European Parliament election in Ireland, the 2020 Irish general election and 2020 Seanad election. She was unsuccessful in each case.

She has described herself as "an environmentalist, a democratic socialist, and a grower", and her political goal as "some beautiful eco-socialist utopia". She left the Green Party in July 2020.

== Personal life ==
Born in the United States, McHugh moved aged two to her father John's native village of Dooagh on Achill Island, where she was raised. As of 2020, she lived on Achill with her partner Colm Cafferkey, also an Achill native.

She holds a Bachelor of Science (BSc) degree in genetics from University College Dublin and a Masters in Sustainable Agriculture and Food Security from Lancaster University.

She has spoken publicly about her difficulty with bulimia, which began when she was 13 years old. She did not seek medical assistance for the bulimia until she was in her twenties, and described her first meetings with doctors as "awful experiences".

== Political career ==
=== 2019 European Parliament election ===
McHugh first stood for political office at the 2019 European Parliament election, as a Green Party candidate in the Midlands–North-West constituency. She was motivated to stand by her view of the need to combat climate change, saying that "we are running out of time". Her aunt's home in Achill had been destroyed by a storm in 2014, and McHugh began lobbying politicians of all parties to take action. However, when she lamented to Green Party leader Eamon Ryan that her efforts had little effect, Ryan persuaded her that the remedy was stand for election herself. Ryan later took a bet on her election, staking €50 on odds of 50/1.

McHugh had only recently joined the Green party, and made little impact in the election until an RTÉ television debate in the final days of the campaign, when she challenged independent candidate Peter Casey. "Millionaires blaming migrants is an old trope and it's boring," said McHugh. She also jokingly advised Casey to "go on Dancing with the Stars if you want attention that much."

On election night, opinion polls showed McHugh having 12% of the first-preference vote; this was described by the media as "unexpected", because McHugh was a first-time candidate. This opinion polling was associated with a "Green Wave", which saw increased support for the Green Party at the time. In the election itself, McHugh received 51,019 (8.58%) first-preference votes, placing her sixth out of seventeen candidates.

=== 2019 Seanad by-election ===
There was speculation from some party members that McHugh would run for the Seanad seat on the Agricultural Panel which fell vacant in May 2019 when Green Party senator Grace O'Sullivan won a seat in the European Parliament. Several senior Greens praised her ability to "attract cross-party support", and believed that a seat in the Seanad would help her to win a seat in Dáil Éireann at the next general election.

McHugh had support from party leader Eamon Ryan, who said he would "love it" if she was elected. He described her as "hugely talented and committed particularly around the issues of rural development, farming and food policy".

However, Pippa Hackett, a councillor on Offaly County Council, received the party's nomination to compete for that position, and was elected unopposed. Later in 2019, McHugh stated that she was opposed to a coalition government between the Green Party and Fianna Fáil or Fine Gael.

=== 2020 elections ===
McHugh was nominated in the Mayo constituency for the Green Party at the 2020 general election. She finished seventh in the four-seat constituency, receiving 6.5% of the first-preference vote. She also contested the March 2020 Seanad election as the only Green Party candidate on the five-seat Cultural and Educational Panel, polling second on the first count, but was not elected. In December 2020, she recalled how some Green Party Teachtaí Dála (TDs) had refused to vote for her, while people from other parties had promised her a lower preference vote.

=== Resignation from the Green Party ===
In June 2020, the party leadership proposed the draft programme for government with Fianna Fáil and Fine Gael to a vote of the membership. McHugh opposed the proposal, stating that it was not "Greener business as usual", and that "a true Green New Deal recognizes that action to combat climate change will not be successful unless it simultaneously ushers in social and economic reforms that will distribute opportunity more fairly and tackle inequality".

McHugh left the Green Party the following month, along with other young members. She stated on Twitter that it would "turn my stomach" to remain in the Green Party. The Irish Times reported that while McHugh had a lot of support from younger Greens, she "irritated" others who portrayed her as "big on rhetoric". Her departure coincided with the party's leadership election, and the party's deputy leader Catherine Martin, who had narrowly failed in her leadership challenge, asked "Why are we losing good people, and what can we do to change that? Maybe we have to reform the party in some way". Later in 2020, other prominent younger Greens also left the party.

Described by TheJournal.ie as one of the most high-profile former members of the Green Party, McHugh has remained critical of the coalition government's environmental policies. In December 2020, she told TheJournal.ie, "When you look at what the government is coming out with in terms of climate, they may as well be climate change deniers". She continued environmental activism since leaving party politics, including writing on the benefits of rewilding.

She unsuccessfully contested the 2024 European Parliament election as an independent candidate in the Midlands–North-West constituency.

== Political views ==
McHugh is an eco-socialist who has expressed interest in Green anarchism. McHugh has argued that capitalism, particularly neoliberal capitalism, is causing environmental degradation, rising inequality, and social instability. McHugh is critical of the incremental approaches to climate change, such as urging individuals to make small lifestyle changes like reducing meat consumption or opting for eco-friendly alternatives. McHugh maintains that such actions cannot address the root cause of the crisis, which she sees as the economic system itself. McHugh has argued that the solution lies in dismantling capitalist structures altogether, which put her at odds with the majority of the Green Party. She has expressed disappointment with the Greens’ gradualist stance, particularly when the party chose to enter a coalition government with Fine Gael and Fianna Fáil following the 2020 general election.

McHugh identifies as a feminist but criticises the focus on having more women in power without addressing systemic issues. She argues that true feminism cannot support capitalism, as women bear a disproportionate burden under it, and that it must oppose policies that allow suffering, such as tax avoidance and migrant deaths. McHugh believes feminism should focus on collective action to dismantle patriarchy, not just individual opportunities. She has emphasised what she feels are the greater challenges faced by migrants and women of colour in accessing reproductive healthcare, stressing that feminism must uplift all disadvantaged groups together.
