= 2024 Green Party leadership elections (Ireland) =

Irish political party elections

2024 Green Party leadership election
- 5 – 8 July 2024
- Turnout: 1,896 (55.36% of 3,425 eligible voters)
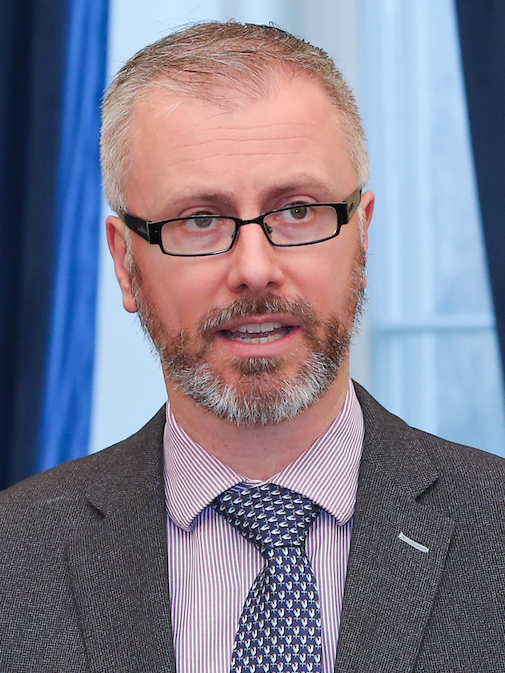

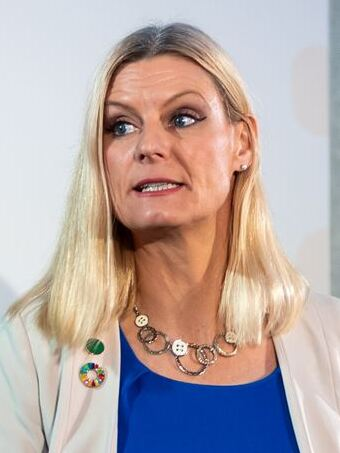
Candidate	Roderic O'Gorman	Pippa Hackett
Popular vote	984	912
Percentage	51.90%	48.10%
Leader before election
Eamon Ryan
Elected Leader
Roderic O'Gorman

Leadership elections occurred in Ireland's Green Party in July 2024, after Eamon Ryan announced his intention to resign as party leader. Ryan, who had led the party since 2011, announced his resignation on 18 June 2024. Following the announcement, deputy leader Catherine Martin announced she would be stepping down as deputy leader, triggering a deputy leadership election.

The election was held online over three days. Roderic O'Gorman won the election and became leader of the party on 8 July 2024. Of the 3,425 votes available, O'Gorman received 984 votes, while Hackett received 912.

The party's deputy leadership election was held on 14 July 2024, and was subsequently won by Róisín Garvey.

== Background ==
At the 2024 European Parliament election and local elections held on 7 June, the Green Party lost both of its MEPs and half of its local councillors.

Ryan announced his resignation as party leader after the 18 June meeting of the cabinet. Ryan also announced his intention to resign from office as Minister for the Environment, Climate and Communications and Minister for Transport in the coalition government of which his party was a member, once the Green Party had elected a new leader. Ryan's resignation made him the second party leader in Ireland's coalition government to announce their resignation during 2024 following that of Leo Varadkar, who stepped down as leader of Fine Gael and as Taoiseach. Ryan said that the election results were not his reason for stepping down from the role, but that he had made the decision to do so several months earlier "for a variety of reasons including family commitments". Speaking on the 18 June edition of RTÉ's Six One News, he also confirmed he would not contest the next general election.

On 19 June, a meeting of the Green Party's executive committee set 8 July as the date for the leadership election.

== Candidates ==
A number of Green Party TDs, including Malcolm Noonan, a junior minister in the coalition government, and Neasa Hourigan, TD for Dublin Central, ruled themselves out of running to replace Ryan.

Candidate	Office	Announced	Endorsements
Pippa Hackett (Senator on the Agricultural Panel)	Minister of State at the Department of Agriculture, Food and the Marine	19 June 2024	Senator Pauline O'Reilly and TDs Brian Leddin, Steven Matthews, and Ossian Smyth
Roderic O'Gorman (TD for Dublin West)	Minister for Children, Equality, Disability, Integration and Youth	19 June 2024	Marc Ó Cathasaigh, Malcolm Noonan, Patrick Costello, and Joe O'Brien who initially considered standing, as well as several councillors including Hazel Chu

Pippa Hackett is a farmer from County Offaly and has positioned herself to be the leader who can win support from farmers and rebuild trust with rural voters. All Green Party leaders to date have been from Dublin.

Roderic O'Gorman said he believed the party needed to broaden the focus on its policies beyond its climate and nature restoration, and that he would try to form a "progressive alliance" with Labour and the Social Democrats who are seen as centre-left. Hackett responded to O'Gorman via X by saying she would work with any party and that the Green Party was "not the SDLGP".

== Deputy leadership election ==
2024 Green Party deputy leadership election
- 14 July 2024
- Turnout: 653 (71.21% of 917 eligible voters)
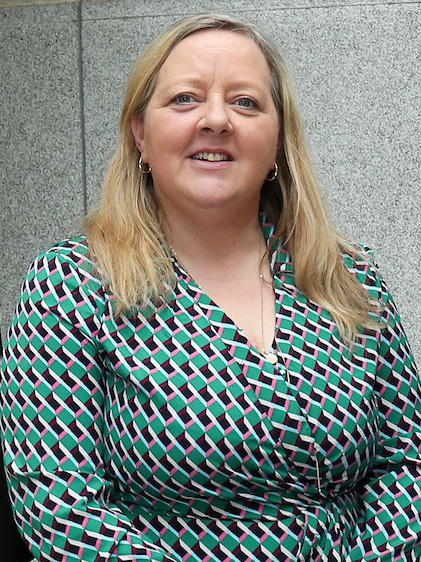

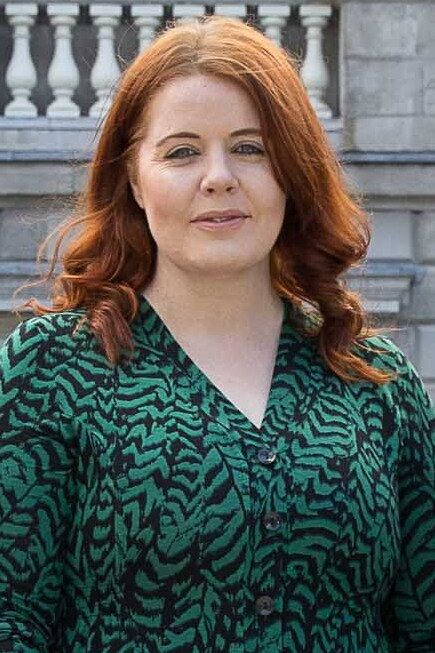
Candidate	Róisín Garvey	Neasa Hourigan
Popular vote	333	320
Percentage	50.99%	49.01%
Deputy leader before election
Catherine Martin
Elected Deputy leader
Róisín Garvey

Following Ryan's announcement, deputy leader Catherine Martin also confirmed she would step down from her post, but said she would continue her role as Minister for Tourism, Culture, Arts, Gaeltacht, Sport and Media, and contest her Dáil seat in Dublin Rathdown at the next general election. Minister of State Ossian Smyth had initially declared his candidacy but pulled out following the election of O'Gorman as leader, saying that the deputy leader should be a woman. The election for the deputy leadership was held on 14 July. The election was won by Senator Róisín Garvey.

=== Candidates ===
- Neasa Hourigan, TD for Dublin Central; former Chair of the Committee on Budgetary Oversight
- Róisín Garvey, Senator

==== Withdrawn ====
- Ossian Smyth, TD for Dún Laoghaire; Minister of State at the Department of Public Expenditure, National Development Plan Delivery and Reform and Minister of State at the Department of the Environment, Climate and Communications
