= Pippa Hackett =

Irish politician (born 1974)

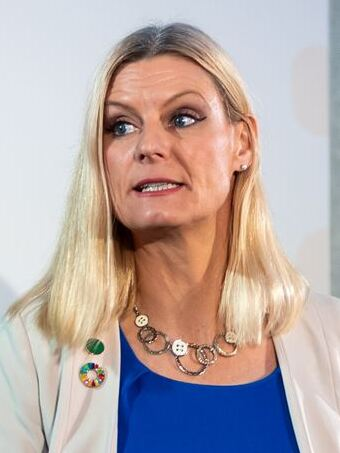
- Hackett in 2023

Minister of State
- 2020–2025: Agriculture, Food and the Marine

Senator
- In office 1 November 2019 – 31 January 2025
- Constituency: Agricultural Panel

Personal details
- Born: 8 January 1974 (age 52) County Mayo, Ireland
- Party: Green Party
- Spouse: Mark Hackett
- Children: 4
- Education: Aberystwyth University; University of Essex; University College Dublin; University of Limerick

Pippa Hackett (born 8 January 1974) is an Irish Green Party politician who served as a Minister of State at the Department of Agriculture, Food and the Marine from June 2020 to January 2025. She was one of three Ministers of State in attendance at cabinet, but without a vote. She was a Senator for the Agricultural Panel from November 2019 to January 2025.

== Early life and education ==
Hackett was born in Galway, but is a native of Ballindine, County Mayo. During her time in Britain, she studied Equine Science at Aberystwyth University and Agriculture at the University of Essex. Back in Ireland, she studied a Postgraduate Diploma in Equine Science at University College Dublin in 1996, and gained her PhD in Sports Biomechanics at the University of Limerick.

== Political career ==
Hackett joined the Green Party in around 2016, upon the recommendation of a neighbour of hers, Christopher Fettes, the party founder. At the 2019 local elections, she was elected to Offaly County Council for the Edenderry Area.

She was elected unopposed, as a Senator for the Agricultural Panel in a by-election on 1 November 2019. The vacancy was caused by the election of Senator Grace O'Sullivan to the European Parliament in May 2019.

She was an unsuccessful Green party candidate for the Laois–Offaly constituency at the 2020 general election, coming sixth in the five-seat constituency, with a total of 4,255 votes in the final count.

At the 2020 Seanad election on 30 March, she was re-elected to the Agricultural Panel. On the formation of a new government on 27 June 2020 between Fianna Fáil, Fine Gael and the Green Party, she was appointed as Minister of State at the Department of Agriculture, Food and the Marine with responsibility for Land Use and Biodiversity. She became the first senator to be appointed as a Minister of State and is one of three Ministers of State attending cabinet, a position commonly known as a super junior minister.

On 24 March 2021, Hackett was one of three Green Party senators to table a motion of no confidence against party chairperson Hazel Chu, after Chu announced her candidacy in a Seanad by-election as an Independent. The motion was later withdrawn at the request of then deputy leader Catherine Martin and Chu was not sanctioned for her decision.

On 19 June 2024, Hackett announced her candidacy in the Green Party leadership election following the resignation of Eamon Ryan. A focal point of her campaign was improving the party's reputation among rural voters, claiming the party had an "image problem". She received several high-profile endorsements, including from Brian Leddin, Ossian Smyth and Steven Matthews. She was defeated by Roderic O'Gorman who received 984 votes to her 912 votes.

She was an unsuccessful candidate for the Offaly constituency at the 2024 general election.

== Personal life ==
Hackett lives on a farm in County Offaly near Geashill with her husband Mark, whom she met at university in Essex, and their four children. Her husband was co-opted to take her seat on Offaly County Council. Her son, Charlie, ran unsuccessfully in the 2024 local elections.

Political offices
Preceded by Andrew Doyle	Minister of State at the Department of Agriculture, Food and the Marine; 2020–2025; With: Martin Heydon	Succeeded by Office abolished
