= 2024 Green Party leadership election =

Green Party leadership elections took place in the following countries during 2024:

- 2024 Green Party of Aotearoa New Zealand co-leadership election
- 2024 Green Party leadership election (Ireland)

== See also ==
- 2024 Green Party presidential primaries in the United States
