= Hazel Chu =

Irish politician (born 1980)

Cllr Hazel Chu
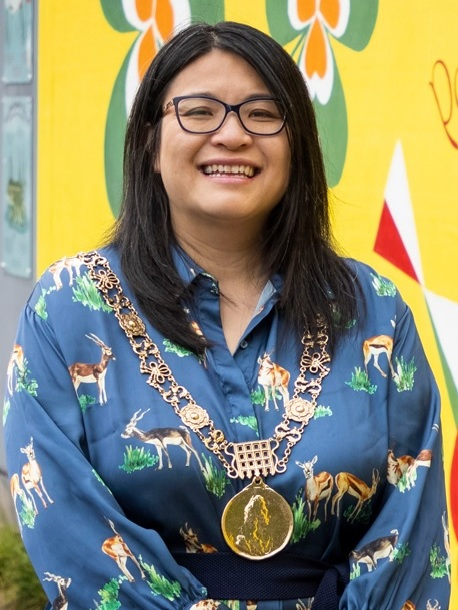
- Chu in 2021

Dublin City Councillor
- Incumbent
- Assumed office 24 May 2019
- Constituency: Pembroke

Deputy leader of the Green Party
- Incumbent
- Assumed office 28 January 2026
- Leader: Roderic O'Gorman
- Preceded by: Róisín Garvey

Lord Mayor of Dublin
- In office 29 June 2020 – 28 June 2021
- Preceded by: Tom Brabazon
- Succeeded by: Alison Gilliland

Personal details
- Born: Hazel Chung-fai Chu; 3 November 1980 (age 45) Dublin, Ireland
- Party: Green Party
- Spouse: Patrick Costello (m. 2021)
- Children: 1
- Education: University College Dublin; King's Inns
- Website: Hazel Chu

Hazel Chung-fai Chu (born 3 November 1980) is an Irish Green Party politician who has been a member of Dublin City Council since May 2019. She was elected deputy leader of the Green Party on 28 January 2026. She was chair of the Green Party from December 2019 to December 2021. She was the first Irish-born person of Chinese descent elected to political office on the island of Ireland. (Note: Anna Lo, who was born and raised in Hong Kong, was previously elected, in 2007, to the Northern Ireland Assembly, representing Belfast South.) She served as Lord Mayor of Dublin from 2020 to 2021, and in doing so became the first person of Chinese ethnicity to be mayor of a European capital. She is the party's spokesperson for Public Expenditure, Infrastructure, Public Service Reform, Digitalisation & Media.

== Early life ==
Chu was born in at the Rotunda Hospital in Dublin in November 1980. Her parents, Stella Choi Yau-fan and David Chu Tak-leung, are from the New Territories of Hong Kong, who separately immigrated to Ireland in the 1970s. They met while working in the kitchen of a restaurant in Dublin and subsequently married, launching a takeaway chip van and other enterprises.

Chu was raised initially in the suburb of Firhouse, South Dublin, where up to 9 members of the extended family shared a 3-bedroom house, and, from age 6, lived in Celbridge, County Kildare. A brother, Joseph, was born when Chu was about 10. After her parents divorced, her mother established four restaurants, while her father returned to Hong Kong to run a café there.

== Education ==
Chu attended a local primary school, and secondary school boarding in Rathdown School in Glenageary, followed by Mount Sackville School in Chapelizod. Chu has explained the boarding school as an example of how language barriers are issues for migrants: her parents didn't read English and she had to translate any letter that came from school for them; the letter informing Chu's parents that they needed to apply for the local secondary school was missed and she couldn't attend since the deadline for applications passed before the error was discovered. Her parents later took out a loan to send her to a boarding school.

Chu graduated with a BA in politics and history from University College Dublin (UCD) in 2002. She was active in college debating and was Auditor (chairperson) of the Politics Society. She completed a legal diploma and barrister-at-law degree at the King's Inns, and in 2007 she became the first Irish-born person of Chinese descent to be called to the Irish Bar. She received a master's degree in marketing practice from UCD in 2011.

== Professional career ==
After graduating from the King's Inns, Chu did not practise as a barrister, but worked as a fundraising manager for St Michael's House and an artist and production manager for Electric Picnic. She spent six months travelling and working in Australia and New Zealand, and part of a year as a volunteer teacher in a remote village in China, near Guilin, in 2009. In 2010 she secured a fellowship as a marketing consultant in New York for Bord Bia. She returned to Ireland in 2012 and worked for Forfás and in the Office of the Chief Scientific Advisor, before working for the NDRC, and then Diageo Ireland, where she headed communications for five-and-a-half years.

== Political career ==
=== Green Party ===
Chu managed the campaign for her partner Patrick Costello's successful election at the 2014 Dublin City Council election, in which he topped the poll in the Rathgar–Rathmines local electoral area (LEA) as a Green Party candidate. Chu became a member of the Green Party in 2015 and served on the party's National Executive from 2016 to 2021. In 2017, with Catherine Martin, Grace O'Sullivan and others she founded Mná Glasa, the party's woman group, and became its co-chair. She was elected National Coordinator of the Green Party in 2017 and became its Spokesperson for Enterprise in 2018. In 2019 she was elected Cathaoirleach of the party for a two year term.

In January 2026, Chu was elected as deputy leader of the Green Party defeating Louth County Councillor, Marianne Butler with a 63% to 37% margin of victory.

=== Dublin City councillor ===
Chu stood as a Green Party candidate in the Pembroke LEA in the 2019 Dublin City Council election. She was the first candidate in the country to be declared elected. She topped the poll, receiving a historic 33.1% of the first preference vote. Later that same year she was elected as Chairperson of the Green Party, beating Pauline O'Reilly of Galway West.

She was re-elected as a Councillor for Pembroke LEA in the 2024 Dublin City Council election, reaching the quota on the first count and again being the first candidate in the county to be elected.

=== Lord Mayor of Dublin ===
On 29 June 2020, Chu was elected as the Lord Mayor of Dublin, succeeding interim mayor Tom Brabazon. Chu is the first person of colour to hold the role, and the first ethnic Chinese mayor of a major European capital.

=== By-elections ===
On 22 March 2021, Chu announced her candidacy as an independent candidate for a Seanad by-election; Chu received the signatures of six of twelve Green Party TDs as part of this nomination, including deputy leader Catherine Martin, with six Green TDs and another four senators opposing her candidacy. Ten days prior, the Green Party executive council, and the majority of Green TDs and Senators, had agreed to not run candidates for the election, leaving each of the larger two government parties, Fine Gael and Fianna Fáil, to run one candidate each, in line with an informal agreement. As a result, Chu's party leader indicated that he would not vote for her, and further that her role as chairperson of the party might be discussed internally. During a parliamentary party meeting on 24 March, a motion of no confidence was tabled against Chu by senators Pippa Hackett, Pauline O'Reilly and Róisín Garvey. During the meeting, Eamon Ryan is reported to have confirmed the absence of a formal pact to support the candidates of the other coalition parties, which was contradicted by O'Reilly, saying "If you call a spade a spade, we're in Government, that's a pact". Deputy leader, Catherine Martin urged the senators to withdraw the motion and it was later replaced with a motion calling for Chu to temporarily step aside from the position as party chair for the duration of the election. This was passed by 11 votes to five at a meeting of the Parliamentary Party. The Executive Council of the party, however, decided not to follow the parliamentary party's decision and Chu remained in the position of chair until the end of her term in December 2021. Chu was not successful at the by-election, receiving 10 first preference votes (4.9%).

Chu ran unsuccessfully in the 2022 Seanad by-election, receiving 13.2% of the first preference votes, and was commended by the party for "championing climate action and inclusion".

On 27 April 2021, on the resignation of Eoghan Murphy from his Dáil Éireann seat in Dublin Bay South, after consulting with party leadership Chu announced she would participate in the Green Party selection convention for the party nomination, competing with Dublin City councillor Claire Byrne; Chu did not receive this nomination, with Byrne selected by local party members to compete in the election.

=== General elections ===
On 15 July 2024, Chu was selected as the Green Party candidate for Dublin Bay South at the 2024 general election, following the announcement of the retirement of Eamon Ryan, the incumbent Green TD. At the election in November, Chu received over 3,000 first preference votes and was eliminated on the 7th count.

=== 2025 Seanad election ===
Chu contested the 2025 Seanad election in the Dublin University constituency, losing to Aubrey McCarthy by 64 votes.

== Political views ==
Chu has stated she is in favour of increasing diversity in Irish politics, emphasising the importance of representation to normalise public office for people of colour. She has acknowledged the abuse faced by herself and others, such as Yemi Adenuga and Uruemu Adejinmi, and stressed the need for political parties to actively recruit candidates from diverse backgrounds. While highlighting the strength of allyship, she has criticised the slow pace of change and called for systemic action, urging all parties to reject discriminatory behaviour and prioritise inclusion.

Chu has expressed her commitment to the Green Party but has been vocal about internal issues, including bullying and the need for greater diversity within its ranks. She has described the Green Party as a broad church but noted tensions between its activist roots and the compromises of coalition government, which have caused friction among members. Chu has stated that these compromises, such as policy shifts on issues like CETA, have alienated some supporters who initially joined the party for its progressive social agenda.

Chu has supported ending the Direct Provision system, describing it as a societal stain akin to the Magdalene Laundries and the Mother and Baby Homes. She has highlighted the damaging effects of Direct Provision on children and adults alike, calling for its complete abolition and expressing confidence in the efforts of Minister Roderic O'Gorman and his team to deliver on this goal. She has also criticised Dublin's urban planning, advocating for increased residential zoning in the city centre and the repurposing of empty student accommodation to address homelessness.

== Personal life ==
Chu resides in Dublin. She met her husband, Patrick Costello, before her UCD studies, and they have been together since her time at King's Inns. The couple have one daughter. They married in June 2021. Chu speaks Cantonese fluently, and some Mandarin.

== Harassment ==
Chu has spoken of racism, bullying and harassment while growing up. Subsequent to her election to the council and the media attention around it, Chu became a target of racist online harassment, particularly on Twitter. Some of her harassers targeted her skin colour but others labelled her a migrant and denied that she could be an Irish national. Further, some claimed that she was a product of the so-called "great replacement", a conspiracy theory propagated by the alt-right. The harassment later escalated to phone calls to her home. Justin Barrett, leader of the far-right fringe group the National Party, publicly indicated that if he ever got into power, he would attempt to strip Chu of her citizenship, despite her Irish birth. Chu stated her resolution to not be intimidated by the harassment and to continue with her political career.

In January 2021 Chu described having been racially abused by a group of far-right protestors who had gathered outside the Mansion House, the official residence of the Lord Mayor.

== Notes ==
Civic offices
Preceded by Tom Brabazon	Lord Mayor of Dublin; 2020–2021	Succeeded by Alison Gilliland
Party political offices
Preceded by Roderic O'Gorman	Cathaoirleach of the Green Party; 2019–2021	Succeeded by Pauline O'Reilly
Preceded by Róisín Garvey	Deputy leader of the Green Party; 2026–present	Succeeded by incumbent
