= 2019 Seanad by-election =

By-election to the 25th Seanad

A by-election was due to be held for a vacancy in the Agricultural Panel of Seanad Éireann on Friday, 22 November 2019. The vacancy was caused by the election of the Green Party's Grace O'Sullivan to the European Parliament. At the close of nominations on 1 November 2019, only one candidate had been nominated, and Pippa Hackett of the Green Party was deemed elected unopposed.

== Election system ==
The electorate in by-elections to the vocational panels consists of Oireachtas members only. For this election, it consisted of 154 TDs and 59 senators. To be nominated, a candidate must have the signature of nine members of the Oireachtas. Nominations closed on 25 October 2019 at 12 noon.

All votes are cast by postal ballot, and counted using the single transferable vote. Under this system, voters can rank candidates in order of their preference, 1 as their first preference, 2 for second preference, and so on. Ballots are initially given a value of 1,000 to allow calculation of the quota (Droop quota) where all ballots are distributed in the case of a surplus.

== Process and dates ==
Grace O'Sullivan resigned on 1 July 2019, with a notice of the vacancy sent to the Minister for Housing, Planning and Local Government on 25 September 2019. The minister is required to make a Seanad by-election order within 180 days after receiving a notice of a vacancy. On 15 October 2019, Minister Eoghan Murphy made an order for the by-election which set the following dates:

- 25 October 2019: close of receiving nominations;
- 1 November 2019: ruling on nominations;
- 8 November 2019: issuing of ballot papers;
- 22 November 2019, at 11 a.m.: close of poll.

== Campaign ==
Pippa Hackett was announced as the Green Party candidate in September 2019. No other parties contested the by-election. On 25 October 2019, it was reported that Hackett would be unopposed as no other individual received the necessary ten nominations from members of the Oireachtas to contest the election. Hackett took her seat on 5 November 2019.
