= Roderic O'Gorman =

Irish politician (born 1981)

Roderic O'Gorman TD
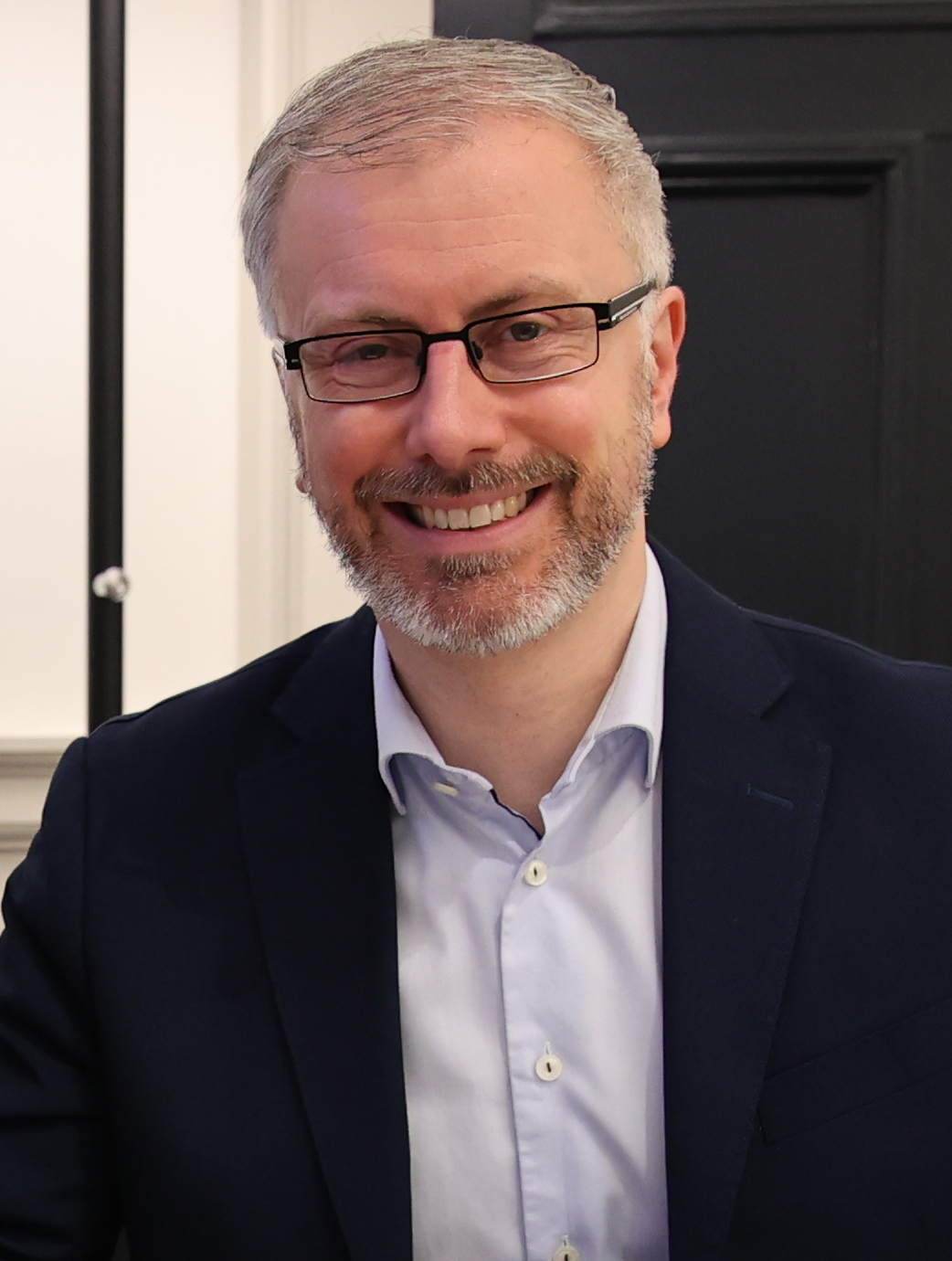
- O'Gorman in 2024

Minister for Children, Equality, Disability, Integration and Youth
- In office 27 June 2020 – 23 January 2025
- Taoiseach: Micheál Martin; Leo Varadkar; Simon Harris
- Preceded by: Katherine Zappone
- Succeeded by: Norma Foley

Leader of the Green Party
- Incumbent
- Assumed office 8 July 2024
- Deputy: Róisín Garvey; Hazel Chu
- Preceded by: Eamon Ryan

Teachta Dála
- Incumbent
- Assumed office February 2020
- Constituency: Dublin West

Personal details
- Born: 12 December 1981 (age 44) Mulhuddart, Dublin, Ireland
- Party: Green Party
- Spouse: Ray Healy (m. 2023)
- Education: Trinity College Dublin; London School of Economics
- Website: rodericogorman.com

Roderic O'Gorman (born 12 December 1981) is an Irish Green Party politician who has served as leader of the Green Party since July 2024. He has been a Teachta Dála (TD) for the Dublin West constituency since 2020. He previously served as Minister for Children, Equality, Disability, Integration and Youth from 2020 to 2025 and chair of the Green Party from 2011 to 2019.

== Early and personal life ==
O'Gorman is originally from Mulhuddart, a small outer suburb of Dublin. He now lives in Blanchardstown. He completed an undergraduate law degree at Trinity College Dublin, followed by a Master of Laws in European Union (EU) law in the London School of Economics. In 2011 he completed his PhD, with a dissertation entitled 'Union citizenship, social rights and the Marshallian approach', at Trinity College Dublin.

O'Gorman started an academic career at Griffith College, where he lectured and was a course director for five years. He next worked as a law lecturer in the School of Law and Government at Dublin City University. He served as the programme chair of the Bachelor of Arts in Economics, Politics and Law. He has taken leave in order to serve as a TD.

He has openly identified as gay. He has said that he knew he wanted to be a politician even before he identified his sexual orientation.

In August 2023, he married his long-term partner Ray Healy.

== Political career ==
O'Gorman's first engagement with green politics came at the age of 10 years when he canvassed on behalf of his local councillor Trevor Sargent, in his successful bid at the 1992 general election.

O'Gorman joined the Young Greens while studying law at Trinity College Dublin in the early 2000s. He supported John Gormley in his bid for the leadership of the Green Party in 2002. O'Gorman was considered one of the most ardent supporters of the Civil Partnership and Certain Rights and Obligations of Cohabitants Act 2010, which introduced civil partnership for gay and lesbian couples.

He ran in Dublin West at the 2007, 2011, and 2016 general elections, as well as by-elections in 2011 and 2014, but was unsuccessful in all of these. At the 2014 Fingal County Council election, O'Gorman won a seat in the local electoral area of Castleknock, topping the poll to retain his seat in 2019.

At the 2020 general election, he was elected as a TD for Dublin West.

=== Ministerial career ===
On 27 June 2020, O'Gorman was appointed Minister for Children, Equality, Disability, Integration and Youth in the Government of the 33rd Dáil.

==== Photo with Peter Tatchell ====
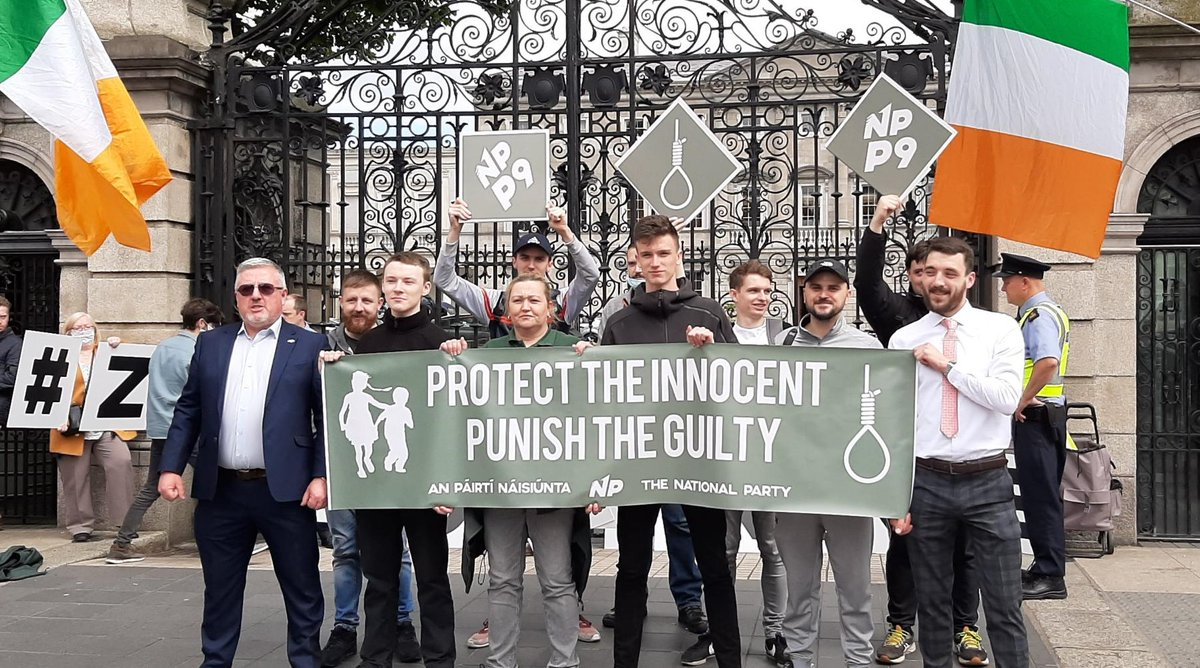
National Party members bear a banner depicting a noose, outside Dáil Éireann

Shortly after his appointment to cabinet, O'Gorman was criticised on social media for a tweet containing a photo of himself and Peter Tatchell under the heading "Happy Pride . Delighted that @PeterTatchell is marching with @greenparty_ie today". The latter is an LGBT activist and member of the Green Party of England and Wales; he had been criticised for remarks made in 1997 regarding paedophilia. Newstalk presenter Ciara Kelly, and actor John Connors both pressed Tatchell for his current views on the issues.

O'Gorman issued a public statement via Twitter clarifying his own position and his opposition to paedophilia, and that he had been unaware of Tatchell's past remarks. Continuing, O'Gorman said attacks on social media on him regarding the issue were "rooted in homophobia" from the far right. He said that neither he, his party, nor the government had any plans to lower the age of consent for sexual activity in Ireland.

John Connors later appeared at a rally entitled "hands off our kids" held against O'Gorman outside Dáil Éireann which included members of the Irish Freedom Party and the National Party, who unfurled a banner at the demonstration depicting a noose. Following the rally, Connors made an apology to O'Gorman, saying that he had been "politically naive" and contributed to "hurtful and false assertions" about the TD: "What is difficult for me to accept is that my own misguided anger led me to appear to feed an army of trolls and support groups whose views I find repugnant, whose politics are rotten and whose methods are ugly." O'Gorman said he accepted the apology and considered the issue resolved.

=== 2020 to present ===
In July 2020, O'Gorman announced his intention to make it easier for those under the age of 16 to legally change their gender with their parent's consent. That same month he also announced a "root and branch" review of the "fragmented" child care sector, with the intention that after 10 months a new agency would be created that could pull together and co-ordinate the many different committees and national bodies already tasked with oversight of Irish childcare as well as cutting through red tape. He also pledged to increase financial support for parents who choose to look after their children themselves rather than using childcare services.

In February 2021 O'Gorman oversaw the publishing of a white paper outlining the government's plan to abolish direct provision and replace it with a new system to be fully implemented by the end of 2024. Under the new system, those claiming asylum in Ireland will initially be housed in one of six state-owned Reception and Integration Centres with own-door or own-room accommodation. After 4 months, applicants will be housed in the community. Writing in the paper, O'Gorman stated "Each county will be asked to accommodate applicants for International Protection so that the International Protection accommodation process becomes a standard feature of Irish cities and towns and to ensure that applicants do not become ghettoised in any one area".

In March 2021 O'Gorman extended paid parental leave from two weeks to five weeks, as well as allowing parental leave to be taken at any time in the first two years after the birth of a child. O'Gorman said "Supporting working parents to achieve a better work-life balance is something I and my Government colleagues are committed to, so I am delighted that parents can now take up parent's leave and parent's benefit."

In April 2021 O'Gorman began moves to legislate against the practice of conversion therapy in Ireland, saying the Government "must be proactive in banning practices that not only propagandise harmful and discriminatory messages, but ones that also have serious negative consequences on a young person’s mental health, with the potential to inflict long-lasting damage. Legislating for a ban on conversion therapy will send a clear and unambiguous message to everyone, both younger and older, that a person’s sexual orientation, gender identity or gender expression is not up for debate."

On 17 December 2022, he was re-appointed to the same position following Leo Varadkar's appointment as Taoiseach.

In March 2023, O'Gorman stated on RTÉ's The Week in Politics that he was being subjected daily to online abuse, and that his team must remove comments alleging that he is a paedophile and child groomer from his social media accounts. He said "I'm able to take it, but for young people who are online and having to face similar attacks, it is really difficult and I think it's important we call it out. I'm also aware that right now online and in various public fora, a lot of people who are gay or advocating on LGBT+ issues are facing vicious abuse." The comments were made after a member of the public was heard to repeatedly verbally abuse him in the background of an RTÉ Weather outside broadcast.

In April 2023, Senator Sharon Keogan asked O'Gorman to answer questions in the Senate about a spending matter. Between 2021 and 2022, the Irish government discovered that €1,100,000 it had allocated to be spent through various schemes was never used. That money was then pooled together and reallocated to a number of LGBT groups by O'Gorman's department. Keogan asked O'Gorman "Why were only LGBT organisations in receipt of the funding? Were there no other initiatives that would have benefited from this?" before stating that unnamed parties were accusing O'Gorman of engaging "in a sort of ideology-based parochialism, prioritising pet projects which fall under your Government's remit over others". A reportedly furious O'Gorman defended the action as a “standard and commonplace feature of department financial procedure" and noted 26 similar transfers had also occurred in a similar time period, but this was the only one that he, a gay man, was being asked about. O'Gorman accused Keogan of "peddling lies" and "in doing so, although always implied, always unspoken, the charge rests that I as a gay politician must be up to no good in an effort to benefit my own community. That I would go as far as to take funding away from other vulnerable groups to do so". O'Gorman reiterated his defence of the spending, denied any bias, and suggested that Keogan was acting entirely in bad faith and that she knew the spending was entirely routine.

=== Leader of the Green Party ===
Following the resignation of Eamon Ryan as leader of the Green Party in June 2024, O'Gorman stood as a candidate in the leadership election to succeed him. He defeated Pippa Hackett who received 912 votes to his 984 votes. He became leader on 8 July 2024.

At the 2024 general election, O'Gorman was re-elected to the Dáil while the Green Party's other 11 TDs lost their seats. He is the only member of the party in the 34th Dáil.

On 1 May 2025, he was re-elected unopposed as the leader of the Green Party. The party holds a leadership election within 6 months of the last general election.

Political offices
| Preceded by Katherine Zappone as Children and Youth Affairs | Minister for Children, Equality, Disability, Integration and Youth; 2020–2025 | Succeeded by Norma Foley as Minister for Children, Disability and Equality |
Party political offices
| Preceded by Eamon Ryan | Leader of the Green Party; 2024–present | Incumbent |

| Dáil | Election | Deputy (Party) | Deputy (Party) | Deputy (Party) | Deputy (Party) | Deputy (Party) |
|---|---|---|---|---|---|---|
| 22nd | 1981 | Jim Mitchell (FG) | Brian Lenihan Snr (FF) | Richard Burke (FG) | Eileen Lemass (FF) | Brian Fleming (FG) |
| 23rd | 1982 (Feb) | Jim Mitchell (FG) | Brian Lenihan Snr (FF) | Richard Burke (FG) | Liam Lawlor (FF) | Brian Fleming (FG) |
| 23rd | 1982 by-election | Jim Mitchell (FG) | Brian Lenihan Snr (FF) | Liam Skelly (FG) | Liam Lawlor (FF) | Brian Fleming (FG) |
| 24th | 1982 (Nov) | Jim Mitchell (FG) | Brian Lenihan Snr (FF) | Liam Skelly (FG) | Eileen Lemass (FF) | Tomás Mac Giolla (WP) |
| 25th | 1987 | Jim Mitchell (FG) | Brian Lenihan Snr (FF) | Pat O'Malley (PDs) | Liam Lawlor (FF) | Tomás Mac Giolla (WP) |
| 26th | 1989 | Jim Mitchell (FG) | Brian Lenihan Snr (FF) | Austin Currie (FG) | Liam Lawlor (FF) | Tomás Mac Giolla (WP) |
| 27th | 1992 | Joan Burton (Lab) | Brian Lenihan Snr (FF) | Austin Currie (FG) | Liam Lawlor (FF) | 4 seats 1992–2002 |
| 27th | 1996 by-election | Joan Burton (Lab) | Brian Lenihan Jnr (FF) | Austin Currie (FG) | Liam Lawlor (FF) | 4 seats 1992–2002 |
| 28th | 1997 | Joe Higgins (SP) | Brian Lenihan Jnr (FF) | Austin Currie (FG) | Liam Lawlor (FF) | 4 seats 1992–2002 |
| 29th | 2002 | Joe Higgins (SP) | Brian Lenihan Jnr (FF) | Joan Burton (Lab) | 3 seats 2002–2011 | |
| 30th | 2007 | Leo Varadkar (FG) | Brian Lenihan Jnr (FF) | Joan Burton (Lab) | 3 seats 2002–2011 | |
| 31st | 2011 | Leo Varadkar (FG) | Brian Lenihan Jnr (FF) | Joan Burton (Lab) | Joe Higgins (SP) | 4 seats 2011–2024 |
| 31st | 2011 by-election | Leo Varadkar (FG) | Patrick Nulty (Lab) | Joan Burton (Lab) | Joe Higgins (SP) | 4 seats 2011–2024 |
| 31st | 2014 by-election | Leo Varadkar (FG) | Ruth Coppinger (SP) | Joan Burton (Lab) | Joe Higgins (SP) | 4 seats 2011–2024 |
| 32nd | 2016 | Leo Varadkar (FG) | Ruth Coppinger (AAA–PBP) | Joan Burton (Lab) | Jack Chambers (FF) | 4 seats 2011–2024 |
| 33rd | 2020 | Leo Varadkar (FG) | Paul Donnelly (SF) | Roderic O'Gorman (GP) | Jack Chambers (FF) | 4 seats 2011–2024 |
| 34th | 2024 | Emer Currie (FG) | Paul Donnelly (SF) | Roderic O'Gorman (GP) | Jack Chambers (FF) | Ruth Coppinger (PBP–S) |
