= Róisín Garvey =

Irish former politician (born 1973)

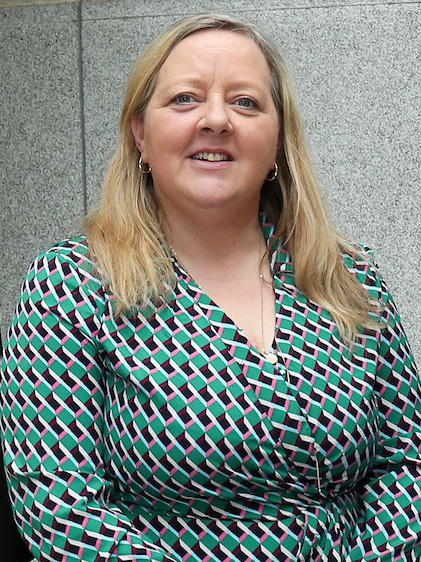
- Garvey in 2023

Senator
- In office 29 June 2020 – 31 January 2025
- Constituency: Nominated by the Taoiseach

Deputy leader of the Green Party
- In office 14 July 2024 – 13 October 2025
- Leader: Roderic O'Gorman
- Preceded by: Catherine Martin
- Succeeded by: Hazel Chu

Personal details
- Born: 5 July 1973 (age 53) County Clare, Ireland
- Party: Green Party (2019–2025)
- Children: 1
- Education: NUI Galway

Róisín Garvey (born 5 July 1973) is an Irish former Green Party politician who served as a Senator from June 2020 to January 2025, after being nominated by the Taoiseach. She was elected deputy leader of the Green Party on 14 July 2024. She resigned her position as deputy leader and party spokesperson on 13 October 2025 and left the party.

== Early life ==
Garvey grew up in Inagh and attended Coláiste Muire, Ennis and NUI Galway. Her father, Flan Garvey, was a Fianna Fáil member of Clare County Council between 1985 and 2009. Garvey formerly worked for An Taisce.

== Political career ==
She previously served as a member of Clare County Council from 2019 to 2020. In 2020 she was appointed party spokesperson on Rural Development.

Garvey was an unsuccessful Green Party candidate in the 2020 general election for the Clare constituency. A fluent Irish speaker, she represented the Greens on the Irish-language TV debate on TG4 prior to that election. She was elected to the 26th Seanad in June 2020 following a nomination by the Taoiseach, Micheál Martin as part of the coalition agreement between Fianna Fáil, Fine Gael and the Green Party and was appointed the Green Party's leader in the Seanad in December 2022.

On 24 March 2021, Garvey was one of three Green Party senators to table a motion of no confidence against party chairperson Hazel Chu, after Chu announced her candidacy in a Seanad by-election as an independent. The motion was later withdrawn at the request of then deputy leader Catherine Martin and Chu was not sanctioned for her decision.

In 2022, she opposed plans for an eight wind-turbine farm in County Clare. She said, "There are a lot of people locally who don't want it there because they already have enough of wind-turbines in the area... I have never been out demanding wind farms in my life and I don't intend to start now". An Bord Pleanála subsequently refused planning permission for the wind farm.

On 14 July 2024, Garvey won the Green Party's deputy leadership election to succeed Catherine Martin. She resigned from that position and the party fifteen months later in October 2025, also stepping down as party spokesperson for Rural and Community Development, the Gaeltacht and Gaeilge.

== Personal life ==
She has one son and five siblings.
