= Pauline O'Reilly =

Irish politician (born 1974/1975)

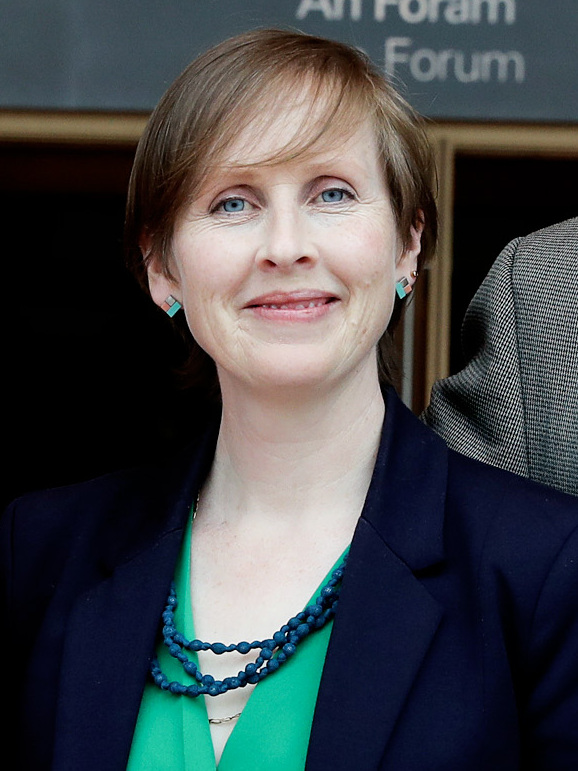
- O'Reilly in 2020

Senator
- In office 29 June 2020 – 31 January 2025
- Constituency: Labour Panel

Chair of the Green Party
- In office 16 December 2021 – 1 May 2025

Personal details
- Born: 1974/1975 (age 51–52) Dublin, Ireland
- Party: Green Party
- Spouse: Conor O'Donovan
- Children: 2
- Education: University College Dublin; Law Society of Ireland

Pauline O'Reilly (born 1974/1975) is an Irish Green Party politician who served as a Senator for the Labour Panel from June 2020 to January 2025, and was chair of the Green Party from December 2021 to May 2025.

== Early life and education ==
O'Reilly is a qualified solicitor. She is chair of the Galway Steiner National School.

== Political career ==
O'Reilly was elected to Galway City Council at the 2019 local elections.

O'Reilly stood unsuccessfully in Galway West at the 2020 general election. She won 6% of first preference votes and finished ninth in the five seat constituency.

She was elected to Seanad Éireann in 2020 as a senator for the Labour Panel. She served as Green Party spokesperson for Education and Higher Education while in the Seanad. She was the leader of the Green Party in the Seanad until December 2022.

On 24 March 2021, O'Reilly was one of three Green Party senators to table a motion of no confidence against party chair Hazel Chu, after Chu announced her candidacy in a Seanad by-election as an independent, with O'Reilly stating she does not believe it's appropriate "to run as an independent candidate and also to be a chair of a party that’s in government and is supporting government candidates". The motion was later withdrawn at the request of then deputy leader Catherine Martin and Chu was not sanctioned for her decision.

On 16 December 2021, O'Reilly was elected as Chair of the Irish Green Party, succeeding Chu. O'Reilly was re-elected to the position of party chair on 26 November 2023. She was succeeded in that position by Dublin City Councillor Janet Horner in 2025.

O'Reilly was the Green Party's candidate for the Midlands–North-West constituency at the 2024 European Parliament election. O'Reilly received 13,710 (2.0%) first preference votes but was not elected.

== Personal life ==
O'Reilly has two children and practices unschooling with them. Her husband works from home.
