= Christopher Fettes =

Teacher, farmer and founder of the Irish Green Party

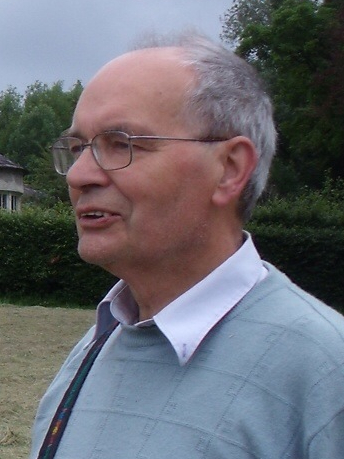

Cathaoirleach (Chairperson) of the Green Party
- In office 1981–???
- Preceded by: New Office

Personal details
- Born: Bromley, Kent, England
- Party: Green Party
- Education: Clayesmore School, Dorset
- Alma mater: Trinity College Dublin

Christopher Fettes (born 1937 in England) is the founder of the Irish Green Party.

== Biography ==
Christopher Fettes was born in Bromley, Kent, England and educated at Clayesmore School, Dorset, and in English and French at Trinity College Dublin.

In 1981, he initiated and chaired the founding meeting of the Ecology Party of Ireland, which later became the Irish Green Party. He stood unsuccessfully as a Green candidate for the European Parliament in 1984. He contested the 2002 general election and the 2011 general election in the Laois–Offaly constituency.
