= 2020 Green Party leadership election (Ireland) =

Irish political party election

- 6 June – 22 July 2020
- Turnout: 1,950 (66.7% of 2,923 eligible voters), including 10 spoiled votes (0.5%), leaving a total valid poll of 1,940
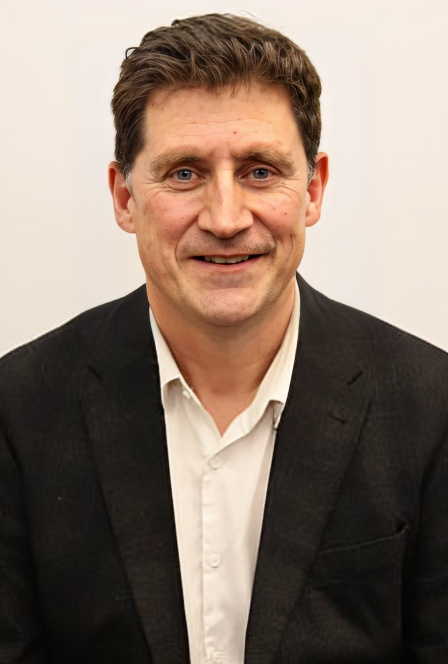

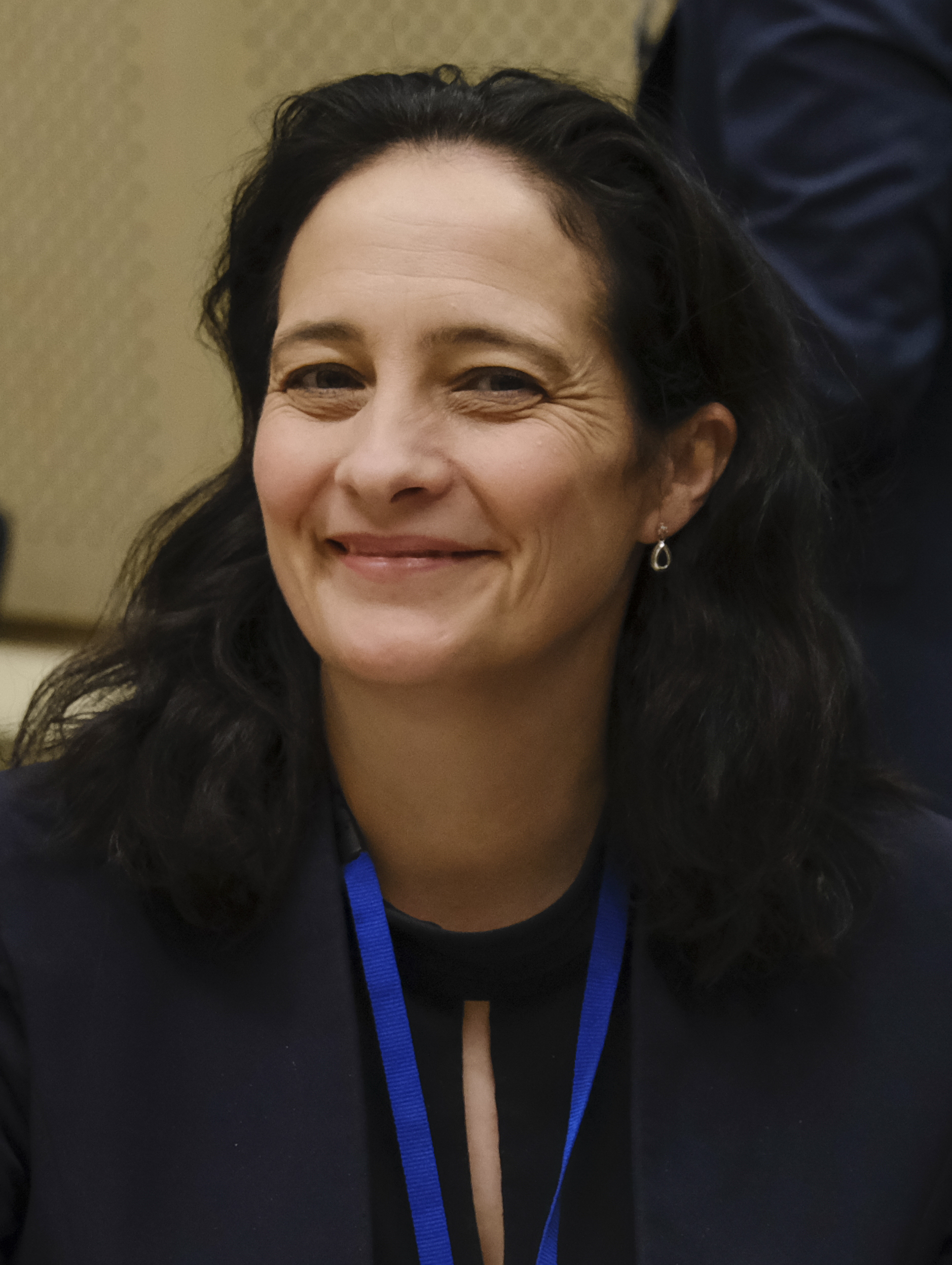
Candidate	Eamon Ryan	Catherine Martin
Popular vote	994	946
Percentage	51.24%	48.76%
Leader before election
Eamon Ryan
Elected Leader
Eamon Ryan

The 2020 Green Party leadership election was a leadership election within Ireland's Green Party. The election was won by Eamon Ryan who received 51% of the votes cast and retained his position as leader.

== Background ==
The constitution of the Green Party mandates there must always be a leadership contest within the party within six months of a general election. The 2020 Irish general election triggered this election.

Eamon Ryan and Catherine Martin have been Leader and Deputy Leader of the Green party, respectively, since 2011. Ryan was credited with rebuilding the Green Party after it lost all representation in the Oireachtas in 2011. Ryan and Martin were the first two Greens to win back seats as Teachtai Dála at the 2016 Irish general election and in the 2020 Irish general election, the party had its best result ever when it secured 12 seats.

In the prelude to the leadership contest were the government formation talks between Fianna Fáil, Fine Gael and the Green Party as they put together the Government of the 33rd Dáil. Catherine Martin served as the Green's lead negotiator in those talks and was considered to have stood firm for the Greens' demands.

== Procedure ==
Candidates must receive 50 nominations by party members. All members of the party have a vote, provided they have been a paid-up party member, including members from Northern Ireland.

Postal ballot papers were sent to Green party members on 1 July and the closing date for returning votes was 22 July. The results were announced on 23 July 2020.

== Candidates ==
Candidate	Born	Political office	Announced
Eamon Ryan	28 July 1963 (age 62); Dundrum, Dublin	Leader of the Green Party (2011–present); Minister for the Environment, Climate and Communications (2020–Present); Minister for Transport (2020–Present); Minister for Communications, Energy and Natural Resources (2007–11); TD for Dublin South (2002–2011); TD for Dublin Bay South (2016–Present)	
Catherine Martin	7 December 1972 (age 53); Monaghan Town, County Monaghan	Deputy Leader of the Green Party (2011–present); Minister for Tourism, Culture, Arts, Gaeltacht, Sport and Media (2020–Present); TD for Dublin Rathdown (2016–Present)	6 June 2020

Within the Green Party, Martin's candidacy was seen to represent the views of younger, more radical Green Party members who did not wish to enter into coalition with Fine Gael or Fianna Fáil, in contrast to the leadership of Eamon Ryan which was seen to represent the moderate "old guard" who are open to working with those parties. There was also the view amongst some Green Party members that Martin would be a sterner, more hardnosed leader than the more relaxed and approachable Ryan, and that Martin's more aggressive approach would be needed to safeguard the party against Fine Gael and Fianna Fáil backsliding on promises to them. Supporters of Ryan argued that his warm manner is what helped him build relations both inside and outside of the party, and this would be important in holding the three parties together in government as well as settling the party down after divisive issues such as entering government and the leadership contest itself.

== Debates ==
4 internal debates were held over the course of election. Due to the COVID-19 pandemic, the debates were held online via Zoom conferences. One debate was held for each of the Republic of Ireland's European Parliament constituencies, and a fourth debate for members from Northern Ireland. Over the course of debates, Ryan generally presented himself as the experienced and dependable choice while Martin presented herself as more able to communicate with rural Ireland and build the party's support there, as well as stressing the importance of pursuing Social Justice. Both candidates stressed they did not want the contest to divide the party, and regardless of who won, the leader would need to heal any wounds within the party and rebuild the party's cohesiveness.

Date	Region	Reference
7 July 2020	South	
11 July 2020	Dublin	
14 July 2020	Midlands–North-West	
14 July 2020	Northern Ireland	

== Result ==
Eamon Ryan was declared the victor on 23 July 2020. The contest was considered to have been especially close, with only 48 votes separating the two candidates. Ryan acknowledged this, stating "It is a really close result. The numbers could have gone either way". Ryan declared his intention going forward was to "help this party and our country and our people through this remarkably challenging period." Martin thanked her supporters and stated her belief that Ryan would be able to reunite and rebuild the party following months of tension caused by the government formation talks and the leadership contest. Ryan thanked Martin for conducting a civil contest.
