= Green Party (Ireland) =

Irish political party

Green Party Comhaontas Glas
- Leader: Roderic O'Gorman
- Deputy leader: Hazel Chu
- Northern Ireland leader: Mal O'Hara
- Chairperson: Janet Horner
- Founders: Christopher Fettes; Roger Garland; Máire Mullarney
- Founded: 3 December 1981; 44 years ago (as Ecology Party of Ireland)
- Headquarters: 32 Nassau Street, Dublin, Ireland
- Youth wing: Young Greens
- Membership (September 2025): ▼ ≈3,200
- Ideology: Green politics Pro-Europeanism
- Political position: Centre-left to left-wing
- European affiliation: European Green Party
- European Parliament group: Greens–European Free Alliance
- International affiliation: Global Greens
- Northern Ireland affiliate: Green Party Northern Ireland
- Colours: Green
- Dáil Éireann: 1 / 174
- Seanad Éireann: 1 / 60
- Local government in the Republic of Ireland: 23 / 949
- Local government in Northern Ireland: 5 / 462

Website
- greenparty.ie

The Green Party (Irish: Comhaontas Glas, lit. 'Green Alliance') is a green political party that operates in the Republic of Ireland and Northern Ireland. It holds a pro-European stance. It was founded as the Ecology Party of Ireland in 1981 by Dublin teacher Christopher Fettes. The party became the Green Alliance in 1983 and adopted its current English language name in 1987 while the Irish name was kept unchanged. The current leader of the party is Roderic O'Gorman, the current deputy leader is Hazel Chu, and the cathaoirleach (chairperson) is Janet Horner. Green Party candidates have been elected to most levels of representation: local government (in both the Republic of Ireland and Northern Ireland), Dáil Éireann, the Northern Ireland Assembly, and the European Parliament.

The Green Party first entered the Dáil in 1989. It has participated in the Irish government twice, from 2007 to 2011 as junior partner in a coalition with Fianna Fáil, and from 2020 to 2024 in a coalition with Fianna Fáil and Fine Gael. Following the first period in government, the party suffered a wipeout in the February 2011 election, losing all six of its TDs. In the February 2016 election, it returned to the Dáil with two seats. Following this, Grace O'Sullivan was elected to the Seanad on 26 April that year of 2016 and Joe O'Brien was elected to Dáil Éireann in the 2019 Dublin Fingal by-election. In the 2020 general election, the party had its best result ever, securing 12 TDs and becoming the fourth largest party in the 33rd Dáil before losing all but one seat in the 2024 general election.

== History ==
=== Early years and first rise ===
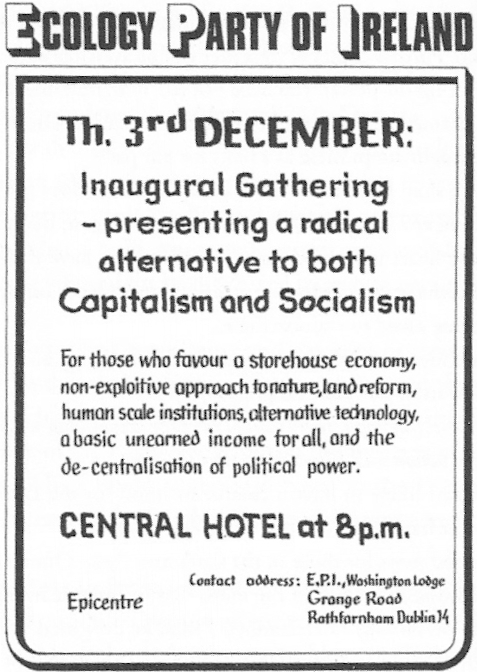
Poster advertising the first ever meeting of the "Ecology Party of Ireland"

The Green Party began life as the Ecology Party in 1981, with Christopher Fettes serving as the party's first chairperson. The party's first public appearance was modest: the event announced that they would be contesting the November 1982 general election, and was attended by their seven election candidates, 20 party supporters, and one singular journalist. Fettes had opened the meeting by noting the party didn't expect to win any seats. Willy Clingan, the journalist present, recalled that "The Ecology Party introduced its seven election candidates at the nicest and most endearingly honest press conference of the whole campaign". The Ecology party took 0.2% of first preference votes that year, and an average of 1.3% where it stood candidates.

Following a name change to the Green Alliance, it contested the 1984 European elections, with party founder Roger Garland winning 1.9% in the Dublin constituency. At this time the party's organisation was highly decentralised, with the Alliance being structured as an association of local groups, each with its own constitution, and practiced consensus decision-making. It also developed joint policies on Northern Ireland with the UK Green Party, including a Bill of Rights to be enforced by a supra-national authority, regional devolution in both Ireland and Britain and use of multiple-choice referendums to foster compromise.

The following year, it won its first election when Marcus Counihan was elected to Killarney Urban District Council at the 1985 local elections, buoyed by the party having won 5,200 first preference votes in Dublin in the European elections the previous year. The party nationally ran 34 candidates and won 0.6% of the vote nationwide, and an average of 2.3% where it stood candidates. In the 1987 Irish general election the Greens stood in nine constituencies, six in Dublin, winning 0.4% of first preference votes nationwide and an average of 1.8% where it stood.

The party continued to struggle until the 1989 general election when the Green Party (as it was now named) won its first seat in Dáil Éireann, when Roger Garland was elected in Dublin South. Garland lost his seat at the 1992 general election, while Trevor Sargent gained a seat in Dublin North. In the 1994 European election, Patricia McKenna topped the poll in the Dublin constituency and Nuala Ahern won a seat in Leinster. They retained their European Parliament seats in the 1999 European election, although the party lost five councillors in local elections held that year despite an increase in its vote. At the 1997 general election, the party gained a seat when John Gormley won a Dáil seat in Dublin South-East.

At the 2002 general election, the party made a breakthrough, getting six Teachtaí Dála (TDs) elected to the Dáil with 4% of the national vote. However, in the 2004 European election, the party lost both of its European Parliament seats. In the 2004 local elections, it increased its number of councillors at county level from eight to 18 (out of 883) and at town council level from five to 14 (out of 744).

The party gained its first representation in the Northern Ireland Assembly in 2007, the Green Party in Northern Ireland having become a regional branch of the party the previous year.

=== First term in government ===
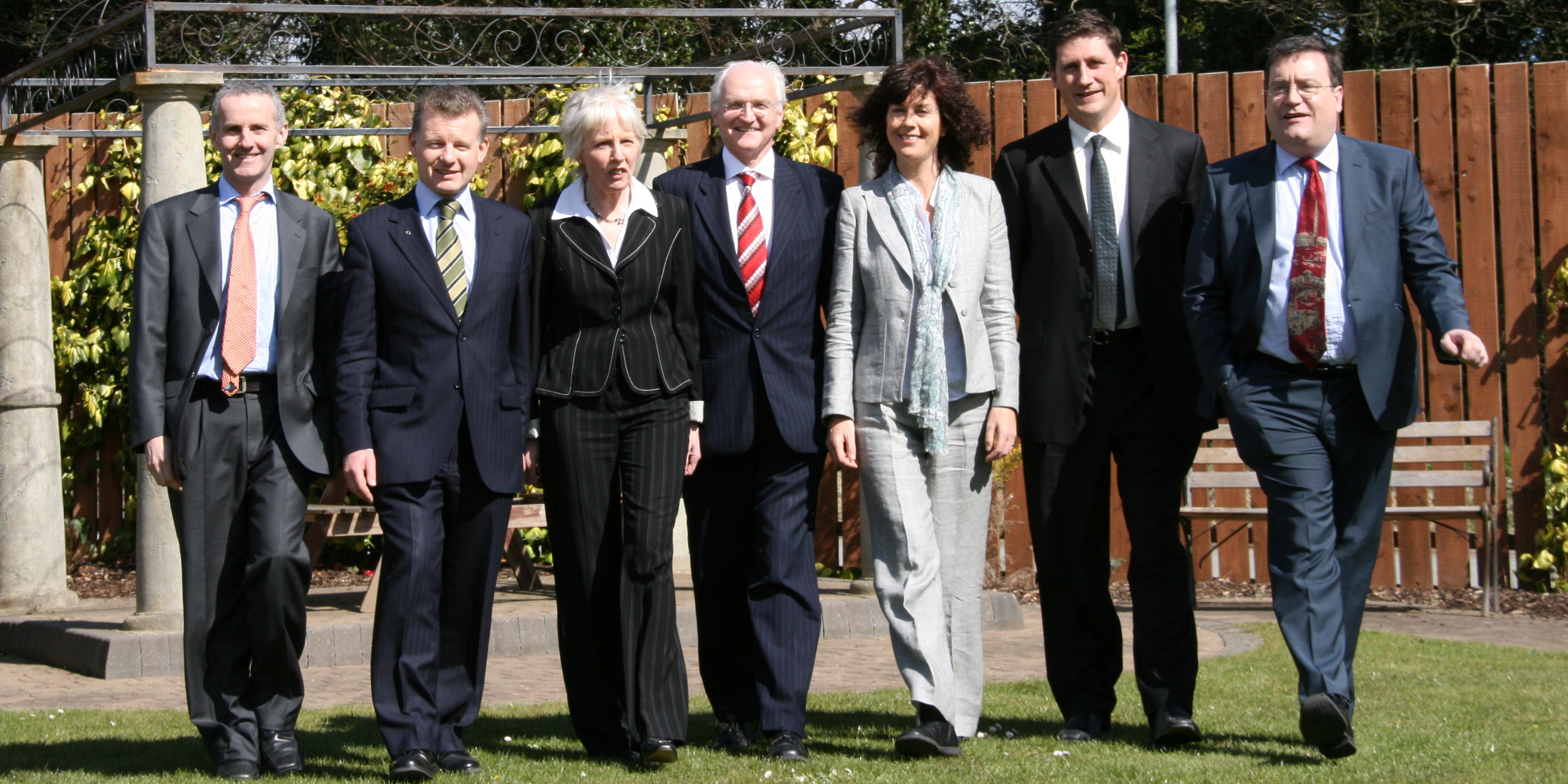
The Greens' parliamentary party in 2008

The Green Party entered government for the first time after the 2007 general election, held on 24 May. Although its share of first-preference votes increased at the election, the party failed to increase the number of TDs returned. Mary White won a seat for the first time in Carlow–Kilkenny; however, Dan Boyle lost his seat in Cork South-Central. The party had approached the 2007 general election on an independent platform, not ruling any out coalition partners while expressing its preference for an alternative to the outgoing coalition of Fianna Fáil and the Progressive Democrats. Neither the outgoing government nor an alternative of Fine Gael, Labour and the Green Party had sufficient seats to form a majority. Fine Gael ruled out a coalition arrangement with Sinn Féin, opening the way for Green Party negotiations with Fianna Fáil.

Some saw the idea of going into coalition with Fianna Fáil as a "sell-out". Before the negotiations began, Ciarán Cuffe TD wrote on his blog that "a deal with Fianna Fáil would be a deal with the devil… and [the Green Party would be] decimated as a Party". After protracted negotiations, a draft programme for government was agreed to between the Greens and Fianna Fáil. Early Green demands included the introduction of legislation on corporate donations, a moratorium on using public land to build private hospitals, and altering the route of the M3 motorway near the Hill of Tara; none of these demands appeared in the final government programme. On 13 June 2007, Green members at the Mansion House in Dublin voted 86% in favour (441 to 67; with 2 spoilt votes) of entering coalition with Fianna Fáil. The following day, the six Green Party TDs voted for the re-election of Bertie Ahern as Taoiseach. New party leader John Gormley was appointed as Minister for the Environment, Heritage and Local Government and Eamon Ryan was appointed as Minister for Communications, Energy and Natural Resources. Trevor Sargent was appointed as Minister of State at the Department of Agriculture, Fisheries and Food with responsibility for Food and Horticulture.

Before its entry into government, the Green Party had been a vocal supporter of the Shell to Sea movement, the campaign to reroute the M3 motorway away from Tara, and (to a lesser extent) the campaign to end United States military use of Shannon Airport. After the party entered government there were no substantive changes in government policy on these issues, which meant that Eamon Ryan oversaw the Corrib gas project while he was in office. The Green Party had, at its 2007 annual conference, made an inquiry into the irregularities surrounding the project (see Corrib gas controversy) a precondition of entering government, but changed its stance during post-election negotiations with Fianna Fáil.

The 2008 budget did not include a carbon levy on fuels such as petrol, diesel and home heating oil, which the Green Party had sought before the election. A carbon levy was, however, introduced in the 2010 Budget. The 2008 budget did include a separate carbon budget announced by Gormley, which introduced new energy efficiency tax credit, a ban on incandescent bulbs from January 2009, a tax scheme incentivising commuters' purchases of bicycles and a new scale of vehicle registration tax based on carbon emissions.

At a special convention on whether to support the Treaty of Lisbon on 19 January 2008, the party voted 63.5% in favour of supporting the Treaty; this fell short of the party's two-thirds majority requirement for policy issues. As a result, the Green Party did not have an official campaign in the first Lisbon Treaty referendum, although individual members were involved on different sides. The referendum did not pass in 2008, and following the Irish government's negotiation with EU member states of additional legal guarantees and assurances, the Green Party held another special convention meeting in Dublin on 18 July 2009 to decide its position on the second Lisbon referendum. Precisely two-thirds of party members present voted to campaign for a 'Yes' in the referendum. This was the first time in the party's history that it had campaigned in favour of a European treaty.

The government's response to the post-2008 banking crisis significantly affected the party's support, and it suffered at the 2009 local elections, returning with only three County Council seats in total and losing its entire traditional Dublin base, with the exception of a Town Council seat in Balbriggan.

Déirdre de Búrca, one of two Green senators nominated by Taoiseach Bertie Ahern in 2007, resigned from the party and her seat in 2010, in part owing to the party's inability to secure her a job in the European Commission. On 23 February 2010, Trevor Sargent resigned as Minister of State for Food and Horticulture owing to allegations over contacting Gardaí about a criminal case involving a constituent, with Ciarán Cuffe being appointed as his replacement the following March. By 2010, opinion polls showed strong support for an immediate election with the Greens polling at just 2%.

The Green Party supported the passage of legislation for EC–ECB–IMF financial support for Ireland's bank bailout. On 19 January, the party derailed Taoiseach Brian Cowen's plans to reshuffle his cabinet when it refused to endorse Cowen's intended replacement ministers, forcing Cowen to redistribute the vacant portfolios among incumbent ministers. The Greens were angered at not having been consulted about this effort, and went as far as to threaten to pull out of the coalition unless Cowen set a firm date for an election due that spring. He ultimately set the date for 11 March.

On 23 January 2011, the Green Party met with Cowen following his resignation as leader of senior coalition partner Fianna Fáil the previous afternoon. The Green Party then announced it was breaking off the coalition and going into opposition with immediate effect. Ministers Gormley and Ryan resigned as cabinet ministers, and Cuffe and White resigned as Ministers of State. Green Party leader John Gormley said at a press conference announcing the withdrawal:

For a very long time we in the Green Party have stood back in the hope that Fianna Fáil could resolve persistent doubts about their party leadership. A definitive resolution of this has not yet been possible. And our patience has reached an end.

In almost four years in Government, from 2007 to 2011, the Green Party contributed to the passage of civil partnership for same-sex couples, the introduction of major planning reform, a major increase in renewable energy output, progressive budgets, and a nationwide scheme of home insulation retrofitting.

=== Wipeout, recovery, and second government term ===
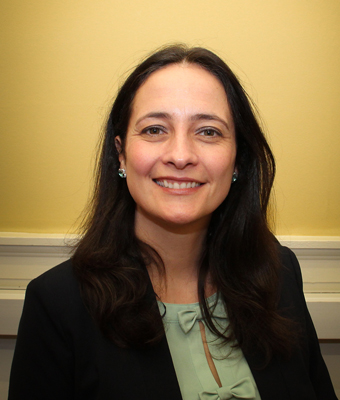
Catherine Martin became the deputy leader of the party in 2011

==== Fallout from the 2011 general election ====
The party lost all of its six TDs at the 2011 general election, including former Ministers John Gormley and Eamon Ryan. Three of their six TDs lost their deposits. The party's share of the vote fell below 2%, meaning that they could not reclaim election expenses, and their lack of parliamentary representation led to the ending of state funding for the party. The party candidates in the 2011 election to the Seanad were Dan Boyle and Niall Ó Brolcháin; neither was elected, and as a result, for the first time since 1989 the Green Party had no representatives in the Oireachtas.

In the aftermath of the wipeout Eamon Ryan was elected as party leader on 27 May 2011, succeeding John Gormley, while Catherine Martin was later appointed the deputy leader of the party.

==== 2016 to 2019 electoral successes ====
At the 2016 general election Ryan and Martin gained two seats in the Dáil while Grace O'Sullivan picked up a seat in the Seanad. In doing so the Green party became the first Irish political party to lose all their seats in a general election but come back and win seats in a subsequent election. The Greens continued to pick up momentum in 2019, performing quite well during the concurrent 2019 local elections and 2019 European Parliament election while in November that same year the party saw Pippa Hackett win a seat in the Seanad and Joe O'Brien bring home the party's first ever by-election win in the 2019 Dublin Fingal by-election.

==== Return to government ====
At the 2020 general election, the party had its best result ever, winning 7.1% of the first-preference votes and returning 12 TDs, an increase of ten from the last election. It became the fourth-largest party in the Dáil and entered government in coalition with Fianna Fáil and Fine Gael. Ryan, Martin and Roderic O'Gorman were appointed as cabinet ministers, with four Green Ministers of State. Clare Bailey, the leader of the Green Party in Northern Ireland, was amongst a number of Green members who stood against the coalition. She said it proposed the "most fiscally conservative arrangements in a generation" and that "the economic and finances behind this deal will really lead to some of the most vulnerable being hit the hardest", as well as it not doing enough on climate and social justice. She also said the deal "fails to deliver on our promise to tackle homelessness and provide better healthcare", "represents an unjust recovery" and "sets out an inadequate and vague pathway towards climate action". The party returned two senators at the 2020 Seanad election, with a further two senators nominated by the Taoiseach, Micheál Martin bringing the total party representation in the Oireachtas to 16. In July 2020, Eamon Ryan retained his leadership of the party with a narrow leadership election victory over Catherine Martin in the 2020 Green Party leadership election by 994 votes to 946, a margin of 48 votes.

==== Internal disputes ====
Despite the success at the general election, the party found itself dogged by infighting and resignations. Saoirse McHugh, a candidate in the 2019 European elections, 2020 general election and the 2020 Seanad election, resigned from the party upon the Greens entering government with Fine Gael and Fianna Fáil, parties she believed would damage public enthusiasm for environmentalist policies by pairing them with "socially regressive" policies. Over the course of 2020, four councillors as well as both the leader of the Young Greens and the leader of the Queer Greens left the party, all citing either bullying within the party or dissatisfaction with the coalition and its policies as the cause. Amongst the resignations were councillors Lorna Bogue and Liam Sinclair, who subsequently formed a new left-wing green party called Rabharta in June 2021.

Infighting continued in 2021 when the party Cathaoirleach Hazel Chu, the Lord Mayor of Dublin, launched a campaign to run for the 2021 Seanad by-elections with the support of six members of the Green Party Parliamentary Party, but without official backing from the party. Senators Pippa Hackett, Pauline O'Reilly and Róisín Garvey tabled a motion of no confidence in Chu as Cathaoirleach of the party. Deputy leader, Catherine Martin urged the senators to withdraw the motion and it was later replaced with a motion calling for Chu to temporarily step aside from the position as party chair for the duration of the election. This was passed by 11 votes to five at a meeting of the Parliamentary Party. The Executive Council of the party, however, decided not to follow the Parliamentary Party's decision and Chu remained in the position of Cathaoirleach until the end of her term in December 2021. Chu ran in the 2022 Dublin University by-election and was commended by the party for "championing climate action and inclusion".

In May 2022, Green TDs Neasa Hourigan and Patrick Costello were suspended from the party for six months after they went against the party whip and voted for an opposition motion calling for the new National Maternity Hospital to be built on land wholly owned by the state. Hourigan was suspended again in March 2023, this time for 15 months, after she voted against the government on the issue of ending a ban on evictions.

==== Notable achievements ====
The Climate Action and Low Carbon Development (Amendment) Act 2021 was one of the Greens' flagship policies. The law enacted a legally binding path to net zero emissions by 2050. Five-year carbon budgets produced by the Climate Change Advisory Council will dictate the path to carbon neutrality, with the aim of the first two budgets creating a 51% reduction by 2030. The five-year budgets will not be legally binding.

The party also secured significantly increased budgets for active and sustainable travel including greenways and cycle lanes, the LocalLink rural bus network, decreases in public transport fares, a new forestry programme, increased incentives for solar and for retrofit, and the recognition of the circular economy. Outside of the core climate and environmental policies the party also implemented a pilot scheme for a basic income for the arts sector and large cuts in childcare costs.

In June 2024, the European Union Environment Council approved the Nature Restoration Law which was described as "among the EU's biggest environmental policies". The role of Eamon Ryan in convincing other ministers to support the law was considered to be pivotal to its success.

==== 2024 onwards ====
At the 2024 local elections, the party lost almost half of its council seats across the country, although it topped the poll in four local electoral areas in Dublin City. At the 2024 European Parliament elections, Ciarán Cuffe and Grace O'Sullivan both lost their seats, while in the Limerick mayoral election, the party's candidate, Brian Leddin, won 2.89% of the vote and was eliminated on the fifth count.

On 18 June 2024, Eamon Ryan announced his resignation as party leader. Ryan also announced that he would not be seeking re-election as a TD for Dublin Bay South at the next general election. Later the same day Catherine Martin announced her resignation as deputy leader and would not be seeking the leadership role. On 19 June, Roderic O'Gorman and Senator Pippa Hackett both announced that they would be seeking nominations for the leadership position. On 8 July, O'Gorman was narrowly elected over Hackett with 51.89% of the vote. On 14 July, Senator Róisín Garvey narrowly defeated Neasa Hourigan with 51% of the vote to become deputy leader.

At the 2024 general election the party retained one of their twelve seats, with party leader Roderic O'Gorman being elected. The party won 3% of the vote. In the 2025 Seanad election, former TD and Minister of State Malcolm Noonan was elected to the 27th Seanad topping the poll on the Agricultural Panel.

In the 2025 Irish presidential election the party endorsed the campaign of Catherine Connolly, joining a broad left alliance in support of her candidacy which included Social Democrats, People Before Profit, Labour, Sinn Féin and several left-leaning independents. In October 2025, former TD Brian Leddin quit the party, citing his unhappiness at the decision to endorse Connolly. Also in October 2025, Róisín Garvey resigned her position as deputy leader of the party and quit the party.

In January 2026, Hazel Chu was elected deputy leader of the party.

== Ideology and policies ==
The Green Party has seven "founding principles", which are:

- The impact of society on the environment should not be ecologically disruptive.
- All political, social and economic decisions should be taken at the lowest effective level.
- As caretakers of the Earth, we have the responsibility to pass it on in a fit and healthy state.
- Society should be guided by self-reliance and co-operation at all levels.
- Conservation of resources is vital to a sustainable society.
- The need for world peace overrides national and commercial interests.
- The poverty of two-thirds of the world's family demands a redistribution of the world's resources.

Broadly, these founding principles reflect the "four pillars" of green politics observed by the majority of Green Parties internationally: ecological wisdom, social justice, grassroots democracy, and nonviolence. They also reflect the six guiding principles of the Global Greens, which also includes a respect for diversity as a principle.

While strongly associated with environmentalist policies, the party also has policies covering all other key areas. These include protection of the Irish language, lowering the voting age in Ireland to 16, and support for universal healthcare. The party also advocates that terminally ill people should have the right to legally choose assisted dying, stating "provisions should apply only to those with a terminal illness which is likely to result in death within six months". It also states that "such a right would only apply where the person has a clear and settled intention to end their own life which is proved by making, and signing, a written declaration to that effect. Such a declaration must be countersigned by two qualified doctors".

The party supports increasing the share of renewable energy sources used in Ireland and supports a carbon dividend. The Green Party wants to invest in sustainable transport infrastructure, making travel via public transport, walking and cycling easier, including advocating for pedestrian-friendly city centres. The party also supports "at least 10% tree canopy in every city, town, and suburb, and a publicly accessible woodland within 5km of every large town and city". The party's policies on agriculture include wanting 20% of Irish farms to be organic and to "encourage diversification from a mostly animal-based model to one that produces grains, vegetables, fruit, nuts and plant-based products". In regards to homelessness, the Green Party supports a Housing First approach. The party also supports a universal basic income for all residents of Ireland.

=== Internal factions ===
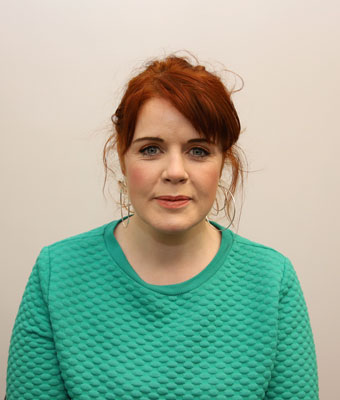
Neasa Hourigan was a founding member of the Just Transition Greens

As other like-minded green parties, it has eco-socialist/green left and more moderate factions. In parallel to other Green Parties in Europe, the 1980s and 1990s saw a division within the Irish Green Party between two factions; the "Realists" (nicknamed the "Realos") and the "Fundamentalists (nicknamed the "Fundies"). The 'Realists' advocated taking a pragmatic approach to politics, which would mean having to accept some compromises on policy in order to get party members elected and into government in order to enact change. The 'Fundamentalists' advocated more radical policies and rejected appeals for pragmatism, citing that the looming effects of Climate Change would leave no time for compromise. Following a national convention in 1998 which saw a realist majority of members defeat a minority of fundamentalist members on a number of votes, and the party subsequently enter government for the first time in 2007, the factionalism of the 'Realists vs the Fundamentalists' was seen to have wilted away with the 'Realists' becoming the ascendent faction. However, in some respects, the division only laid dormant.

Following the 2019 local elections and the 2020 general election, the party had more elected representatives than ever before as well as its highest ever membership. On 22 July 2020, several prominent members of the party formed the "Just Transition Greens", an affiliate group within the party with a green left/eco-socialist outlook, who have the objective of moving the party towards policies based on the concept of a "Just Transition". During the 2020 Green Party leadership election, a significant aspect of the candidacy of Catherine Martin was that it was suggested that Martin could better represent the views of these individuals within the party than the incumbent Eamon Ryan.

== Organisation ==
The National Executive Committee is the organising committee of the party. It comprises the party leader Roderic O'Gorman, the deputy leader Róisín Garvey, the Cathaoirleach Janet Horner, the National Coordinator, the General Secretary (in a non-voting role), a Young Greens representative, the Treasurer and ten members elected annually at the party convention.

=== Leadership ===
==== Party leader ====
Name	Portrait	Period	Constituency
No leader		1981–2001	N/A
Trevor Sargent		2001–2007	Dublin North
John Gormley		2007–2011	Dublin South-East
Eamon Ryan		2011–2024	Dublin South; Dublin Bay South
Roderic O'Gorman		2024–present	Dublin West

==== Deputy leader ====
Name	Portrait	Period	Constituency
Mary White		2001–2011	Carlow–Kilkenny (2007–2011)
Catherine Martin		2011–2024	Dublin Rathdown (2016–2024)
Róisín Garvey		2024–2025	Senator Nominated by Taoiseach (2016–2025)
Hazel Chu		2026–present	Dublin Bay South (Dublin City Councillor)

==== Cathaoirleach (Chairperson) ====
Name	Portrait	Period
John Gormley		2002–2007
Dan Boyle		2007–2011
Roderic O'Gorman		2011–2019
Hazel Chu		2019–2021
Pauline O'Reilly		2021–2025
Janet Horner		2025–present

Note: Although Christopher Fettes chaired the party initially, the position of Cathaoirleach was not created until 2002.

=== Leadership organisation ===
The party did not have a national leader until 2001. At a special "Leadership Convention" in Kilkenny on 6 October 2001, Trevor Sargent was elected the first official leader of the Green Party while Mary White was elected deputy leader. Sargent was re-elected to his position in 2003 and again in 2005. The party's constitution requires that a leadership election be held within six months of a general election.

Sargent resigned the leadership in the wake of the 2007 general election to the 30th Dáil. During the campaign, Sargent had promised that he would not lead the party into Government with Fianna Fáil. At the election the party retained six Dáil seats, making it the most likely partner for Fianna Fáil. Sargent and the party negotiated a coalition government; at the 12 June 2007 membership meeting to approve the agreement, he announced his resignation as leader.

In the subsequent leadership election, John Gormley became the new leader on 17 July 2007, defeating Patricia McKenna by 478 votes to 263. Mary White was subsequently re-elected as the deputy Leader. Gormley served as Minister for the Environment, Heritage and Local Government from July 2007 until the Green Party's exit from government in January 2011.

Following the election defeats of 2011, Gormley announced his intention not to seek another term as Green Party leader. Eamon Ryan was elected as the new party leader, over party colleagues Phil Kearney and Cllr Malcolm Noonan in a postal ballot election of party members in May 2011. Monaghan-based former councillor Catherine Martin defeated Down-based Dr John Barry and former Senator Mark Dearey to the post of deputy leader on 11 June 2011 during the party's annual convention. Roderic O'Gorman was elected party chairperson.

The Green Party lost all its Dáil seats in the 2011 general election. Party Chairman Dan Boyle and Déirdre de Búrca were nominated by the Taoiseach to Seanad Éireann after the formation of the Fianna Fáil–Progressive Democrats–Green Party government in 2007, and Niall Ó Brolcháin was elected in December 2009. De Búrca resigned in February 2010, and was replaced by Mark Dearey. Neither Boyle nor O'Brolchain was re-elected to Seanad Éireann in the Seanad election of 2011, leaving the Green Party without Oireachtas representation until the 2016 general election, in which it regained two Dáil seats.

Ryan's leadership was challenged by deputy leader Catherine Martin in 2020 after the 2020 government formation; he narrowly won a poll of party members, 994 votes (51.2%) to 946.

=== Irish and European politics ===
The Green Party is organised throughout the island of Ireland, with regional structures in both the Republic of Ireland and Northern Ireland. The Green Party Northern Ireland voted to become a regional partner of the Green Party in Ireland in 2005 at its annual convention, and again in a postal ballot in March 2006. Brian Wilson, formerly a councillor for the Alliance Party, won the Green Party's first seat in the Northern Ireland Assembly in the 2007 election. Steven Agnew later held that seat from the 2011 election until his resignation in September 2019.

== Election results ==
=== Dáil Éireann ===
Election	Leader	FPv	%	Seats	%	±	Dáil	Government
Nov. 1982	None	3,716	0.2 (#6)	0 / 166	—N/a	New	24th	No seats 19th government (FG-Lab majority)
1987	None	7,159	0.4 (#8)	0 / 166	—N/a	Steady	25th	No seats 20th government (FF minority)
1989	None	24,827	1.5 (#6)	1 / 166	0.6 (#6)	▲1	26th	Opposition; 21st, 22nd government (FF-PD minority)
1992	None	24,110	1.4 (#7)	1 / 166	0.6 (#6)	Steady	27th	Opposition; 23rd government (FF-Lab majority)
1992	None	24,110	1.4 (#7)	1 / 166	0.6 (#6)	Steady	27th	Opposition; 24th government (FG-Lab-DL majority)
1997	None	49,323	2.8 (#5)	2 / 166	1.2 (#5)	▲1	28th	Opposition; 25th government (FF-PD minority)
2002	Trevor Sargent	71,470	3.8 (#6)	6 / 166	3.6 (#5)	▲4	29th	Opposition; 26th government (FF-PD majority)
2007	Trevor Sargent	96,936	4.7 (#5)	6 / 166	3.6 (#4)	Steady	30th	Government; 27th, 28th government (FF-GP-PD majority)
2011	John Gormley	41,039	1.8 (#5)	0 / 166	—N/a	▼6	31st	No seats 29th government (FG-Lab supermajority)
2016	Eamon Ryan	56,999	2.7 (#8)	2 / 158	1.3 (#8)	▲2	32nd	Opposition; 30th, 31st government (FG-Ind minority)
2020	Eamon Ryan	155,695	7.1 (#4)	12 / 160	7.5 (#4)	▲10	33rd	Government; 32nd, 33rd, 34th government (FF-FG-GP majority)
2024	Roderic O'Gorman	66,911	3.0 (#8)	1 / 174	0.6 (#8)	▼11	34th	Opposition; 35th government (FF-FG-Ind majority)

=== Presidential elections ===
Election	Nominee	Party	Alliance	1st	Final
1983	—N/a				
1990	Mary Robinson	LAB	Labour; Worker's Party	38.9%	51.9%
1997	Adi Roche	LAB	Labour; Democratic Left	7.0%	—N/a
2004	Mary McAleese	IND	List: Fianna Fáil; Fine Gael; Progressive Democrats; Labour; Sinn Féin	Unopposed	
2011	—N/a				
2018	Michael D. Higgins	IND	List: Fianna Fáil; Fine Gael; Social Democrats; Labour	55.8%	—N/a
2025	Catherine Connolly	IND	List: Sinn Féin; Social Democrats; PBP–Solidarity; Labour; 100% Redress; Independents	63.6%	—N/a

=== Local elections ===
Election	±	Seats won	First-pref. votes	%
1985	Steady	None	7,446	0.5%
1991	▲13	13	32,950	2.4%
1999	▼5	8	35,742	2.5%
2004	▲10	18	71,052	3.9%
2009	▼15	3	44,152	2.3%
2014	▲9	12	27,168	1.6%
2019	▲37	49	96,315	5.6%
2024	▼26	23	66,684	3.6%

=== Devolved Northern Ireland legislatures ===
Election	Body	Leader	1st pref votes	%	Seats	±	Government
1996	Forum	None	3,647	0.5 (#10)	0 / 110	Steady	No seats
1998	Assembly	None	710	0.1 (#18)	0 / 108	Steady	No seats
2003	Assembly	None	2,688	0.4 (#11)	0 / 108	Steady	No seats
2007	Assembly	None	11,985	1.7 (#7)	1 / 108	▲1	Opposition
2011	Assembly	Steven Agnew	6,031	0.9 (#7)	1 / 108	Steady	Opposition
2016	Assembly	Steven Agnew	18,718	2.7 (#7)	2 / 108	▲1	Opposition
2017	Assembly	Steven Agnew	18,527	2.3 (#7)	2 / 90	Steady	Opposition
2022	Assembly	Clare Bailey	16,433	1.9 (#7)	0 / 90	▼2	No seats

=== Westminster ===
Election	Seats (in NI)	±	Position	Total votes	% (in NI)	% (in UK)	Government
1983	0 / 17	Steady	None	451	0.1%	0.0%	No Seats
1987	0 / 17	Steady	None	281	0.0%	0.0%	No Seats
1997	0 / 18	Steady	None	539	0.1%	0.0%	No Seats
2010	0 / 18	Steady	None	3,542	0.5%	0.0%	No Seats
2015	0 / 18	Steady	None	6,822	1.0%	0.0%	No Seats
2017	0 / 18	Steady	None	7,452	0.9%	0.0%	No Seats
2019	0 / 18	Steady	None	1,996	0.2%	0.0%	No Seats
2024	0 / 18	Steady	None	8,692	1.1%	0.0%	No Seats

=== European Parliament (Republic of Ireland seats only) ===
Election	Leader	1st pref Votes	%	Seats	+/−	EP Group
1984	None	5,242	0.47 (#7)	0 / 15	New	−
1989	None	61,041	3.74 (#6)	0 / 15	0	−
1994	None	90,046	7.92 (#4)	2 / 15	▲2	G
1999	None	93,100	6.69 (#4)	2 / 15	0	Greens/EFA
2004	Trevor Sargent	76,917	4.32 (#5)	0 / 13	▼2	−
2009	John Gormley	34,585	1.89 (#7)	0 / 12	0	−
2014	Eamon Ryan	81,458	4.92 (#5)	0 / 11	0	−
2019	Eamon Ryan	190,814	11.37 (#4)	2 / 13	▲2	Greens/EFA
2024	Eamon Ryan	93,575	5.36 (#4)	0 / 14	▼2	−

=== Seanad elections ===
Election	Seats	+/–
1993	0 / 60	Steady
1997	0 / 60	Steady
2002	0 / 60	Steady
2007	0 / 60	Steady
2011	0 / 60	▼3 (Note: The party had three senators by the end of the 23rd Seanad with the addition of Taoiseach nominees Dan Boyle and Déirdre de Búrca, and the election of Niall Ó Brolcháin in the 2009 Seanad by-election. Mark Dearey replaced de Búrca in 2010 following her resignation.)
2016	1 / 60	▲1
2020	2 / 60	▲1
2025	1 / 60	▼4 (Note: The party had five senators by the end of the 26th Seanad with the addition of Taoiseach Nominees Róisín Garvey and Vincent P. Martin, and the election of Mal O'Hara in the 2024 Seanad by-election)

== See also ==
- List of environmental organisations
