= Eamon Ryan =

Irish former politician (born 1963)

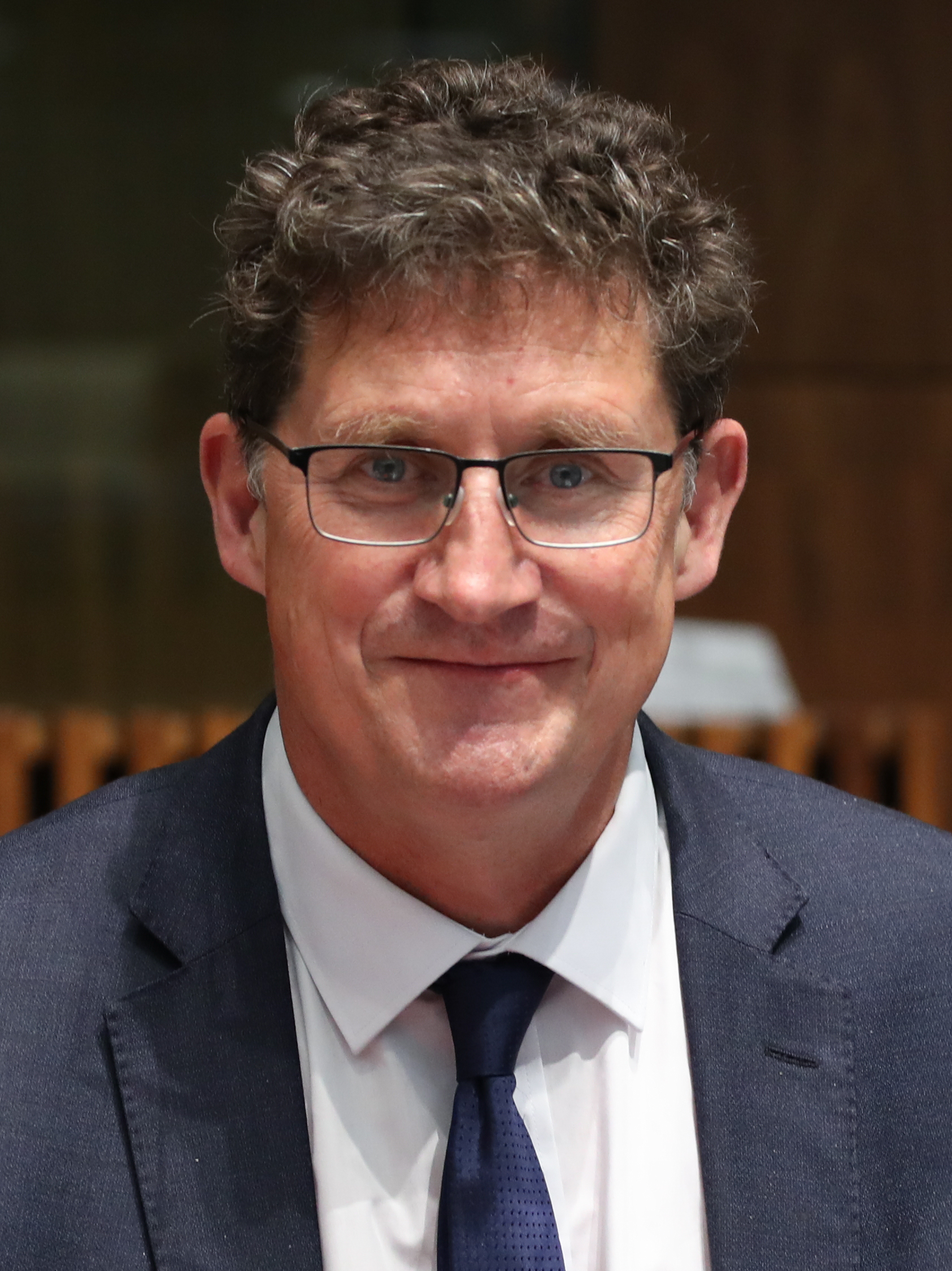
- Ryan in 2021

Minister for the Environment, Climate and Communications
- In office 27 June 2020 – 23 January 2025
- Taoiseach: Micheál Martin; Leo Varadkar; Simon Harris
- Preceded by: Richard Bruton
- Succeeded by: Darragh O'Brien

Minister for Transport
- In office 27 June 2020 – 23 January 2025
- Taoiseach: Micheál Martin; Leo Varadkar; Simon Harris
- Preceded by: Shane Ross
- Succeeded by: Darragh O'Brien

Leader of the Green Party
- In office 27 May 2011 – 18 June 2024
- Deputy: Catherine Martin
- Preceded by: John Gormley
- Succeeded by: Roderic O'Gorman

Minister for Communications, Energy and Natural Resources
- In office 14 June 2007 – 23 January 2011
- Taoiseach: Bertie Ahern; Brian Cowen
- Preceded by: Noel Dempsey
- Succeeded by: Pat Carey

Teachta Dála
- In office February 2016 – November 2024
- Constituency: Dublin Bay South
- In office May 2002 – February 2011
- Constituency: Dublin South

Personal details
- Born: Eamon Michael Ryan; 28 July 1963 (age 63) Dundrum, Dublin, Ireland
- Party: Green Party
- Spouse: Victoria White (m. 1998)
- Children: 4
- Education: University College Dublin
- Website: eamonryan.ie

Eamon Michael Ryan (born 28 July 1963) is an Irish former Green Party politician who served as Minister for the Environment, Climate and Communications and Minister for Transport from June 2020 to January 2025, and was Leader of the Green Party from May 2011 to June 2024. He served as a Teachta Dála (TD) for the Dublin Bay South constituency from 2016 to 2024, and previously from 2002 to 2011 for the Dublin South constituency. He previously served as Minister for Communications, Energy and Natural Resources from 2007 to 2011. On 18 June 2024, he announced that he was stepping down as leader of the Green Party. He retired from politics after the 2024 general election.

== Early and personal life ==
Ryan was born in Dublin in 1963 and raised in Dundrum, where he continues to live with his family. He was educated at Gonzaga College and University College Dublin, where he graduated with a Bachelor of Commerce degree. He was manager of the UCD Marketing Development Programme from 1985 to 1986, and following three years of emigration and unemployment in 1989, he founded Cycling Safaris, a company which organises cycling holidays in Ireland and Europe. He married the author and journalist Victoria White in 1998 and they have four children.

== Political career ==
He first held political office in 1998, when he was co-opted to Dublin City Council, taking up the seat previously held by John Gormley. He topped the poll at the 1999 local elections in the Rathmines local electoral area. From 1995 to 2002, he served on the advisory committee of the Dublin Transport Office. At the 2002 general election, he was first elected to Dáil Éireann as a Green Party TD for the Dublin South constituency. He served as Green Party Spokesperson for Transport, Enterprise, Trade and Employment and Communications, Marine and Natural Resources during the 29th Dáil.

In 2003, Ryan protested against the use of Shannon Airport by the U.S. military for transport of combatants and arms, in violation of Ireland's neutrality.

He announced on 13 September 2004, that he intended to seek his party's nomination to be a candidate in the 2004 presidential election. However, when it was announced that the incumbent, Mary McAleese, was seeking a second term he withdrew. His campaign was also hit by his admission of cannabis use, an illegal drug.

=== First term in government (2007–2011) ===
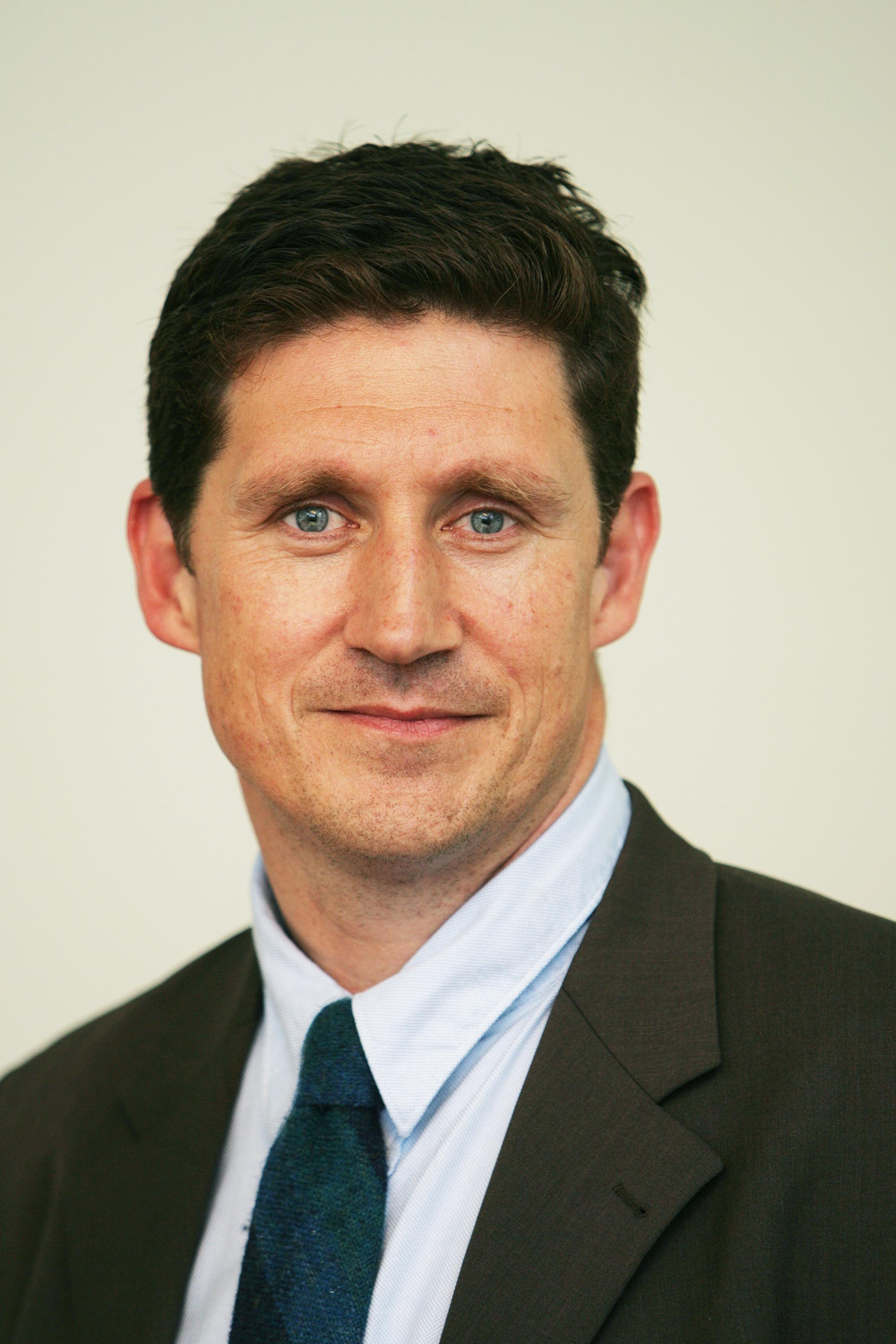
Ryan in 2007

Ryan was re-elected to the Dáil at the 2007 general election held on 24 May. On 13 June, the Green Party voted in favour of entering into a coalition government with Fianna Fáil and the Progressive Democrats at a special party convention. Ryan was appointed to the cabinet by Taoiseach Bertie Ahern, as Minister for Communications, Energy and Natural Resources when the 30th Dáil sat the following day.

As Minister, he stated his priorities would be to improve upon the changes underway in the Irish energy sector, with strong emphasis on aiding the adaptation of renewables and building retrofitting. He also aimed to enhance communications infrastructure where Ireland had fallen behind other countries. During his period in office, installed wind capacity in Ireland doubled, and by 2010 the average daily energy derived from renewable sources (as a percentage of total demand) had increased to 17%, peaking at 42%. He also committed Ireland to the European Super Grid programme in 2009 and announced major government investment in marine energy research projects. Government schemes were expanded for home energy retrofitting as uptake increased, the National Broadband Scheme was completed, a Broadband for Schools Scheme launched, and a national electric vehicle and chargepoint initiative was announced in conjunction with the ESB Electric Ireland and Peugeot Citroën, which was subsequently implemented by the new government.

In response to the Corrib gas controversy, the environmental activist organisation Shell to Sea and its spokesperson Maura Harrington, criticised Ryan for joining Fianna Fáil in coalition as the terms of the programme for government did not include a reversal or renegotiation of the proposed gas pipeline and refinery at Broadhaven Bay, County Mayo. Before entering into government, Ryan supported the aims of the Shell to Sea campaign and attended their protests. Ryan was also criticised by Shell to Sea for failing to launch an independent review of the decision, as stipulated by the Green Party in a motion passed at their annual convention in 2007.

Ryan resigned as Minister for Communications, Energy and Natural Resources on 23 January 2011, when the Green Party withdrew from government. The following day he helped broker an agreement with Fine Gael and the Labour Party which ensured the passing of the 2011 Finance bill, prior to the holding of the general election on the 25 February 2011. He lost his seat at election, receiving 6.8% of the vote.

=== Green Party leader in opposition (2011–2020) ===
He was one of three candidates to contest the subsequent Green Party leadership election of May 2011. He was elected leader on 27 May 2011, succeeding John Gormley. The party had no representation in the Oireachtas when he became leader.

In 2012, he became an associate with E3G working on an assessment of the development potential of the North Seas Offshore Grid Initiative in a project which was supported by the European Climate Foundation and the Children's Investment Fund Foundation. In 2013, he organised two climate gatherings which brought international climate experts to Ireland to examine what new narratives are needed to increase public support for action on the climate issue.

He was the Green Party candidate in the Dublin constituency at the 2014 European Parliament election, but was not elected. He was elected a TD for the Dublin Bay South constituency in the 2016 general election, alongside deputy leader Catherine Martin who secured a seat in Dublin Rathdown. The Greens' return to the Dáil following their wipeout in 2011 was the first time in Irish election history that a political party had been able to survive losing all their TDs.

In 2019, Ryan called for wolves to be reintroduced to Ireland. Fine Gael rejected this suggestion, with Minister for Culture, Heritage and the Gaeltacht Josepha Madigan responding that her department had no plans to reintroduce wolves into the country, saying that doing so would do damage to farming. He reiterated the following January that he would like to see them introduced in his lifetime. Also in 2019, comments he made on car use in rural Ireland which were published in an article by The Irish Times was criticised online. The newspaper also stated that Ryan suggested that a village of 300 people needs just 30 cars to operate. In the article, Ryan stated people could walk to a pick-up point or cycle. Responding to the article, the party took issue with the headline, and in a statement said the original headline ("You don't need to own a car to live in rural Ireland" - Green Party T.D') had caused “a flood of online fury – and rightly so, because a suggestion like that would be ridiculous and impractical”.

In February 2020, the Green Party had its best election result in the general election of that year, with the party increasing its representation in the Dáil to 12 TDs. Ryan was re-elected in the Dublin Bay South constituency, topping the poll with 22.4% of the first-preference votes.

In March 2020, in a speech in a debate on responses to the COVID-19 pandemic crisis, he made comments on growing food in the event of a supply crisis that went viral online, saying, "we'll have our salads ready to go!" In June 2020, he was criticised online, particularly by Green Party councillors, for his use of the phrase "you nigger" when quoting director Sean Gallen on his experiences of racism. Gallen himself said that Ryan's intentions were "really good" as he tried "to bring up this big issue of racism within an Irish context". Ryan publicly apologised the same day as the speech.

=== Second term in government (2020–2024) ===
On 27 June 2020, following 139 days of negotiations, the members of Fianna Fáil, Fine Gael and the Green Party all voted in favour of entering government together as a coalition. There had been concern that the proposal would not be accepted by the Green members, as the proposal required that it pass with 66% of the members in favour it. However, in the end, 76% of the Green Party membership voted in favour of the deal. The Irish Times journalist Pat Leahy described the vote to enter government as "vindication" for Ryan's leadership of the party and suggested it would strengthen his hand in the subsequent Green Party leadership contest. Green Party rules require a leadership election within 6 months of a general election in Ireland. Ryan sought re-election, and Deputy Leader Catherine Martin also contested the position, leading to the 2020 Green Party leadership election. Ryan was considered to represent the moderate "Old Guard" who were in favour of entering government while Martin was considered to represent younger, more radical Green party members apprehensive about working with Fianna Fáil or Fine Gael. On 23 July 2020, Ryan was re-elected as Green Party leader, defeating deputy leader Catherine Martin by 994 votes (51.24%) to 946 (48.76%).

On entering the government, Ryan was appointed as Minister for the Environment, Climate and Communications and Minister for Transport. He commissioned the building of nine new gas-fired power plants to prevent the risk of electricity shortages. In May 2022, Ryan ruled out nuclear power as an option for Ireland's transition away from fossil fuels, arguing that offshore wind was cheaper and better suited to the Irish system.

In June 2021, Ryan received the Green Leader Award.

In 2022, Ryan was appointed by the European Union as its chief negotiator for climate damage reparation at the 2022 United Nations Climate Change Conference (COP27) in Egypt. He went on to serve a similar role at COP28 in Dubai and COP29 in Baku.

On 17 December 2022, he was re-appointed to the same positions following Leo Varadkar's re-appointment as Taoiseach. On 9 April 2024, the same occurred following Simon Harris' appointment as Taoiseach.

On 18 June 2024, following a poor showing for the Green Party in local and European elections, he announced that he was stepping down as leader of the Green Party and would not contest the 2024 general election.

== Post-political career ==
On leaving office, Ryan took up a role as High-Level Advocate with the Climate and Clean Air Coalition and represented the coalition at COP30 in Brazil in 2025.

Also in 2025 he was appointed chairperson of the European Commission's Housing Advisory Board which is tasked with providing policy recommendations for the European Affordable Housing Plan under European Commissioner for Energy and Housing Dan Jørgensen.

In January 2026, he spoke out in support of the EU–Mercosur Partnership Agreement, disagreeing with the position adopted by his former colleagues in the Green Party, Roderic O'Gorman and Malcolm Noonan, who opposed the deal on environmental and food safety grounds, and because of the impact it would have on Irish farmers.

In April 2026, Ryan wrote in the Irish Times that Ireland's future energy needs should be met by "renewables and nuclear".

== Filmography ==
- Forever is Now (2026), a fly-on-the-wall documentary which follows Ryan through his final 18 months in government.

Political offices
Preceded by Noel Dempsey as Minister for Communications, Marine and Natural Resources	Minister for Communications, Energy and Natural Resources; 2007–2011	Succeeded by Pat Carey
Preceded by Richard Bruton as Minister for Communications, Climate Action and Environment	Minister for the Environment, Climate and Communications; 2020–2025	Succeeded by Darragh O'Brien
Preceded by Shane Ross as Minister for Transport, Tourism and Sport	Minister for Transport; 2020–2025	Succeeded by Darragh O'Brien
Party political offices
Preceded by John Gormley	Leader of the Green Party; 2011–2024	Succeeded by Roderic O'Gorman

Dáil	Election	Deputy (Party)	Deputy (Party)	Deputy (Party)	Deputy (Party)	Deputy (Party)	Deputy (Party)	Deputy (Party)
2nd	1921	Thomas Kelly (SF)	Daniel McCarthy (SF)	Constance Markievicz (SF)	Cathal Ó Murchadha (SF)	4 seats 1921–1923		
3rd	1922	Thomas Kelly (PT-SF)	Daniel McCarthy (PT-SF)	William O'Brien (Lab)	Myles Keogh (Ind.)	4 seats 1921–1923		
4th	1923	Philip Cosgrave (CnaG)	Daniel McCarthy (CnaG)	Constance Markievicz (Rep)	Myles Keogh (Ind.)	Cathal Ó Murchadha (Rep)	Michael Hayes (CnaG)	Peadar Doyle (CnaG)
4th	1923 by-election	Philip Cosgrave (CnaG)	Daniel McCarthy (CnaG)	Constance Markievicz (Rep)	Myles Keogh (Ind.)	Cathal Ó Murchadha (Rep)	Hugh Kennedy (CnaG)	Peadar Doyle (CnaG)
4th	March 1924 by-election	James O'Mara (CnaG)	Daniel McCarthy (CnaG)	Constance Markievicz (Rep)	Myles Keogh (Ind.)	Cathal Ó Murchadha (Rep)	Hugh Kennedy (CnaG)	Peadar Doyle (CnaG)
4th	November 1924 by-election	James O'Mara (CnaG)	Daniel McCarthy (CnaG)	Constance Markievicz (Rep)	Myles Keogh (Ind.)	Cathal Ó Murchadha (Rep)	Seán Lemass (SF)	Peadar Doyle (CnaG)
4th	1925 by-election	James O'Mara (CnaG)	Thomas Hennessy (CnaG)	Constance Markievicz (Rep)	Myles Keogh (Ind.)	Cathal Ó Murchadha (Rep)	Seán Lemass (SF)	Peadar Doyle (CnaG)
5th	1927 (Jun)	James Beckett (CnaG)	Vincent Rice (NL)	Constance Markievicz (FF)	Myles Keogh (Ind.)	Thomas Lawlor (Lab)	Seán Lemass (FF)	Peadar Doyle (CnaG)
5th	1927 by-election	James Beckett (CnaG)	Vincent Rice (NL)	Thomas Hennessy (CnaG)	Myles Keogh (Ind.)	Thomas Lawlor (Lab)	Seán Lemass (FF)	Peadar Doyle (CnaG)
6th	1927 (Sep)	James Beckett (CnaG)	Robert Briscoe (FF)	Thomas Hennessy (CnaG)	Myles Keogh (CnaG)	Frank Kerlin (FF)	Seán Lemass (FF)	Peadar Doyle (CnaG)
7th	1932	James Beckett (CnaG)	Robert Briscoe (FF)	Thomas Hennessy (CnaG)	Myles Keogh (CnaG)	James Lynch (FF)	Seán Lemass (FF)	Peadar Doyle (CnaG)
8th	1933	James Beckett (CnaG)	Robert Briscoe (FF)	James McGuire (CnaG)	Thomas Kelly (FF)	James Lynch (FF)	Seán Lemass (FF)	Peadar Doyle (CnaG)
9th	1937	Myles Keogh (FG)	Robert Briscoe (FF)	Thomas Lawlor (Lab)	Thomas Kelly (FF)	Joseph Hannigan (Ind.)	Seán Lemass (FF)	Peadar Doyle (FG)
10th	1938	James Beckett (FG)	Robert Briscoe (FF)	James Lynch (FF)	Thomas Kelly (FF)	Joseph Hannigan (Ind.)	Seán Lemass (FF)	Peadar Doyle (FG)
10th	1939 by-election	John McCann (FF)	Robert Briscoe (FF)	James Lynch (FF)	Thomas Kelly (FF)	Joseph Hannigan (Ind.)	Seán Lemass (FF)	Peadar Doyle (FG)
11th	1943	Maurice Dockrell (FG)	Robert Briscoe (FF)	James Lynch (FF)	James Larkin Jnr (Lab)	John McCann (FF)	Seán Lemass (FF)	Peadar Doyle (FG)
12th	1944	Maurice Dockrell (FG)	Robert Briscoe (FF)	James Lynch (FF)	James Larkin Jnr (Lab)	John McCann (FF)	Seán Lemass (FF)	Peadar Doyle (FG)
13th	1948	Constituency abolished. See Dublin South-Central, Dublin South-East and Dublin South-West.						

Dáil	Election	Deputy (Party)	Deputy (Party)	Deputy (Party)	Deputy (Party)	Deputy (Party)
22nd	1981	Niall Andrews (FF)	Séamus Brennan (FF)	Nuala Fennell (FG)	John Kelly (FG)	Alan Shatter (FG)
23rd	1982 (Feb)	Niall Andrews (FF)	Séamus Brennan (FF)	Nuala Fennell (FG)	John Kelly (FG)	Alan Shatter (FG)
24th	1982 (Nov)	Niall Andrews (FF)	Séamus Brennan (FF)	Nuala Fennell (FG)	John Kelly (FG)	Alan Shatter (FG)
25th	1987	Tom Kitt (FF)	Séamus Brennan (FF)	Anne Colley (PDs)	John Kelly (FG)	Alan Shatter (FG)
26th	1989	Tom Kitt (FF)	Séamus Brennan (FF)	Nuala Fennell (FG)	Roger Garland (GP)	Alan Shatter (FG)
27th	1992	Tom Kitt (FF)	Séamus Brennan (FF)	Liz O'Donnell (PDs)	Eithne FitzGerald (Lab)	Alan Shatter (FG)
28th	1997	Tom Kitt (FF)	Séamus Brennan (FF)	Liz O'Donnell (PDs)	Olivia Mitchell (FG)	Alan Shatter (FG)
29th	2002	Tom Kitt (FF)	Séamus Brennan (FF)	Liz O'Donnell (PDs)	Olivia Mitchell (FG)	Eamon Ryan (GP)
30th	2007	Tom Kitt (FF)	Séamus Brennan (FF)	Alan Shatter (FG)	Olivia Mitchell (FG)	Eamon Ryan (GP)
30th	2009 by-election	Tom Kitt (FF)	George Lee (FG)	Alan Shatter (FG)	Olivia Mitchell (FG)	Eamon Ryan (GP)
31st	2011	Shane Ross (Ind.)	Peter Mathews (FG)	Alan Shatter (FG)	Olivia Mitchell (FG)	Alex White (Lab)
32nd	2016	Constituency abolished. See Dublin Rathdown, Dublin South-West and Dún Laoghaire.				

Dáil	Election	Deputy (Party)	Deputy (Party)	Deputy (Party)	Deputy (Party)
32nd	2016	Eamon Ryan (GP)	Jim O'Callaghan (FF)	Kate O'Connell (FG)	Eoghan Murphy (FG)
33rd	2020	Eamon Ryan (GP)	Jim O'Callaghan (FF)	Chris Andrews (SF)	Eoghan Murphy (FG)
33rd	2021 by-election	Eamon Ryan (GP)	Jim O'Callaghan (FF)	Chris Andrews (SF)	Ivana Bacik (Lab)
34th	2024	James Geoghegan (FG)	Jim O'Callaghan (FF)	Eoin Hayes (SD)	Ivana Bacik (Lab)
