= Catherine Martin (politician) =

Irish politician (born 1972)

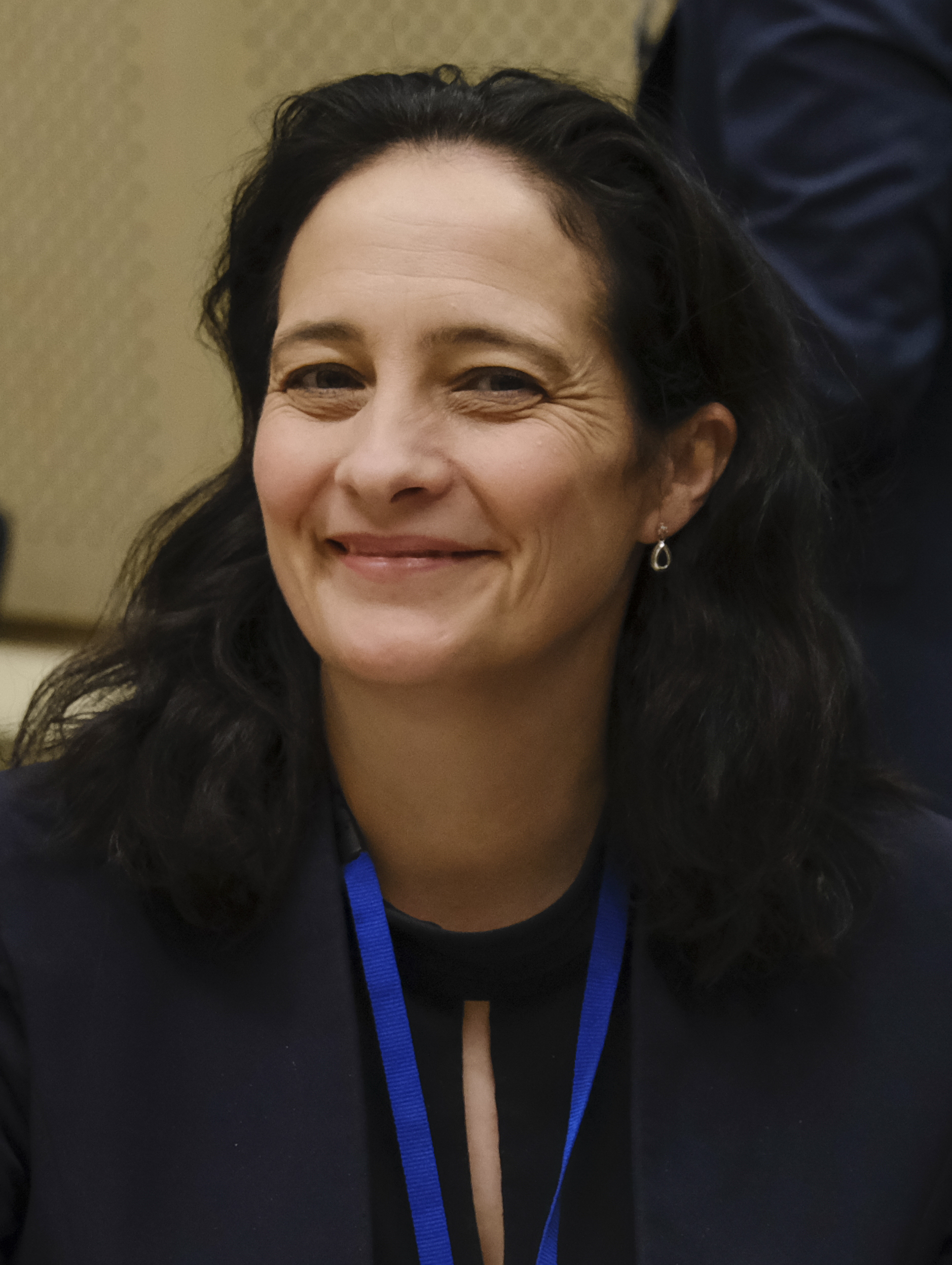
- Martin in 2022

Minister for Tourism, Culture, Arts, Gaeltacht, Sport and Media
- In office 27 June 2020 – 23 January 2025
- Taoiseach: Micheál Martin; Leo Varadkar; Simon Harris
- Preceded by: Josepha Madigan
- Succeeded by: Patrick O'Donovan

Deputy leader of the Green Party
- In office 11 June 2011 – 14 July 2024
- Leader: Eamon Ryan
- Preceded by: Mary White
- Succeeded by: Róisín Garvey

Teachta Dála
- In office February 2016 – November 2024
- Constituency: Dublin Rathdown

Personal details
- Born: 30 September 1972 (age 54) Carrickmacross, Monaghan, Ireland
- Party: Green Party
- Spouse: Francis Noel Duffy (m. 2002)
- Children: 3
- Relatives: Vincent P. Martin (brother)
- Education: Maynooth University
- Website: catherinemartin.ie

Catherine Martin (born 30 September 1972) is an Irish Green Party politician who served as Minister for Tourism, Culture, Arts, Gaeltacht, Sport and Media from June 2020 to January 2025 and was deputy leader of the Green Party from June 2011 to July 2024. She served as a Teachta Dála (TD) for the Dublin Rathdown constituency from 2016 to 2024. She lost her seat at the 2024 general election.

== Personal life ==
Martin was born in 1972 and is a native of Carrickmacross, Monaghan. She studied at Maynooth University. She was a teacher of English and Music, and the head of the Green Schools Committee at St. Tiernan's Community School in Dundrum for 15 years prior to being elected to the Dáil. She is married to Francis Noel Duffy, also a former Green Party TD and they have three children. Catherine and Francis first met in 1999 during a local election in their native Carrickmacross in County Monaghan, where Catherine's brother Vincent P. Martin and Francis' father were both campaigning for office. Vincent is also a member of the Green Party. In June 2020, Vincent became a senator on the Green Party entering government.

== Political career ==
=== Green Party ===
She joined the Green Party in 2007. In 2009, her brother, Vincent, began a hiatus from politics and as a result Catherine was co-opted to Vincent's seat on the Monaghan County Council. Catherine in turn vacated the seat on the death of the Martins' mother and co-opted it to local green party member Darcy Lonergan. She was elected as deputy leader of the Green Party in 2011 simultaneous to Eamon Ryan becoming leader. In 2014, she was elected to Dún Laoghaire–Rathdown County Council, and was elected to the Dáil following the 2016 general election, after receiving 4,122 first preference votes.

She was the Green Party's Education spokesperson. Martin was elected the first chair of The Irish Women's Parliamentary Caucus in November 2017, an organisation she spearheaded the creation of.

In May 2020, following nominations from several councillors, she said that she would give 'serious consideration' into running for leadership of the Green Party in the 2020 Green Party leadership election. On 6 June, it was confirmed she would contest the leadership. Martin received 200 nominations for the contest, four times as many as was needed. Within the Green Party, Martin's candidacy is seen to represent the views of younger, more radical Green Party members who did not wish for the party to enter into coalition with Fine Gael or Fianna Fáil, in contrast to the leadership of Eamon Ryan which is seen to represent the moderate "old guard" who are open to working with those parties.

Despite this, Martin was the lead negotiator for the Green Party in the government formation talks with Fine Gael and Fianna Fáil, and after a deal was reached, Martin endorsed the deal and argued in favour of it. It was noted at the time Martin's husband Francis Noel Duffy abstained from the vote on the deal, and later spoke out against the deal. Martin suggested that this was "part of a healthy debate" within the Green Party over the merits of the deal.

In July 2020, Ryan retained the leadership of the Green Party by narrowly defeating Martin by 994 votes (51.24%) to 946 (48.76%), a winning margin of 48 votes (2.47%), in a postal ballot of party members (turnout was 66.7% of the 2,923 ballots sent out, and there were 10 spoiled votes (0.5%) among the 1,950 ballots returned).

=== Minister for Tourism, Culture, Arts, Gaeltacht, Sport and Media ===
On entering government, Martin was appointed as Minister for Tourism, Culture, Arts, Gaeltacht, Sport and Media, succeeding both Josepha Madigan and Shane Ross in different aspects of her portfolio.

On 17 December 2022, she was re-appointed to the same positions following Leo Varadkar's appointment as Taoiseach.

On 22 June 2023, RTÉ admitted that it paid its top presenter Ryan Tubridy €345,000 more than publicly declared between 2017 and 2022. Martin said it was unacceptable that the expected standards of transparency and accountability had not been met. Two days later, Martin met with chair of the RTÉ Board Siún Ní Raghallaigh and ordered a full review of the governance and culture at RTÉ and said its executive board was not told of the hidden payments that caused an "existential" crisis for the national broadcaster.

Martin lost her seat in the 2024 Irish general election.

== Post-political career ==
In January 2026, Martin was appointed Head of Policy for the newly established Irish branch of The Ivors Academy.

== See also ==
- Families in the Oireachtas

Political offices
Preceded by Shane Ross as Minister for Transport, Tourism and Sport	Minister for Tourism, Culture, Arts, Gaeltacht, Sport and Media; 2020–2025	Succeeded by Patrick O'Donovan
Preceded by Josepha Madigan as Minister for Culture, Heritage and the Gaeltacht	Minister for Tourism, Culture, Arts, Gaeltacht, Sport and Media; 2020–2025	Succeeded by Patrick O'Donovan

Dáil	Election	Deputy (Party)	Deputy (Party)	Deputy (Party)	Deputy (Party)
32nd	2016	Catherine Martin (GP)	Shane Ross (Ind.)	Josepha Madigan (FG)	3 seats 2016–2024
33rd	2020	Catherine Martin (GP)	Neale Richmond (FG)	Josepha Madigan (FG)	3 seats 2016–2024
34th	2024	Sinéad Gibney (SD)	Neale Richmond (FG)	Maeve O'Connell (FG)	Shay Brennan (FF)
