= 1924 Dublin South by-election =

Two by-elections were held in Dublin South in 1924:

- March 1924 Dublin South by-election
- November 1924 Dublin South by-election
