= Men of Good Will =

Roman-fleuve by Jules Romains

Les Hommes de bonne volonté
- Cover of the 1941 Flammarion edition of the first volume, The Sixth of October
- Author: Jules Romains
- Translator: Warre B. Wells (vol. 1–3); Gerard Hopkins (vol.4–14) volume 28/latter half of 14 remains untranslated
- Language: French
- Genre: Roman-fleuve
- Publisher: Flammarion (France); Alfred A. Knopf (United States)
- Publication date: 1932–1946 and 1956
- Publication place: France
- English publication date: 1933–1946
- Pages: 7,386

Les Hommes de bonne volonté (transl. Men of Good Will) is an epic roman-fleuve by French writer Jules Romains, published in 28 volumes between 1932 and 1956. It has been classified both as a novel cycle and a novel and at two million words and 7,386 pages, has been cited as one of the longest novels ever written.

== Plot ==
The volumes, written in chronological order from volume one, Le 6 octobre, through volume twenty-seven, Le 7 octobre, between them cover 6 October 1908 through 7 October 1933 in French life—an average of one volume per year, book-ended by one volume each for two particular days. The plot is expansive and features a large cast of characters, rather than narrowly focusing on individuals, but the two principals are Pierre Jallez, a poet loosely based on Romains, and Jean Jerphanion, a teacher who later goes into politics. They meet in volume 2 starting at the École Normale Supérieure and become friends. Jerphanion marries a woman named Odette and lives happily with her, while Jallez tries several times to find love and is eventually married to Françoise Mailleul. In the course of their careers, meanwhile, Jerphanion spends ten years in the Chamber of Deputies and is briefly Minister of Foreign Affairs, and Jallez finds success as a novelist, each trying to secure peace in their own way, though the First World War takes place halfway through the story, which ends with the first foreshadowings of World War II.

== Structure and themes ==
Structurally, Men of Good Will is a roman-fleuve—a long work across several volumes with continuation of plot and related characters that may mean it forms a single novel. (Note: A roman-fleuve is literally a river-novel. In his 1968 introduction to Émile Zola's L'Œuvre (The Masterpiece), Thomas Walton, riffing on Men of Good Will's length, describes it as a "roman-delta".) It has been described as a novel cycle or novel sequence, and as a novel, by different writers. Its full extent, at over 2,100,000 words, across 7,386 pages, 827 chapters and 28 volumes, means it has been described as one of the longest novels ever written—sometimes the single longest.

Men of Good Will and particularly certain portions of it—Encyclopædia Britannica picks out the victory parade at the end of World War I—are emblematic of Romain's philosophy of unanimism, characterised by an interest in the collective rather than individuals. In the preface, Romains says that the ideas behind it can be traced to his very first work, La vie unanime, published in 1904. This emphasis on group spirit is, writes Harry Bergholz, partly why Men of Good Will jumps from character to character as much as it does, rather than following one thread. While characters do recur, their stories may be told discontinuously. Bergholz gives the example of Françoise Mailleul, whose birth is the subject of a chapter in volume 9 but who doesn't feature again, apart from brief reappearances in volumes 13 and 18, until her marriage to Jallez in volume 26. Rather than telling the story of a few people, Romains' aim is "to paint a complete picture of our twentieth century civilization, in all its aspects, human and inhuman, social as well as psychological". Plot threads, too, are begun, recursively interrupted, and returned to later, sometimes several volumes on. This cross-volume inter-cutting presses the reader to take the work as a whole, since plots are not always resolved within single volumes, which therefore cannot be fully understood without reference to the others.

In all, there are approximately 40 main characters but counts of the full cast vary widely, from 600 total through 1,000 to 1,600. The characters are listed at the beginning of volume 25 (Le Tapis magique). They cover all walks of life, both in terms of class and occupation, as part of attempting to depict society as a whole, though the poor are underrepresented and the bulk of the novel relates to the middle classes. Other themes of the book include marriage and friendship, the internal deviance of outwardly respectable families, Oedipal issues in father-son relationships (literal and metaphorical), Freemasonry, crime, sexual perversion, and the potential—or lack of it—for goodwill, suitably applied, to avoid collective failures such as wars. War and the struggle for peace are continuing themes throughout. The first and last volumes each feature a group of schoolchildren being lectured on the dangers of war. Jallez and Jerphanion are preoccupied with these considerations, and two volumes are dedicated to the Battle of Verdun, a key point in the narrative.

== Publication ==
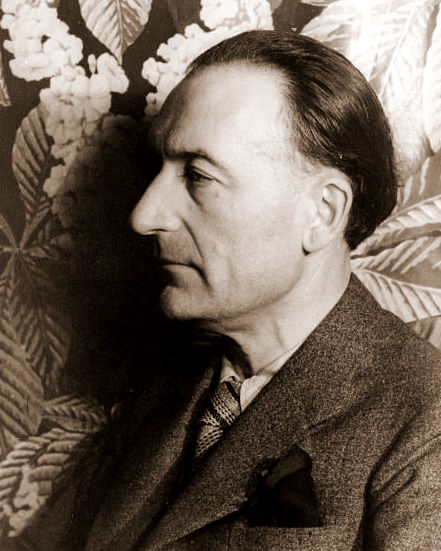
Jules Romains, 1936

Romains began writing Men of Good Will in 1931 and announced the project in 1932. The original French publishers were Flammarion and each of the 28 volumes sold, in its first printing, at least 40,000 copies. By 1946, around 85,000 copies had been sold of the first volume. Romains wrote two volumes each year at around 600 pages between them. There were 14 volumes in the first American editions, in which publishers Alfred A. Knopf combined each of the 2 annual volumes into one but left the 28th volume (French edition published in 1956) untranslated in English. The Knopf editions were translated into English by Warre B. Wells (volumes 1–3) and Gerard Hopkins (volumes 4–14).

== Reception ==
The project was widely acclaimed in France as it began but critical opinion turned against it part way through. In America, where Romains moved at the beginning of World War II, Romains and his work were spurned when it became clear how late he had continued to be in contact with Nazi figures including Joseph Goebbels.

Men of Good Will has been compared to Jean-Christophe, Romain Rolland's ten-volume French novel published between 1904 and 1912. Reviews have particularly noted the strong and rapid characterisation that Romains achieved, giving distinct personalities to each of the huge number of characters involved. Britannica describes the two volumes on Verdun, (volume 15 Prélude à Verdun and volume 16, Verdun, both published in 1938) as "remarkable visions of the soul of a world at war". Denis Saurat wrote in Modern French Literature, 1870-1940 (1946) that they are "truly an epic presentation of war". The work as a whole has been variously judged to be a "sprawling masterpiece" and "what began as a magnificent fresco of an entire generation" but degenerated "into a daguerreotype of one embittered, splenetic man".

== Volumes ==
The French titles and their English counterparts in the Knopf editions are:

French Title	English Title	Dual Volume
1. Le 6 octobre	1. The Sixth of October	1. Men of Good Will
2. Crime de Quinette	2. Quinette's Crime	1. Men of Good Will
3. Les Amours enfantines	3. Childhood's Loves	2. Passion's Pilgrims
4. Éros de Paris	4. Eros in Paris	2. Passion's Pilgrims
5. Les Superbes	5. The Proud	3. The Proud and The Meek
6. Les Humbles	6. The Meek	3. The Proud and The Meek
7. Recherche d'une église	7. The Lonely	4. The World From Below
8. Province	8. Provincial Interlude	4. The World From Below
9. Montée des périls	9. Floor Warning	5. The Earth Trembles
10. Les Pouvoirs	10. The Powers That Be	5. The Earth Trembles
11. Recours à l'abîme	11. To The Gutter	6. The Depths and the Heights
12. Les Créateurs	12. To The Stars	6. The Depths and the Heights
13. Mission à Rome	13. Mission to Rome	7. Death of a World
14. Le Drapeau noir	14. The Black Flag	7. Death of a World
15. Prélude à Verdun	15. The Prelude	8. Verdun
16. Verdun	16. The Battle	8. Verdun
17. Vorge contre Quinette	17. Vorge Against Quinette	9. Aftermath
18. La Douceur de la vie	18. The Sweets of Life	9. Aftermath
19. Cette grande lueur à l'Est	19. Promise of Dawn	10. The New Day
20. Le Monde est ton aventure	20. The World is Your Adventure	10. The New Day
21. Journées dans la montagne	21. Mountain Days	11. Work and Play
22. Les Travaux et les Joies	22. Work and Play	11. Work and Play
23. Naissance de la bande	23. The Gathering of the Gangs	12. The Wind is Rising
24. Comparutions	24. Offered in Evidence	12. The Wind is Rising
25. Le Tapis magique	25. The Magic Carpet	13. Escape in Passion
26. Françoise	26. Françoise	13. Escape in Passion
27. Le 7 octobre	27. The Seventh of October	14. The Seventh of October
28. Les Fils de Jerphanion	28. The Son of Jerphanion	Still untranslated

== See also ==
- Les Misérables
- Artamène ou le Grand Cyrus
- La Comédie humaine
- À la recherche du temps perdu
