= Eoin Ó Broin (disambiguation) =

Eoin Ó Broin (born 1972) is an Irish Sinn Féin politician and Dáil deputy for Dublin Mid-West

Eoin Ó Broin or Eoin O'Broin may also refer to:

- Eoin O'Broin, stage name Noisestorm, Irish DJ and music producer
- Eoin Ó Broin, Irish Social Democrat (formerly independent) politician and member of South Dublin County Council

== See also ==
- John O'Byrne (1884–1954) Irish barrister and judge, and chair of the Irish Legal Terms Advisory Committee
