= Irish Statesman =

Irish political magazine

- Issue of 15 September 1923, with pieces by George Bernard Shaw and James G. Douglas
- Former editors: Warre B. Wells
- Categories: Politics, news
- Frequency: Weekly
- First issue: 1919
- Final issue: 1930
- Country: Ireland
- Based in: Dublin
- Language: English

The Irish Statesman was a weekly journal promoting the views of the Irish Dominion League. It ran from 27 June 1919 to June 1930, edited by Warre B. Wells, assisted by James Winder Good, and with contributions from W. B. Yeats, George Bernard Shaw, and George Russell ('AE'). The League's manifesto was first published in the journal's first issue.

The title was revived in 1922, after the League was defunct, and it was merged with the Irish Homestead. George Russell was appointed editor, and he was supplied with good staff and contributors. A major contributor was Russell's friend and confidante, Susan L. Mitchell, who died in 1926.

In 1927 Maighréad Ní Annagáin and her husband, Seamus Clandillon, authors of a song collection called Londubh an Chairn, sued the Irish Statesman Publishing Company Ltd. and a reviewer, for libel. They claimed that the defendants published an article on 19 November 1927, in the course of which it was stated that in the collection, which consisted of seventy-five airs, there was no note stating the source of airs or words. They also claimed that there were allegations of slovenliness and ignorance on the part of the authors and that they had taken up a disproportionate amount of space broadcasting their own merits and platform successes in the following issues of the magazine. They sought £2,000. The Irish Statesman lost the case. This ultimately led to its ceasing publishing due to financial difficulties in 1930.

On the demise of the Irish Statesman, the Irish Times wrote: "Russell, and the Statesman, was often accused by the more bigoted and ultramontane sections of the population of being pagan and anti-Irish, but what they really meant was that he stood for intellectual liberty at a time when almost everyone else was clamouring for some restrictions everywhere."

== References and sources ==
=== Sources ===
- Wells, Warre B. (1922). Irish Indiscretions. London: Allen & Unwin.
- Barbara Hayley and Enda McKay (ed.), Three Hundred Years of Irish Periodicals, Dublin : Lilliput Press, 1987
