= Seamus Hughes (trade unionist) =

Irish trade unionist (1881–1943)

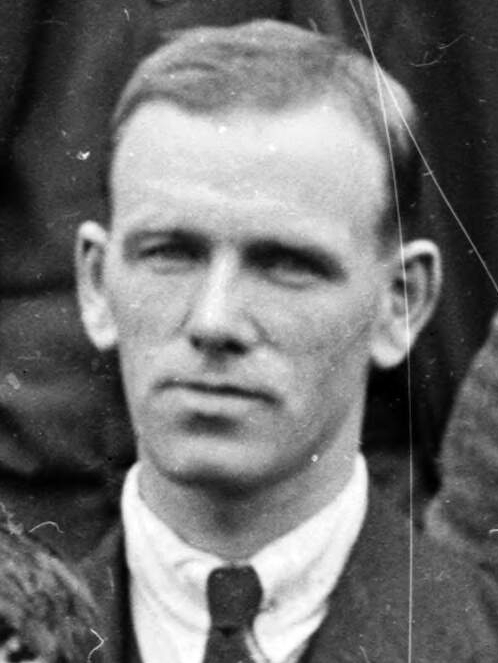
- Hughes in August 1918

Personal details
- Born: James Joseph Hughes; 18 May 1881 Dublin, Ireland
- Died: 23 January 1943 (aged 61)
- Party: Socialist Party of Ireland; Labour Party; Cumann na nGaedheal
- Occupation: Journalist; Broadcaster; Trade Unionist

Military service
- Branch/service: Irish Citizen Army
- Battles/wars: Easter Rising

James Joseph (Seamus) Hughes (Irish: Séamus Seosamh Ó hAodha; 18 May 1881 – 23 January 1943) was an Irish trade unionist, revolutionary, composer, and public servant.

== Biography ==
He was born near Mountjoy Square, Dublin, to James Hughes, a baker from County Offaly. His mother died of tuberculosis when he was six. He attended O'Connell School and spent time at a Dominican seminary in Voiron, France. He taught French in Newbridge College and was a clerk at a firm exporting eggs. He married Josephine Hackett from Milltown, Dublin in 1912; they had five children.

In the 1910s, Hughes became interested in the Gaelic Revival, and became involved in Gaelic football and traditional Irish music. In c. 1911, Hughes was brought into the Irish Republican Brotherhood secret society. In 1914, as a member of the Irish Volunteers, he was involved in the Howth gun-running which saw hundreds of rifles secretly brought to Ireland from Germany to be used by Irish nationalists.

In 1913 Hughes, who by this time had become affiliated with the socialist James Connolly, was involved in journalism and wrote articles supporting the strikers during the Dublin Lockout.

In 1916, Hughes fought with the Irish Citizen Army in Jacob's biscuit factory during the Easter Rising and was subsequently imprisoned by the British until May 1917. He was acting secretary of the ITGWU while Jim Larkin was in America but was ousted by William O'Brien. He was arrested at Liberty Hall after Bloody Sunday 1920.

Following the Anglo-Irish treaty and the ensuing Irish Civil War, Hughes supported the Pro-Treaty faction. This affiliation subsequently saw Hughes move away from his previous ties to the Labour movement in Ireland and join the ranks of Cumann na nGaedheal. Hughes was quickly made the party's first-ever secretary.

Hughes joined the civil service under the 1922 Provisional Government. In his only electoral contest, Hughes narrowly lost the November 1924 Dublin South by-election to Seán Lemass. From 1925 he worked for 2RN, later Radio Éireann, becoming its director of programming in 1929. Frank Gallagher took most of his functions in 1935, leaving Hughes only Irish-language programming. During the Emergency he was transferred to censorship of post.

During the 1920s, in parallel to his move from Labour to Cumann na nGaedheal, Hughes became associated with Catholicism conservatism: In 1924 he began writing for the Catholic Herald, while in 1926 he joined the highly conservative An Ríoghacht organisation. In 1930 he joined the Catholic fraternal organisation the Knights of Columbanus while in 1936/1937, he was a member of the Irish Christian Front, an anti-communist organisation which supported the Nationalists in the Spanish Civil War.
