= Hugh Kennedy (judge) =

Irish politician, barrister and judge (1879–1936)

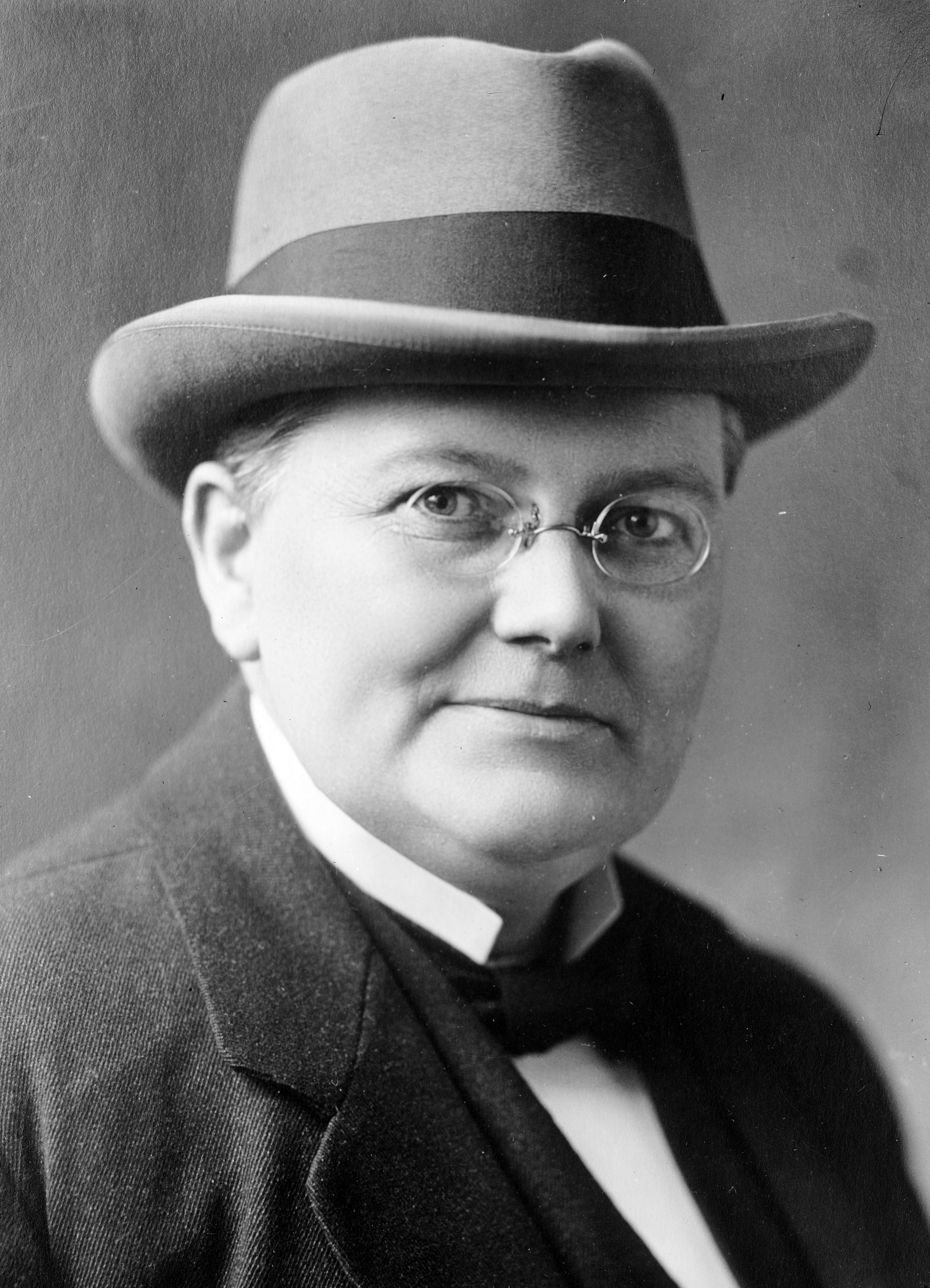

Chief Justice of Ireland
- In office 24 June 1924 – 1 December 1936
- Nominated by: Government of Ireland
- Appointed by: Tim Healy
- Preceded by: New office
- Succeeded by: Timothy Sullivan

Judge of the Supreme Court
- In office 24 June 1924 – 1 December 1936
- Nominated by: Government of Ireland
- Appointed by: Tim Healy

Attorney General of Ireland
- In office 31 January 1922 – 5 June 1924
- Taoiseach: W. T. Cosgrave
- Preceded by: New office
- Succeeded by: John O'Byrne

Teachta Dála
- In office October 1923 – November 1924
- Constituency: Dublin South

Personal details
- Born: 11 July 1879 Abbotstown, Dublin, Ireland
- Died: 1 December 1936 (aged 57) Goatstown, Dublin, Ireland
- Party: Cumann na nGaedheal
- Spouse: Clare Murphy (m. 1911)
- Relatives: Mary Olivia Kennedy (sister)
- Education: University College Dublin; King's Inns

Hugh Edward Kennedy (11 July 1879 – 1 December 1936) was an Irish judge, politician and barrister who served as Chief Justice of Ireland from 1924 to 1936, a judge of the Supreme Court from 1924 to 1936 and Attorney General of Ireland from 1922 to 1924. He served as a Teachta Dála (TD) for Dublin South from 1923 to 1924. As a member of the Irish Free State Constitution Commission, he was also one of the architects of the Constitution of the Irish Free State.

== Early life and education ==
Kennedy was born in Dublin in 1879. He was the son of the surgeon Hugh Boyle Kennedy and Mary Kate Kennedy (née Kennedy; not related), from County Tipperary. His younger sister was the journalist Mary Olivia Kennedy. He studied for the examinations of the Royal University while a student at University College Dublin and King's Inns, Dublin. He was called to the Bar in 1902. He was appointed King's Counsel in 1920 and became a Bencher of the King's Inns in 1922.

He married Clare Murphy (died 1975) in Dublin in 1911. They had no children. She was the daughter of a successful Liverpool Irish timber merchant, John Murphy.

== Legal career ==
During 1920 and 1921, Kennedy was a senior legal adviser to the plenipotentiaries of Dáil Éireann during the negotiations for the Anglo-Irish Treaty. He was highly regarded as a lawyer by Michael Collins, who later regretted that Kennedy had not been part of the delegation sent to London in 1921, to negotiate the terms of the treaty.

The Constitution Committee meeting at the Shelbourne Hotel, Dublin, with Hugh Kennedy seated third from the right

On 31 January 1922, Kennedy became the first Attorney General in the Provisional Government of the Irish Free State. Later that year, the Provisional Government appointed him to the Irish Free State Constitution Commission to draft the Constitution of the Irish Free State. The Irish Free State was established on 6 December 1922. The functions of the Provisional Government were transferred to the Executive Council of the Irish Free State. Kennedy was appointed Attorney General of the Irish Free State on 7 December 1922. However, Kennedy was not optimistic about the prospects of Irish self-governance, privately stating:

I believe we are an inferior race, temperamentally unfit and no effort can save us. We are a mean people, theatrical and narrow, posers and humbugs, ungrateful and malicious, a race of "saints and scholars" without real religion or real education. There are fine fellows and fine women too but they can do nothing but sweat in vain before they are stoned and then shot. They’ll get monuments thirty years after.

In 1923, he was appointed to the Judiciary Commission by the Government of the Irish Free State, on reference from the Government to establish a new system for the administration of justice under the Constitution of the Irish Free State. The Judiciary Commission was chaired by Lord Glenavy, who had also been the last Lord Chancellor of Ireland. It drafted the Courts of Justice Act 1924 for a new court system, including a High Court and a Supreme Court. It provided for the abolition, among other things, of the Irish Court of Appeal and the Irish High Court of Justice. Most of the judges were not reappointed to the new courts. Kennedy personally oversaw the selection of the new judges and made impressive efforts to select them on merit alone. The results were not always happy: his diary, of which some extracts have been published, reveal the increasingly unhappy atmosphere in the Supreme Court itself, due to frequent clashes between Kennedy and his colleague Gerald Fitzgibbon, since the two men proved to be so different in temperament and political outlook that they found it almost impossible to work together harmoniously. In a similar vein, Kennedy's legal opinion and choice of words could raise eyebrows amongst legal colleagues and fury in the Executive Council, for example regarding the Kenmare incident.

He was also a delegate of the Irish Free State to the Fourth Assembly of the League of Nations, between 3 and 29 September 1923.

== Political career ==
He was elected to the 4th Dáil at the 1923 Dublin South by-election held on 27 October, as a Cumann na nGaedheal TD. He was the first person to be elected in a by-election to Dáil Éireann. He resigned his seat in June 1924 when he was appointed Chief Justice of Ireland.

== Judicial career ==
On 5 June 1924, he was appointed Chief Justice of Ireland, thereby becoming the first Chief Justice of the Irish Free State. He was also the youngest person appointed Chief Justice of Ireland. When he was appointed he was 44 years old. Although the High Court of Justice and the Court of Appeal had been abolished and replaced by the High Court and the Supreme Court respectively. Kennedy campaigned for the replacement of the wigs and gowns traditionally worn by judges and barristers, which he regarded as the trappings of an alien regime. He received little support from the judges or the government and the traditional dress was retained. He held the position of Chief Justice, until his death on 1 December 1936.

In September 2015, a biography by Patrick Kennedy (no relation) was written on him called Hugh Kennedy: The Great But Neglected Chief Justice.

Legal offices
New office	Attorney General of Ireland; 1922–1924	Succeeded by John O'Byrne
New office	Chief Justice of Ireland; 1924–1936	Succeeded by Timothy Sullivan

Dáil	Election	Deputy (Party)	Deputy (Party)	Deputy (Party)	Deputy (Party)	Deputy (Party)	Deputy (Party)	Deputy (Party)
2nd	1921	Thomas Kelly (SF)	Daniel McCarthy (SF)	Constance Markievicz (SF)	Cathal Ó Murchadha (SF)	4 seats 1921–1923		
3rd	1922	Thomas Kelly (PT-SF)	Daniel McCarthy (PT-SF)	William O'Brien (Lab)	Myles Keogh (Ind.)	4 seats 1921–1923		
4th	1923	Philip Cosgrave (CnaG)	Daniel McCarthy (CnaG)	Constance Markievicz (Rep)	Myles Keogh (Ind.)	Cathal Ó Murchadha (Rep)	Michael Hayes (CnaG)	Peadar Doyle (CnaG)
4th	1923 by-election	Philip Cosgrave (CnaG)	Daniel McCarthy (CnaG)	Constance Markievicz (Rep)	Myles Keogh (Ind.)	Cathal Ó Murchadha (Rep)	Hugh Kennedy (CnaG)	Peadar Doyle (CnaG)
4th	March 1924 by-election	James O'Mara (CnaG)	Daniel McCarthy (CnaG)	Constance Markievicz (Rep)	Myles Keogh (Ind.)	Cathal Ó Murchadha (Rep)	Hugh Kennedy (CnaG)	Peadar Doyle (CnaG)
4th	November 1924 by-election	James O'Mara (CnaG)	Daniel McCarthy (CnaG)	Constance Markievicz (Rep)	Myles Keogh (Ind.)	Cathal Ó Murchadha (Rep)	Seán Lemass (SF)	Peadar Doyle (CnaG)
4th	1925 by-election	James O'Mara (CnaG)	Thomas Hennessy (CnaG)	Constance Markievicz (Rep)	Myles Keogh (Ind.)	Cathal Ó Murchadha (Rep)	Seán Lemass (SF)	Peadar Doyle (CnaG)
5th	1927 (Jun)	James Beckett (CnaG)	Vincent Rice (NL)	Constance Markievicz (FF)	Myles Keogh (Ind.)	Thomas Lawlor (Lab)	Seán Lemass (FF)	Peadar Doyle (CnaG)
5th	1927 by-election	James Beckett (CnaG)	Vincent Rice (NL)	Thomas Hennessy (CnaG)	Myles Keogh (Ind.)	Thomas Lawlor (Lab)	Seán Lemass (FF)	Peadar Doyle (CnaG)
6th	1927 (Sep)	James Beckett (CnaG)	Robert Briscoe (FF)	Thomas Hennessy (CnaG)	Myles Keogh (CnaG)	Frank Kerlin (FF)	Seán Lemass (FF)	Peadar Doyle (CnaG)
7th	1932	James Beckett (CnaG)	Robert Briscoe (FF)	Thomas Hennessy (CnaG)	Myles Keogh (CnaG)	James Lynch (FF)	Seán Lemass (FF)	Peadar Doyle (CnaG)
8th	1933	James Beckett (CnaG)	Robert Briscoe (FF)	James McGuire (CnaG)	Thomas Kelly (FF)	James Lynch (FF)	Seán Lemass (FF)	Peadar Doyle (CnaG)
9th	1937	Myles Keogh (FG)	Robert Briscoe (FF)	Thomas Lawlor (Lab)	Thomas Kelly (FF)	Joseph Hannigan (Ind.)	Seán Lemass (FF)	Peadar Doyle (FG)
10th	1938	James Beckett (FG)	Robert Briscoe (FF)	James Lynch (FF)	Thomas Kelly (FF)	Joseph Hannigan (Ind.)	Seán Lemass (FF)	Peadar Doyle (FG)
10th	1939 by-election	John McCann (FF)	Robert Briscoe (FF)	James Lynch (FF)	Thomas Kelly (FF)	Joseph Hannigan (Ind.)	Seán Lemass (FF)	Peadar Doyle (FG)
11th	1943	Maurice Dockrell (FG)	Robert Briscoe (FF)	James Lynch (FF)	James Larkin Jnr (Lab)	John McCann (FF)	Seán Lemass (FF)	Peadar Doyle (FG)
12th	1944	Maurice Dockrell (FG)	Robert Briscoe (FF)	James Lynch (FF)	James Larkin Jnr (Lab)	John McCann (FF)	Seán Lemass (FF)	Peadar Doyle (FG)
13th	1948	Constituency abolished. See Dublin South-Central, Dublin South-East and Dublin South-West.						

Dáil	Election	Deputy (Party)	Deputy (Party)	Deputy (Party)	Deputy (Party)	Deputy (Party)
22nd	1981	Niall Andrews (FF)	Séamus Brennan (FF)	Nuala Fennell (FG)	John Kelly (FG)	Alan Shatter (FG)
23rd	1982 (Feb)	Niall Andrews (FF)	Séamus Brennan (FF)	Nuala Fennell (FG)	John Kelly (FG)	Alan Shatter (FG)
24th	1982 (Nov)	Niall Andrews (FF)	Séamus Brennan (FF)	Nuala Fennell (FG)	John Kelly (FG)	Alan Shatter (FG)
25th	1987	Tom Kitt (FF)	Séamus Brennan (FF)	Anne Colley (PDs)	John Kelly (FG)	Alan Shatter (FG)
26th	1989	Tom Kitt (FF)	Séamus Brennan (FF)	Nuala Fennell (FG)	Roger Garland (GP)	Alan Shatter (FG)
27th	1992	Tom Kitt (FF)	Séamus Brennan (FF)	Liz O'Donnell (PDs)	Eithne FitzGerald (Lab)	Alan Shatter (FG)
28th	1997	Tom Kitt (FF)	Séamus Brennan (FF)	Liz O'Donnell (PDs)	Olivia Mitchell (FG)	Alan Shatter (FG)
29th	2002	Tom Kitt (FF)	Séamus Brennan (FF)	Liz O'Donnell (PDs)	Olivia Mitchell (FG)	Eamon Ryan (GP)
30th	2007	Tom Kitt (FF)	Séamus Brennan (FF)	Alan Shatter (FG)	Olivia Mitchell (FG)	Eamon Ryan (GP)
30th	2009 by-election	Tom Kitt (FF)	George Lee (FG)	Alan Shatter (FG)	Olivia Mitchell (FG)	Eamon Ryan (GP)
31st	2011	Shane Ross (Ind.)	Peter Mathews (FG)	Alan Shatter (FG)	Olivia Mitchell (FG)	Alex White (Lab)
32nd	2016	Constituency abolished. See Dublin Rathdown, Dublin South-West and Dún Laoghaire.				
