= Patrick Chance =

Patrick Alexander Chance (1857–1919) was an Irish nationalist politician and member of parliament (MP) in the House of Commons of the United Kingdom of Great Britain and Ireland.

He was elected as an Irish Parliamentary Party MP for the South Kilkenny constituency at the 1885 general election. He was re-elected at the 1886 general election.

When the Irish Parliamentary Party split in 1890, he was an Anti-Parnellite and joined the Irish National Federation (INF) in 1891. He was re-elected as an INF MP at the 1892 general election. He resigned on 21 August 1894 and the by-election for his seat was won by Samuel Morris.

Parliament of the United Kingdom
New constituency	Member of Parliament for South Kilkenny; 1885 – 1894	Succeeded by Samuel Morris
