= Irish Dominion League =

Irish political movement (1919–1921)

- Leader: Sir Horace Plunkett
- Founded: 1919
- Dissolved: 1921
- Merger of: Irish Centre Party and Irish Reconstruction Association
- Newspaper: Irish Statesman
- Ideology: United Ireland; Irish unionism
- Political position: Centrist

The Irish Dominion League was an Irish political party and movement in Britain and Ireland which advocated Dominion status for Ireland within the British Empire, and opposed partition of Ireland into separate southern and northern jurisdictions. It attracted modest support from middle-class Dubliners of moderate unionist and nationalist backgrounds, anxious to achieve a compromise in the face of the escalating conflict between the Irish Republican Army and the British. It operated between 1919 and 1921.

== History of the League ==
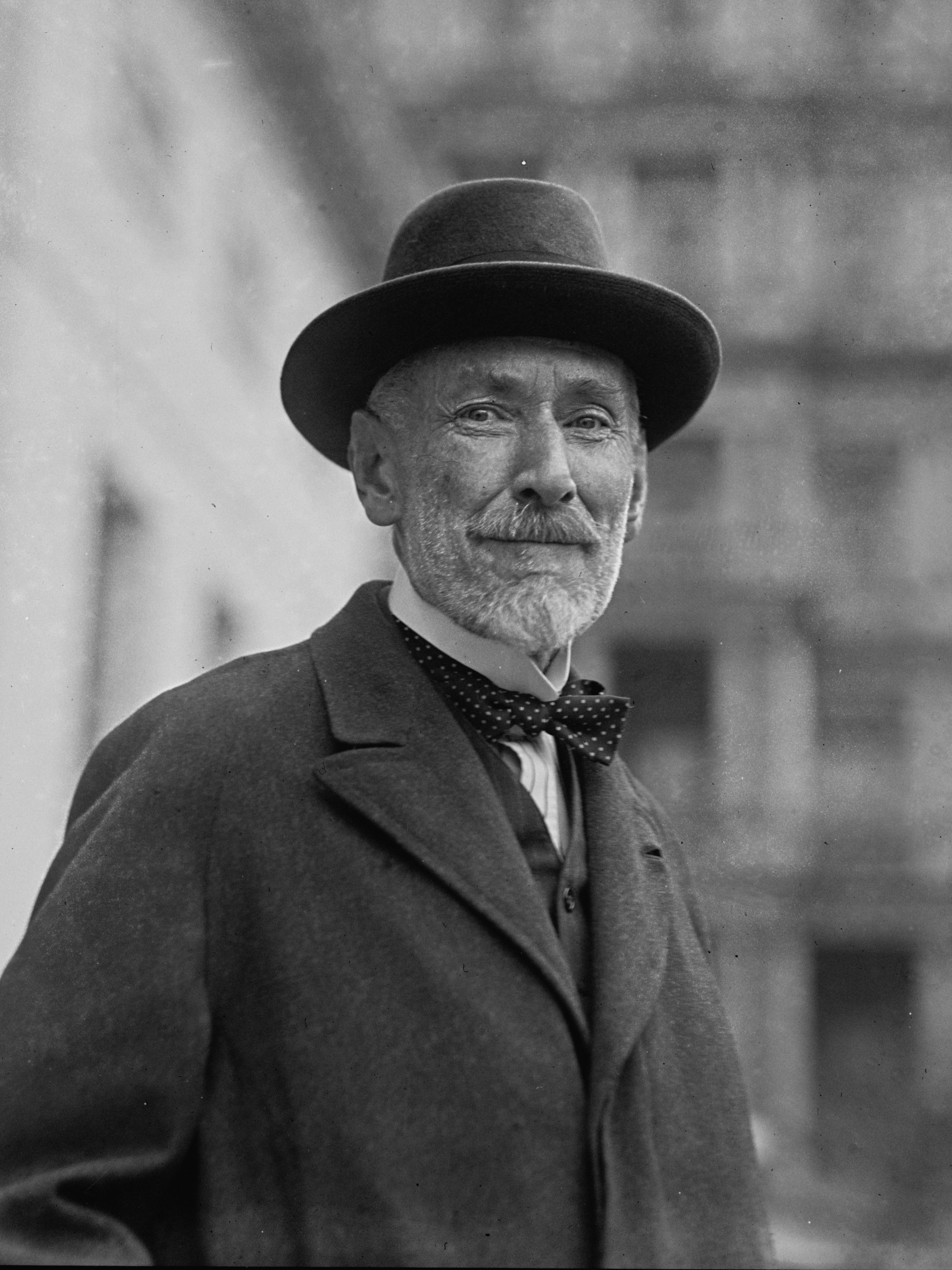
Horace Plunkett acted as the main force behind the Irish Dominion League

The League was launched in June 1919 by Sir Horace Plunkett, with a 12-point manifesto signed by Plunkett and 43 others, including many who had participated in the Irish Convention of 1917–18 and several Anglo-Irish members of the House of Lords. Plunkett had founded the Irish Reconstruction Association at the time of the November 1918 election, after the failure of the Irish Convention. The new League merged the Irish Reconstruction Association with the Irish Centre Party, founded months earlier by Stephen Gwynn, formerly of the pro-Home Rule Irish Parliamentary Party. The Unionist Anti-Partition League of St John Brodrick, 1st Earl of Midleton discussed joining but decided the platform was too nationalist. The founders also approached John Dillon but were rebuffed. Many of the League's senior members were drawn from the Irish Agricultural Organisation Society.

The manifesto was based on an earlier "Proposals for an Irish Settlement" drafted anonymously by Diarmuid Coffey and Frank Cruise O'Brien (father of Conor Cruise O'Brien). The chairman of the London committee of the League, Thomas Spring Rice, 2nd Baron Monteagle of Brandon, introduced a Dominion of Ireland Bill in the House of Lords in 1920 in line with the League's views. The debate surrounding the proposed bill helped to raise the prominence of the League, although it failed to gain support in the British parliament. Monteagle's bill was defeated at second reading on 1 July 1920 and the government of David Lloyd George proceeded instead with its own bill, which became the Government of Ireland Act 1920. The League was dissolved in November 1921 following the establishment of the Irish Free State. In 1922 Warre B. Wells wrote, "The Irish Dominion League did not attract a great deal of active support in Ireland, but it was hardly expected to do so inasmuch as it was chiefly a propagandist organisation". Within Ireland, the moderate position of the League failed to convince sufficient members of either the unionist or nationalist communities to support its position. At Westminster, the League's small group of supporters were caught between the more numerous Liberals, who believed that the partition of Ireland should take place, and the Conservatives, who argued against any home rule for Ireland.

== Irish Statesman ==
The Irish Statesman, a weekly journal promoting the views of the Irish Dominion League, ran from 27 June 1919 to June 1920. It was edited by Warre B. Wells, with contributions from W. B. Yeats, George Bernard Shaw, and George William Russell. The League's manifesto was first published in the journal's first issue. The title was revived in 1923, after the League was defunct, with the new series running till 1930.
