= 1923 Dublin South by-election =

By-election to the 4th Dáil

- 25 October 1923
- Turnout: 35,178 (45.1%)
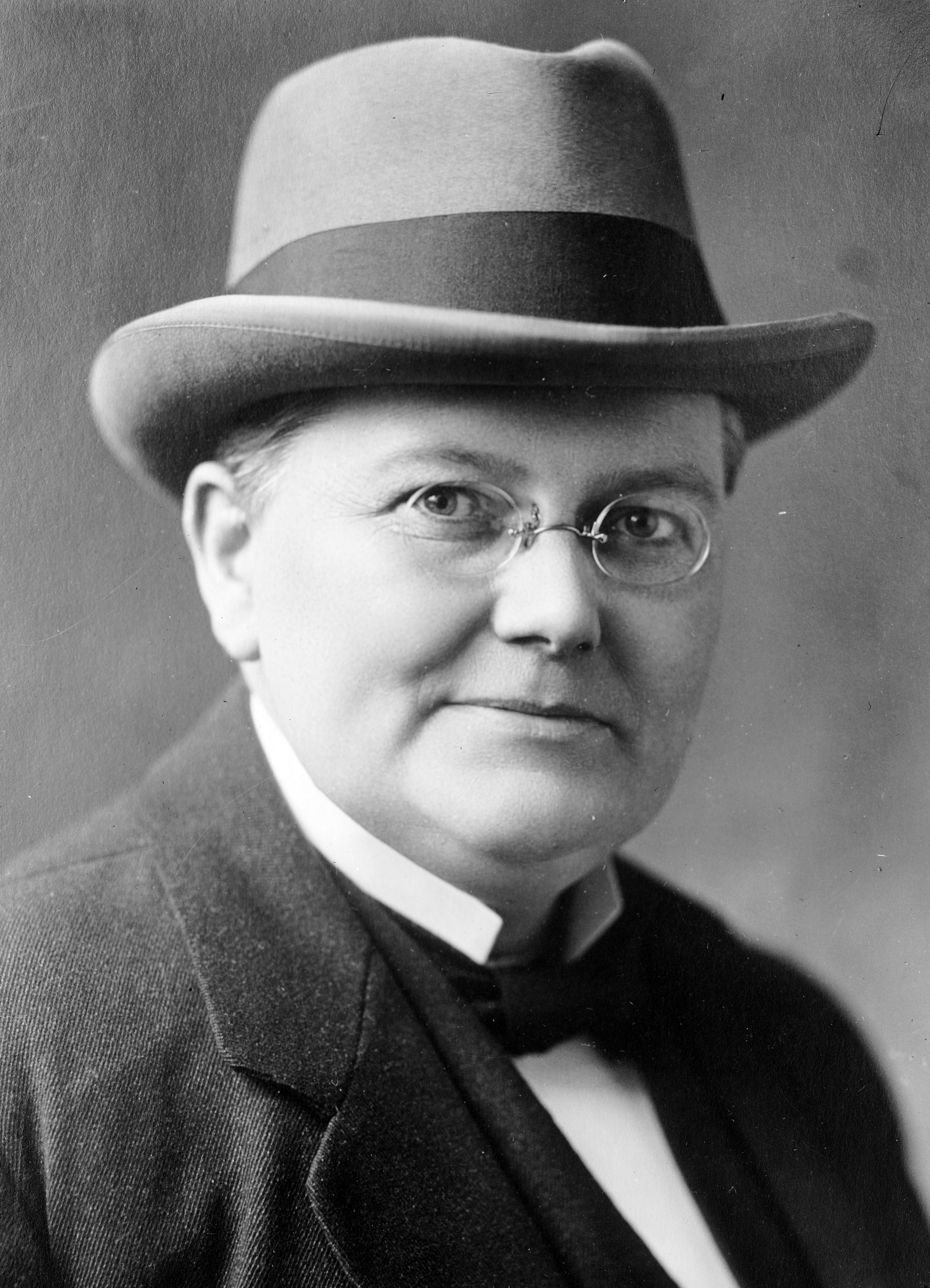
| | | O'Mullane |
| Nominee | Hugh Kennedy | Michael O'Mullane |
| Party | Cumann na nGaedheal | Republican |
| First preferences | 23,676 | 11,502 |
| Percentage | 67.3% | 32.7% |
TD before election
Michael Hayes
Cumann na nGaedheal
TD after election
Hugh Kennedy
Cumann na nGaedheal

A Dáil by-election was held in the constituency of Dublin South in the Irish Free State on Thursday, 25 October 1923, to fill a vacancy in the 4th Dáil. It followed the resignation of Michael Hayes of Cumann na nGaedheal, after being elected for another constituency.

At the 1923 general election, Hayes was elected as a Teachta Dála (TD) for both Dublin South and the National University of Ireland (NUI). He chose to sit for the NUI, vacating his Dublin South seat when the 4th Dáil met on 19 September 1923. This was in accordance with section 55 of the Electoral Act 1923.

Dublin South was a seven seat constituency which included the borough electoral areas of Dublin 3, 5, 7, 9, and 10, being the wards of Fitzwilliam, Mansion House, Royal Exchange, South City, Merchant's Quay, New Kilmainham, Usher's Quay, Wood Quay, South Dock and Trinity.

A government motion to issue the writ of election to fill the vacancy was agreed on 3 October 1923. The by-election was held on 25 October 1923, and was won by Cumann na nGaedheal candidate Hugh Kennedy.

Kennedy had been serving as Attorney General since 31 January 1922, having been appointed first by the Provisional Government of Ireland, and then on 7 December 1922 by the Executive Council of the Irish Free State.

This was the first by-election held under the Electoral Act 1923, and the first election to any parliament since the 1918 general election in the area which became the Irish Free State.

== Result ==
1923 Dublin South by-election
| Party | Candidate | FPv% | Count |
| Party | Candidate | FPv% | 1 |
|---|---|---|---|
| Cumann na nGaedheal | Hugh Kennedy | 67.3 | 23,676 |
| Republican | Michael O'Mullane | 32.7 | 11,502 |
Electorate: 78,017 Valid: 35,178 Quota: 17,590 Turnout: 45.1%

== Aftermath ==
Kennedy himself resigned as a TD on 5 June 1924 to take office as the first Chief Justice of Ireland. The November 1924 Dublin South by-election was held to fill the vacancy.
