= Máighréad Ní Annagáin =

- Born: 2 May 1875; Láithreach, Na Déise, County Waterford
- Died: 27 January 1952 (aged 76); Mater Misericordiae nursing home, Eccles Street, Dublin
- Occupations: Folksong collector and performer

Máighréad Ní Annagáin (2 May 1875 – 27 January 1952) was an Irish folk music collector and performer.

== Biography ==
Máighréad Ní Annagáin was born in Láithreach, Na Déise, County Waterford on 2 May 1875. Her parents were Michael, a carpenter, and Mary Hannigan (née Murray). She was a native Irish-speaker and both sides of her family had a tradition of musicians. She was educated at the Mercy Convent School, Dungarvan, and later spent time living and studying in France. When she returned to Ireland, she studied music in Cork, training as a classical soprano. She devoted herself to traditional Irish music, much of which she learnt from her father. In 1900 she won a singing competition at the Dungarvan Feis, and a gold medal in the Oireachtas competition in 1901 with the song Éamonn an Chnoic. After this, she dedicated herself to professional singing full time. She performed across Ireland, as well as Scotland and England. She regularly served as an adjudicator at feiseanna. She performed at the Oireachtas in 1906, 1913, 1917 and 1919.

She became a close friend of the poet Riobard Bheldon from 1901, with him sending her any new poem or song he thought would suit her. After she won at the Oireachtas competition, he composed the song Do Mháiréad Ní Annagáin, later writing Do Mháiréad arís and Máiréad agus an Londubh. Ní Annagáin performed on the opening night of the new radio station 2RN.

She married Seamus Clandillon on 19 January 1904, with whom she published a number of song books. They had three sons and two daughters. They lived at San Salvador, Newtown Park Avenue, Blackrock, County Dublin. Ní Annagáin died in the Mater Misericordiae nursing home on 27 January 1952 and is buried in Glasnevin Cemetery.
