= Alice Cashel =

Irish nationalist

- Born: Alice Cashel; 17 July 1878; Parsontown, County Offaly, Ireland
- Died: 22 February 1958 (aged 79); Galway, Ireland
- Other names: Miss Armstrong

Alice Mary Cashel (17 July 1878 – 22 February 1958) was an Irish nationalist, County Councillor and judge. She was a founding member, with Annie McSwiney, of the Cork Cumann na mBan.

== Early life ==
Born 17 July 1878 in Birr, County Offaly (then Parsonstown, King's County), Cashel's parents were the station master Blennerhassett Cashel of County Tipperary and Maria Agnes Lyons of County Cork. She became a teacher and studied for a degree from the Royal University of Ireland. In 1895 her sister Agnes Cashel married the Sinn Féin politician James O'Mara.

== Republican activism ==
Cashel joined the Sinn Féin party in 1907. She was a member with many of the significant names in Cork. With Annie McSwiney she formed the Cork branch of Cumann na mBan about 1914 and she was secretary to the founding of the Cork branch of the Irish Volunteers. She was at the time living in Ballingeary but she gave her cottage to Sean Hegarty when he was ordered out of Cork by the British. He and his wife lived there for many years. By 1916 Cashel was living in Limerick and learned of the Easter Rising from Hegarty when she visited him for the Easter holiday.

She contacted Thomas McCurtain who sent her to the Headquarters where she was given orders from Tadgh Barry. She was told to use a Protestant name to gain cars from a local garage. The cars were to go to Kerry to collect the arms coming in on the Aud. Once word reached them that Roger Casement was arrested and the guns gone there was no need to source the cars. Cashel waited on further orders while the Rising happened in Dublin. The confusion caused by the recall of the orders meant that there was little or no activity in Cork. Cashel was updated by McSwiney towards the end of the week. She collected a write up from Hegarty and although she had to memorise it and destroy the original to get it to the US she successfully wrote it out again and gave it to John Devoy when she reached New York City. The US trip had been planned before the Rising. Cashel had planned to visit Canada and to get there via NY. She did not return to Ireland until January 1917 and she took up a teaching post in the McSwiney School for girls, St. Ita's in Cork.

By 1918 Cashel had moved to Galway where she was living with her brother in law who asked her to assist his son in the Armagh elections. She was an organiser for cumann na mBan there, setting up the Newry branch. She was called to join Éamon de Valera and Seán MacEntee in Derry. Cashel was to follow them on a tour of the country to set up branches. All the Donegal branches were set up by Cashel. She also worked a Tyrone election and worked the Monaghan and Cavan election with MacEntee and Count Plunkett. One of her meetings was raided by the police who destroyed the stage she stood on and since the Royal Irish Constabulary had promised to arrest her, Cashel ended on the run from them for several months. In December 1918, she spoke on a platform with Alice Milligan, in support of Winifred Carney standing in Belfast Victoria—with Constance Markievicz in Dublin, one of only two women endorsed by Sinn Féin.’

Cashel's brother in law James O'Mara became a member of the first Dáil Éireann in Jan 1919. Later in the year he was once more sent to the US to work with DeValera and she was to run his new oyster business and to lie low for a while.

Her identity was well known to the police locally who were concerned she would land guns from America. The house was raided during this time. However Cashel was mostly working on a thesis about holy wells and several confiscated documents were purely about this. She was arrested and help in jail for a week or so during the time in Galway.

== County Councillor and Council Vice-Chairman ==
As a result of her incarceration Cashel was co-opted as a Sinn Féin member of Galway County Council in June 1920. On 7 June 1920 she was co-opted onto Clifden District Council. She was immediately elected as vice-chairman of Galway County Council on 19 June 1920, a position she retained until 1921. By March 1921 she was acting Chairman of the Council due to the arrest of the Chairman George Nicholl.

She also reformed a branch of the Volunteers and gave them their orders. One of their duties was to get the poteen trade under control in the area.

Eventually her home was raided by the Black and Tans. Cashel escaped and made her way to Dublin. Once there the family business had reason to send her to France where she was able to confer with Seán T. O'Kelly in Paris. Cashel returned to Galway where she over turned an agreement known as the Galway resolution which had repudiated the authority of the Dail. Cashel was arrested in January when she tried to attend a council meeting. Dr Ada English was also arrested on the same day, 19 January 1921. They were imprisoned with Anita MacMahon, of Achill. Cashel was detained until 25 July 1921.

Once released Cashel moved to Dublin where she worked for Erskine Childers' office. At that time she used the name Armstrong since her own name was too well known. She predominately worked in propaganda offices until the treaty was signed. She returned to Galway and promptly objected to the council's support for the treaty.

== Judge of Dáil Courts ==
Cashel was also elected in a Convention in Galway as a judge in the Dáil Courts (polling the second highest number of votes at the convention) and served as a "Parish Justice" in Connemara.

== Later life ==
In 1935 Cashel published a YA novel which was widely used in Irish schools. The story is set just before and during the 1916 Easter Rising through a family in the west of Ireland.

Cashel lived in St. Catherine's, Roundstone, County Galway. She died on 22 February 1958 at the Regional Hospital, Galway and was buried with honours on 25 February 1958 in New Cemetery, Bohermore, Galway.

== Bibliography ==
- The Lights of Leaca Bán. Dublin, Browne and Nolan, 1935. National Library of Ireland.
