= Stephen Gwynn =

Irish journalist and politician

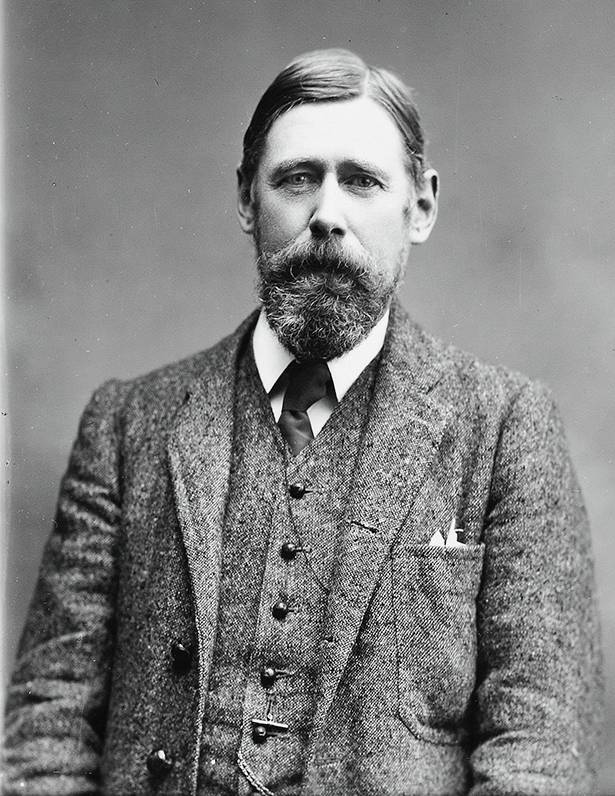

Member of Parliament for Galway Borough
- In office 3 November 1906 – 14 December 1918
- Preceded by: Charles Ramsay Devlin
- Succeeded by: Constituency abolished

Personal details
- Born: 13 February 1864 St Columba's College, Dublin
- Died: 11 June 1950 (aged 86) Terenure, Dublin
- Party: Irish Parliamentary Party (before 1919); Irish Centre Party (1919); Irish Dominion League (1919)
- Education: Brasenose College, Oxford

Military service
- Allegiance: United Kingdom of Great Britain and Ireland
- Branch/service: British Army
- Years of service: 1915–1919
- Rank: Captain
- Unit: Prince of Wales's Leinster Regiment (Royal Canadians); Connaught Rangers
- Battles/wars: First World War
- Awards: Legion of Honour (1915)

Stephen Lucius Gwynn (13 February 1864 – 11 June 1950) was an Irish journalist, biographer, author, poet and Protestant Nationalist politician. As a member of the Irish Parliamentary Party he represented Galway Borough as its Member of Parliament from 1906 to 1918. He served as a British Army officer in France during World War I and was a prominent proponent of Irish involvement in the Allied war effort. He founded the Irish Centre Party in 1919, but his moderate nationalism was eclipsed by the growing popularity of Sinn Féin.

== Family background ==
Stephen Gwynn was born in Saint Columba's College in Rathfarnham, south County Dublin, where his father John Gwynn (1827–1917), a biblical scholar and Church of Ireland clergyman, was warden. His mother Lucy Josephine (1840–1907) was the daughter of the Irish nationalist William Smith O'Brien. Stephen was the eldest of ten children (eight brothers and two sisters). Shortly after his birth the family moved to Ramelton in County Donegal to the parish where his father had been appointed parson; he later became Regius Professor of Divinity at Trinity College Dublin.

== Early years ==
Stephen Gwynn spent his early childhood in rural County Donegal, which was to shape his later view of Ireland. He went to Brasenose College, Oxford, where, as scholar, in 1884 he was awarded first-class honours in classical moderations and in 1886 literae humaniores. During term holidays he returned to Dublin, where he met several of the political and literary figures of the day.

== Professional life ==
After graduating Gwynn spent ten years from 1886 tutoring as a schoolmaster, for a time in France, which created a lifelong interest in French culture, as expressed in his Praise of France (1927). By 1896 he had developed an interest in writing, becoming a writer and journalist in London focused on English themes, until he came into contact with the emerging Irish Literary Revival, when he served as secretary of the Irish Literary Society.

This was the beginning of a long and prolific career as a writer covering a wide range of literary genres, from poetry and biographical subjects to general historical works. The eighteenth century was his particular specialism. He wrote numerous books on travel and on the topography of his own homeland, as well as on his other interests: wine, eighteenth-century painting and fishing.

Gwynn returned to Ireland in 1904 when he entered politics. In a by-election in November 1906 he won a seat for Galway Borough, which he represented as a member of the Irish Parliamentary Party until 1918. During this period he was active in the Gaelic League and was one of the few Irish MPs to have close links to the Irish literary revival. Along with Joseph Maunsel Hone and George Roberts he founded the Dublin publishing house of Maunsel and Company. He was opposed to the demand for Irish as a compulsory subject for matriculation. He supported the campaign which won the establishment of a Catholic university when he served on the Irish University Royal Commission in 1908. During the debate on the third Home Rule Bill, Gwynn at the request of his party leader John Redmond wrote The case for Home Rule (1911) and was in charge of much of the party's official publicity and its replies to criticism from Sinn Féin.

== Great War ==
On the outbreak of World War I in August 1914 Gwynn strongly supported Redmond's encouragement of Irish nationalists and the Irish National Volunteers to support the Allied and British war effort by enlisting in Irish regiments of the Irish Divisions, especially as a means to ensure the implementation of the suspended Home Rule Act at the end of an expectedly short war. Gwynn, now over fifty, enlisted in January 1915 with the 7th Leinster Regiment in the 16th (Irish) Division. In July he was commissioned as a captain in the 6th (Service) Battalion, Connaught Rangers and served with them on the Western Front at Messines, the Somme and elsewhere.

He was one of five Irish Nationalist MPs who enlisted and served in the army, the others being J. L. Esmonde, Willie Redmond, William Redmond and D. D. Sheehan, as well as former MP Tom Kettle. Together with Kettle and William Redmond he undertook a recruitment drive for the Irish divisions, co-operating with Kettle on a collection of ballads called Battle songs for the Irish Brigade (1915). Gwynn was made a chevalier of the Légion d'honneur in July 1915.

In 1916 he was appointed to the Dardanelles Commission.

Recalled to Ireland in late 1917 to participate in the Irish Convention chaired by Sir Horace Plunkett, he sided with the Redmondite faction of the Irish Party in supporting a compromise with the southern unionists in an attempt to reach consensus on a Home Rule settlement which would avoid partition. On the death of Redmond in March 1918, Gwynn took over as leader of the moderate nationalists in the Convention. He opposed the threat of compulsory military service during the Conscription Crisis of 1918, though as a member of the Irish Recruiting Council he continued to support voluntary recruitment, encountering intense opposition led by Sinn Féin.

== Latter years ==
Stephen Gwynn formed the Irish Centre Party in 1919 and stood unsuccessfully as an Independent Nationalist for Dublin University in the December general elections. The party merged with Plunkett's Irish Dominion League to press for a settlement by consent on the basis of dominion status, but Gwynn subsequently broke with Plunkett due to his willingness to accept partition as a temporary compromise. The polarities which divided Ireland during the Anglo-Irish War and Irish Civil War increasingly sidelined Gwynn's brand of moderate cultural nationalism. Although he supported the newly emergent nation he equally condemned some of the excesses, such as the burning of houses belonging to Free State senators.

Gwynn's personal life also became complicated at this stage and around 1920, he had a romantic association with married artist Grace Henry who was perhaps the best known female artist in Ireland at the time. During this period Gwynn and Grace went travelling in France and Italy and at various stages in his life Henry painted portraits of Gwynn including a very distinguished looking Gwynn in his late 60s or early 70s. Their relationship contributed significantly to the separation of Henry from her artist husband Paul Henry in 1930.

During the 1920s, Gwynn also devoted himself to writing, covering political events as Irish correspondent to The Observer and The Times. Later in his career he wrote some substantial works, and together with his son Denis Gwynn (The Life of John Redmond, 1932) did much to shape the retrospective image and self-justification of John Redmond. In the mid-1930s he authored three books with a connecting theme of fishing with the artist Roy Beddington serving as illustrator: The Happy Fisherman (1936), From River to River (1937), and Two in a Valley (1938). In a review in The Guardian of the latter work, critic Gilbert Thomas wrote:

'Two in a Valley'—a handsome quarto—is the sketch-book of a successfully 'atmospheric' artist in black and white. Mr. Gwynn's accompanying letterpress, setting down the impressions of a comparative stranger in the Coln Valley, is slight, and sometimes, quite irrelevantly, he follows a red herring—or more precisely a trout! But even when most discursive he is good company... He brings both freshness and penetration of observation to the Cotswold scene, where as much as anywhere on our island, the works of Nature and man are one.

Stephen Gwynn was awarded an honorary D.Litt. by the National University of Ireland in 1940, and a Litt.D. by the University of Dublin in 1945. The Irish Academy of Letters awarded him the Gregory Medal in April 1950. In his literary writings he stood for a humanism and tolerance, which qualities, due to political upheavals, were relatively rare in the Ireland of his day. He died on 11 June 1950 at his home in Terenure, Dublin and was buried at Tallaght cemetery, south County Dublin.

== Family ==
Stephen Gwynn married his cousin Mary Louisa (d. 1941), daughter of Revd. James Gwynn. She later converted to Catholicism. They had three sons and two daughters who were brought up in her religion, of whom Aubrey (1892–1983) became a Jesuit priest and professor of medieval history at University College Dublin. Their second son Denis Rolleston (1893–1971) was professor of modern Irish history at University College, Cork.

Stephen Gwynn's brother Edward John (1868–1941) became provost of Trinity College and another brother Robin (Robert Malcolm) became its senior dean. His sister Lucy Gwynn was the first woman registrar of Trinity. A third brother, Charles, had a successful career in the British Army and retired as a Major General. Younger brothers Lucius and Jack were noted cricketers.

== Photographs ==
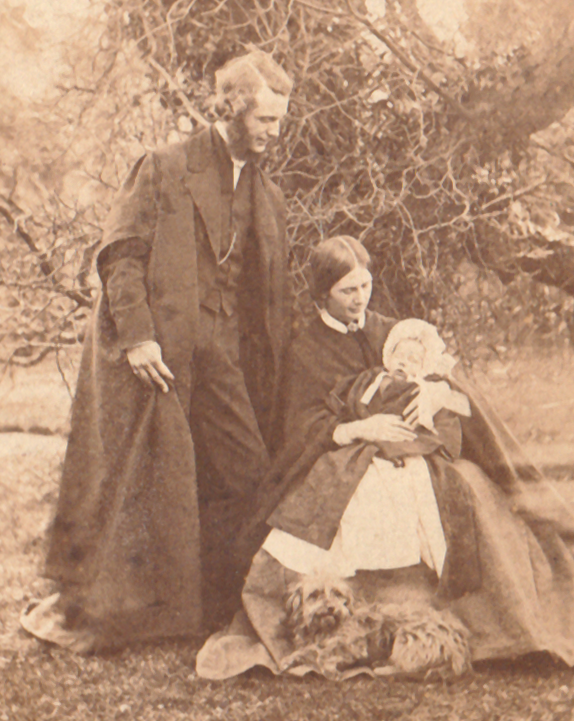
Stephen Gwynn as a baby, with his parents John and Lucy Gwynn, 1864

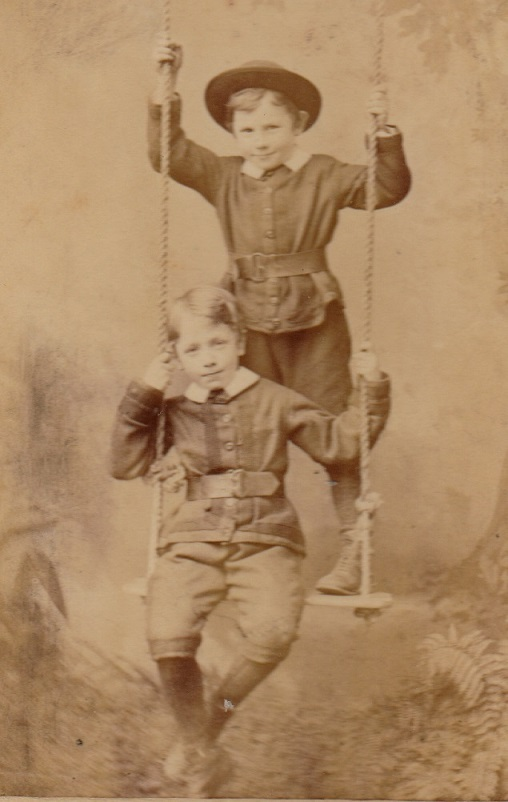
Stephen and his brother Edward as boys, c.1874

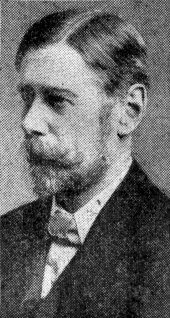
Stephen Gwynn as MP, c. 1906

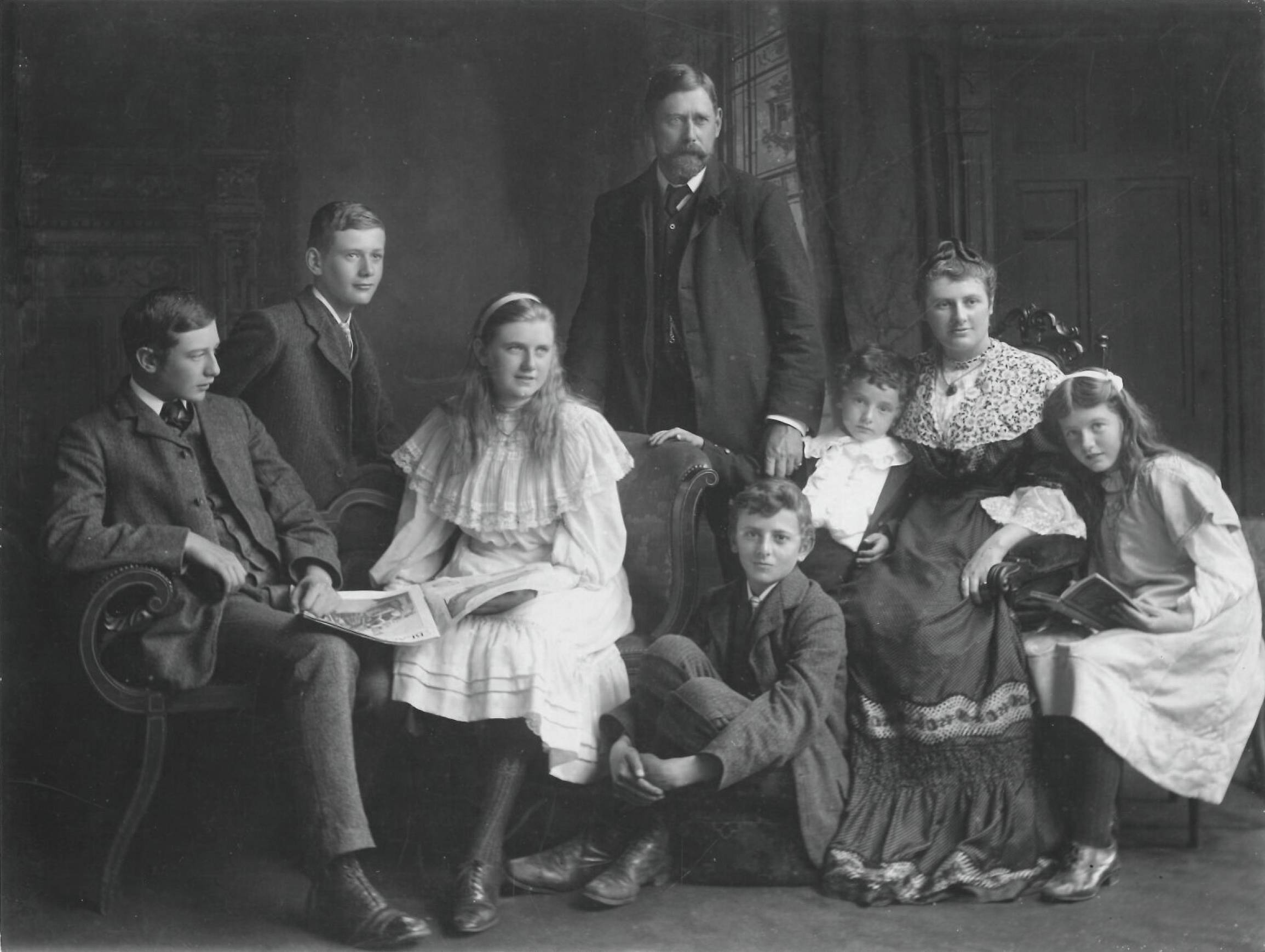
Stephen Gwynn with his family, 1906

== Works ==
- Memorials of an Eighteenth Century Painter (James Northcote) (1898)
- Highways and Byways in Donegal and Antrim (1899)
- Tennyson (1899)
- The decay of Sensibility (1900)
- The Old Knowledge (1901)
- The Queen's Chronicler (1901) (collection of poems)
- Today and Tomorrow in Ireland (1903)
- Henry Grattan and his Times (1904; reissued 1971)
- The Masters of English Literature (1904)
- Thomas Moore (1905)
- The fair hills of Ireland (1906; second edition 1914)
- A Holiday in Connemara (1909)
- Robert Emmet: a historical romance (1909)
- The case for Home Rule (1911) (introduction by John Redmond)
- Beautiful Ireland: Pictured by Alexander Williams; described by Stephen Gwynn (1911)
- Battle Songs for the Irish Brigade (1915), (collected, with Tom Kettle)
- The Famous Cities of Ireland, with illustrations by Hugh Thomson (1915)
- "A memoir of the author" in Mabel Dearmer, Letters from a field hospital. With a memoir of the author by Stephen Gwynn. (1915)
- Mrs. Humphry Ward. First American Edition, Henry Holt & Co. (1917)
- For Second Reading: Attempts to Please (1918)
- John Redmond's last years (1919)
- The Irish Situation (1921)
- History of Ireland (1923)
- Collected poems (1923)
- Ireland (1924)
- Experiences of a Literary Man (autobiography) (1926)
- In Praise of France (1927)
- The Scholar's Treasury: a Book of Irish Poetry (1927)
- The Charm of Ireland (1927)
- Captain Scott (1929)
- The Letters and Friendships of Sir Cecil Spring Rice (1929)
- Ulster, Munster, Leinster (1930)
- Burgundy; with chapters on the Jura and Savoy (1930)
- The Life of Mary Kingsley (1930; reissued 1932), for which Gwynn was awarded the James Tait Black Memorial Prize
- Sir Walter Scott (1930)
- The Life of Horace Walpole (1932)
- The life and friendship of Dean Swift (1933)
- The Charm of Ireland (revised edition) (1934)
- Oliver Goldsmith (1935)
- Ireland in Ten Days (1935)
- Irish Literature and Drama in the English Language (1936)
- The Happy Fisherman (1936),
- From River to River (1937)
- Two in a Valley (1938)
- Dublin Old and New (1938)
- Robert Louis Stevenson (1939)
- Salute to Valour (1941)
- Aftermath (1946)
- Memories of Enjoyment (1946)

== Biographical sources ==
- "Gwynn, Stephen Lucius" . Thom's Irish Who's Who . Dublin: Alexander Thom and Son Ltd. 1923. p. 100 – via Wikisource.
- Biography in The long Gestation, Irish Nationalist life 1891–1918 P. Maume (1999), pp. 229–230
- A Dictionary of Irish History since 1800, D. J. Hickey & J. E. Doherty, Gill & MacMillan (1980)
- A Dictionary of Irish Biography, 3rd ed. Henry Boylan (1998)
- Oxford Directory of Biographies (2004), vol.24
- Spiritually Hyphenated: Stephen Gwynn and his Family Background, Roger Gwynn, Acre Press (2019)
- The Lost World of Stephen Gwynn: Irish Constitutional Nationalism and Cultural Politics, 1864–1950, C. Ried, Manchester UP (2015)

Parliament of the United Kingdom
Preceded by Charles Ramsay Devlin	Member of Parliament for Galway Borough; 1906–1918	Constituency abolished
