= 1894 South Kilkenny by-election =

UK parliamentary by-election

The 1894 South Kilkenny by-election was a parliamentary by-election held for the United Kingdom House of Commons constituency of South Kilkenny on 7 September 1894. The vacancy arose because of the resignation of the sitting member, Patrick Chance of the Irish National Federation. Only one candidate was nominated, Samuel Morris representing the Irish National Federation, who was elected unopposed.

== Result ==
1894 South Kilkenny by-election
Party	Candidate	Votes	%	±%
Irish National Federation	Samuel Morris	Unopposed	N/A	N/A
Irish National Federation hold				
