= 1909 South Kilkenny by-election =

UK Parliamentary by-election

The 1909 South Kilkenny by-election was held on 10 August 1909. The by-election was held due to the incumbent Irish Parliamentary MP, Nicholas Joseph Murphy, being declared bankrupt. It was won by the Irish Parliamentary candidate Matthew Keating, being elected unopposed.
