= 1907 South Kilkenny by-election =

UK Parliamentary by-election

The 1907 South Kilkenny by-election was held on 29 July 1907. The by-election was held due to the resignation of the incumbent Irish Parliamentary Party MP, James O'Mara, who joined Sinn Féin. It was won by the Irish Parliamentary Party candidate Nicholas Joseph Murphy, who was unopposed.
