= Irish Centre Party (1919) =

Defunct federalist political party in Ireland

- Leader: Stephen Gwynn
- Founded: January 1919
- Dissolved: June 1919 (merged to form Irish Dominion League)
- Ideology: United Ireland; Irish federalism Irish independence British Imperialism
- Political position: Centrist

The Irish Centre Party was a short-lived federalist political party in Ireland which advocated establishing a federal structure for a self-governing Ireland within the British Empire. It was founded in 1919 by Stephen Gwynn and merged with the Irish Dominion League later that year.

== History and aims ==
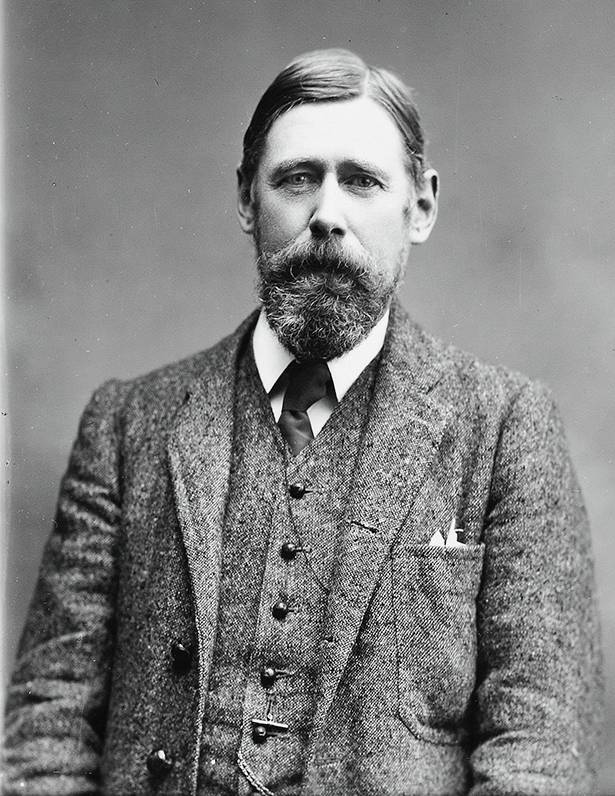
Party founder Stephen Gwynn

The Irish Centre Party was established in January 1919 against the backdrop of the Irish War of Independence and the division of the Irish Unionist Alliance. The party was founded by Stephen Gwynn, who became chair of its provisional general committee, and was dominated by professional men and women, most of whom were from moderate, middle-class Dublin families. It gained limited prominence through its most notable member, Sir Hubert Gough, who had been closely involved in the 1914 Curragh incident.

Part of the wider Irish Home Rule movement, the Centre Party's federal programme recognised that the Irish constitutional debate had fundamentally altered since the Edwardian period. The party's primary aim was not to redesign the Union to accommodate Ireland, but instead to reconcile Ireland's internal divisions. The party advanced a programme advocating the creation of a self-governing Ireland within the British Empire, with a central parliament in Dublin for national affairs and four provincial assemblies to tackle local issues. This had been the basis of a scheme that the Irish Convention received from Joseph Alexander Moles, an Ulster-born businessman, which Gwynn immediately supported. The Centre Party argued that this federal system would allow the interests of both the Protestant and Roman Catholic communities to be adequately represented, while preventing the division of Ireland and recognising its place in the empire. It has since been described by Colin Reid as the "party of constitutional nationalism."

The Centre Party failed to gain sufficient membership to make it a prominent force in Irish politics. The principle of a federal Ireland had limited appeal to nationalists, especially in Sinn Féin, who feared that it would undermine the political and territorial integrity of an Irish state. For unionists, the federalist solution proposed the break-up of the Union with Great Britain, which they opposed. The party's poor level of support led Gwynn to enter negotiations with other moderate political movements. Encouraged by Lord Monteagle, in June 1919 the Irish Centre Party merged with Sir Horace Plunkett's dominion movement to form the Irish Dominion League, a political party which survived until 1921.
