= Mary Olivia Kennedy =

Irish-born journalist, first woman staff reporter of The Times

- Born: 17 September 1880; Dublin, Ireland
- Died: 18 December 1943 (aged 63); Dublin, Ireland
- Education: Loreto College, St Stephen's Green; University College Dublin
- Occupation: Journalist
- Known for: First woman staff reporter of The Times
- Relatives: Hugh Kennedy (brother)
- Writing career
- Genre: Non-fiction
- Subject: Fashion

Mary Olivia Kennedy (17 September 1880, Dublin – 18 December 1943, Dublin) was a journalist based in Dublin and London, and the first woman staff reporter of The Times newspaper.

== Biography ==
Kennedy was a daughter of a surgeon, Hugh Boyle Kennedy, and younger sister of Hugh Kennedy, first Chief Justice of the Irish Free State from 1924 to 1936. She attended Loreto College, St Stephen's Green, Dublin, and like her brother, attended University College Dublin, graduating with an honours degree.

Kennedy was the theatre critic and book reviewer for the Dublin Evening Mail and the Dublin Daily Express. She then moved to London and was editor of the theatre page for the Sunday paper London Budget. She was later also fashion editor of Vanity Fair and the Pall Mall Gazette woman's page editor. She was a theatre critic for Nash's Magazine and contributor to various magazines, including The Strand Magazine and The Times'.

Having contributed to The Times since May 1914, on 1 February 1917 Kennedy became its first woman staff reporter, working in the editorial team until 31 March 1942.

In 1917, Kennedy was sent as a special correspondent to France to report on women's activities at bases and WAAC camps. During World War I, she wrote a number of articles on women's war work utilised by the authorities in neutral countries, and assisted several women's organisations. As a Times journalist, Kennedy wrote mainly on subjects of interest to women but also on other matters. She originated the Round the Shops columns that ran from 7 November 1921 until 12 January 1942 and wrote the London Fashions articles between 14 February 1923 until at least 1 October 1930.

As well as contributing to book The Times History of the War, Kennedy published two textbooks, France (1789-1815) and Histories of England and Ireland for Intermediate Examinations. She also edited editions of Selected Poems of André Chénier and Tennyson's Morte d'Arthur.

After a long and distinguished career as a professional journalist, Kennedy retired in 1942 and returned to Dublin. She died on 18 December 1943 after a long illness; her brother predeceased her. Her obituary was published in The Times on 23 December 1943.
