= Nicholas Joseph Murphy =

Nicholas Joseph Murphy (1880 – 27 April 1913) was an Irish nationalist politician and a Member of Parliament (MP) for South Kilkenny from 1907 to 1909.

His parents were publican and grocers, Nicholas became a Grocer and Spirit Merchant. He was educated at St. Kieran's College.

He was elected unopposed as an Irish Parliamentary Party MP for South Kilkenny at the 1907 by-election, following the resignation of James O'Mara who joined Sinn Féin.

He resigned in 1909 after being declared bankrupt, and was succeeded by Matthew Keating.

He stood unsuccessfully as an Independent Nationalist candidate at the December 1910 general election against Matthew Keating.

Parliament of the United Kingdom
Preceded by James O'Mara	Member of Parliament for South Kilkenny; 1907–1909	Succeeded by Matthew Keating
