= 1906 Galway Borough by-election =

UK Parliamentary by-election

- 3 November 1906

Galway Borough for UK Parliament
- Turnout: 70.0%
	First party	Second party
Candidate	Stephen Gwynn	Frank Shawe-Taylor
Party	Irish Parliamentary	Independent Nationalist
Popular vote	983	559
Percentage	63.7%	36.3%

The 1906 Galway Borough by-election was held on 3 November 1906. The by-election was held due to the resignation of the incumbent Irish Parliamentary MP, Charles Ramsay Devlin, in order to return to Canada. It was won by the Irish Parliamentary candidate Stephen Gwynn.

1906 Galway Borough by-election
Party	Candidate	Votes	%	±%
Irish Parliamentary	Stephen Gwynn	983	63.7	N/A
Ind. Nationalist	John Shawe-Taylor	559	36.3	New
Majority		424	27.4	N/A
Turnout		1,542	70.0	N/A
Registered electors		2,202		
Irish Parliamentary hold		Swing	N/A	
