= Samuel Morris (Irish politician) =

Samuel Morris (1846 – 1 August 1920) was an Irish nationalist politician and member of parliament (MP) in the House of Commons of the United Kingdom of Great Britain and Ireland.

He was elected unopposed as an Irish National Federation (Anti-Parnellite) MP for the South Kilkenny constituency at the 1894 by-election, following the resignation of the incumbent MP Patrick Chance.

He was re-elected unopposed at the 1895 general election, but did not contest the 1900 general election.

Parliament of the United Kingdom
Preceded by Patrick Chance	Member of Parliament for South Kilkenny; 1894 – 1900	Succeeded by James O'Mara
