= Matthew Keating (politician) =

Irish politician

Matthew Keating (23 May 1869 – 25 May 1937) was an Irish politician. He was born at Mountain Ash, South Wales, the second son of Cornelius Keating, a native of Cahirciveen, County Kerry. He was educated at the local Catholic Elementary School and became a miner at Nixon's Navigation Colliery. He later entered into business at Cardiff, and at Newport. He relocated to London in 1898.

Keating was elected unopposed as Irish Nationalist Member of Parliament for South Kilkenny in a 1909 by-election, after the previous holder, Nicholas Joseph Murphy, was declared bankrupt. Keating held the seat until the 1918 general election, when he was defeated by the Sinn Féin candidate and former MP for South Kilkenny, James O'Mara by 8,685 votes to 1,855.

After his time in Parliament, Keating took a keen interest in literary affairs. He eventually was made Fellow of the Royal Statistical Society. He served also as a director of Irish Shell Ltd.

In 1913 Keating married Hannah Sweeney, of Gore, New Zealand, whose family were from County Donegal. He died at his home at Cricklewood, London.

Parliament of the United Kingdom
Preceded by Nicholas Joseph Murphy	Member of Parliament for South Kilkenny; 1909–1918	Succeeded by James O'Mara
