= 1924 Cork East by-election =

By-election to the 4th Dáil

- 18 November 1924
- Turnout: 30,116 (56.0%)
	Noonan	Walsh
Nominee	Michael K. Noonan	Michael Walsh
Party	Cumann na nGaedheal	Republican
First preferences	17,717	12,399
Percentage	58.8%	41.2%
TD before election
Thomas O'Mahony
Cumann na nGaedheal
TD after election
Michael K. Noonan
Cumann na nGaedheal

A Dáil by-election was held in the constituency of Cork East in the Irish Free State on Tuesday, 18 November 1924, to fill a vacancy in the 4th Dáil. Cork East was a five seat constituency which included the county electoral areas of Mallow and Cobh.

Thomas O'Mahony, Teachta Dála (TD) for Cumann na nGaedheal, died on 20 July 1924. The writ of election to fill the vacancy was agreed by the Dáil on 28 October 1924. It was one of five by-elections agreed that day.

== Result ==
The by-election was held on 18 November 1924. It was held on the same day as the November 1924 Dublin South by-election and the 1924 Mayo North by-election. The by-election was won by the Cumann na nGaedheal candidate, Michael K. Noonan.

1924 Cork East by-election
Party	Candidate	FPv%	Count
Party	Candidate	FPv%	1
Cumann na nGaedheal	Michael K. Noonan	58.8	17,717
Republican	Michael Walsh	41.2	12,399
Electorate: 53,752 Valid: 30,116 Quota: 15,059 Turnout: 56.0%

Noonan took his seat in Dáil Éireann on 2 December, after taking the Oath of Allegiance required under Article 17 of the Constitution of the Irish Free State. Noonan lost his seat at the June 1927 general election and did not stand for election again.
