= Jean Fayard =

French writer

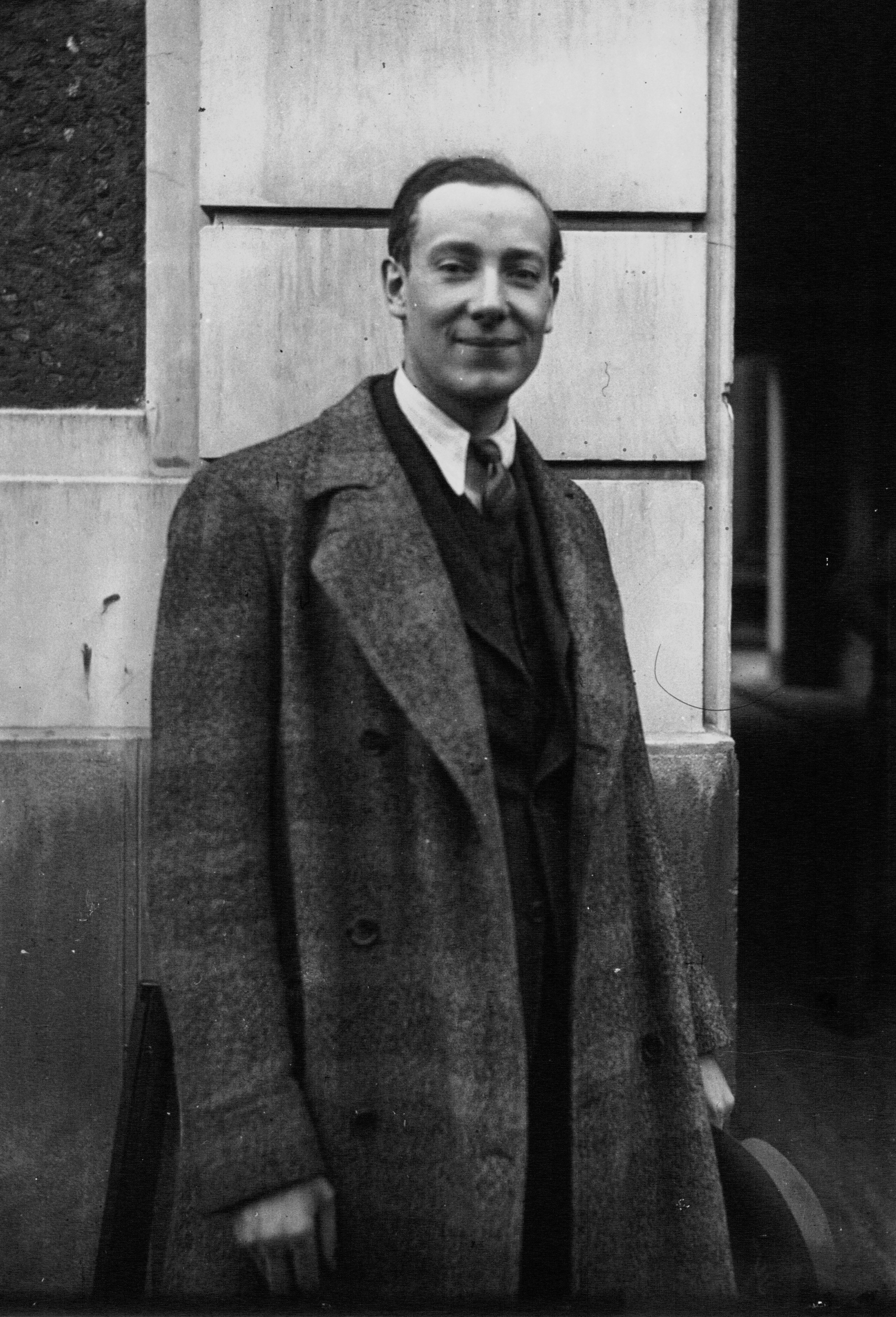
- Born: 1902; Paris, France
- Died: 1978 (aged 75–76); Paris, France
- Occupation: Journalist
- Writing career
- Language: French

Jean Fayard (24 January 1902 in Paris – 26 September 1978) was a French writer and journalist, winner of the Prix Goncourt in 1931.

Fayard was also director of the Editions Fayard. Jean Fayard was the grandson of the founder of Fayard. At the death of his father, Joseph Artheme Fayard, 1936, he took the helm of the publishing family. His papers are held at Institut Mémoires de l'édition contemporaine, 25, rue de Lille, 7th arrondissement of Paris.

== Work ==
- Deux ans à Oxford? Impr. F. Paillart, 1924
- Dans le monde où l'on s'abuse, Arthème Fayard, 1925
- Journal d'un colonel, Éditions de la nouvelle revue française, 1925
- Trois quarts de monde: roman, Artheme Fayard, 1926
- Oxford et Margaret, A. Fayard, 1928
- Madeleine et Madeleine, Gallimard, 1928
- Bruxelles, Émile-Paul frères, 1928
- Mal d'amour, Éditions de l'imprimerie nationale, 1931
- Liebesleid: Roman, R. Piper, 1933
- La féérie de la rue: roman, Henri Duvernois, Jean Fayard, B. Grasset, 1937
- Mes Maitresses, A. Fayard, 1941
- Roman, A. Fayard, 1945
- L'Allemagne sous le Croix de Lorraine, "Les Oeuvres Libras", 1945
- La guerre intérieure, Stock, 1974, ISBN 978-2-234-00108-4
- Je m'éloigne: roman, Plon, 1977, ISBN 978-2-259-00236-3

=== English Translations ===
- Oxford & Margaret: Translated from the French by Louis Golding, Jarrolds, 1925
- Desire, Translated by Warre Bradley Wells, The Century Co., 1932
