= Seamus Clandillon =

Irish musician and radio executive (1878–1944)

- Born: 6 June 1878 near Gort, County Galway
- Died: 21 April 1944 (aged 65); Dublin
- Known for: first director of radio broadcasting at 2RN

Seamus Clandillon (6 June 1878 – 21 April 1944) was an Irish musician, civil servant, and first director of radio broadcasting at 2RN.

== Early life and education ==
Seamus Clandillon was born near Gort, County Galway on 6 June 1878. His father was a national school teacher, William A. Clandillon, from Athy, County Kildare. His mother was Joanna Little, whose family moved from Lancashire to Coole Park near Gort when her father was employed as a gardener there. He attended St Flannan's College, Ennis, and entered University College Dublin (UCD) in 1897. He developed a love for the Irish language while in UCD, becoming a member of the UCD branch of the Gaelic League, and taught introductory Irish language classes with Patrick Pearse from 1900 to 1901. He was interested in music since childhood, and collected a number of songs from around Gort. In UCD, he was part of a choir. Among his friends from UCD were Francis Sheehy-Skeffington, Francis Cruise O'Brien, and George Clancy. He was also among the UCD students who signed a letter of protest that was published in the Freeman's Journal on 10 May 1899, which objected to the portrayal of the Irish as "a loathsome brood of apostates" in W. B. Yeats' The Countess Cathleen. Clandillon studied at the College of Art, and won distinction as an illuminator and sketcher. In 1911 he graduated with a BA, and was awarded a scholarship to study in Paris. While abroad, he became fluent in French, Italian, and Spanish.

He married Máighréad Ní Annagáin on 19 January 1904. They had three sons and two daughters.

== Career ==
In the 1901 Census of Ireland Clandillon is a teacher in St Flannan's. From 1903 to 1905, Clandillon taught at the Clonmel technical school, County Tipperary, before moving to the Clonakilty agricultural college, County Cork teaching there until 1912. He joined the national health insurance office in 1912 as a divisional inspector, and in 1922 was he was transferred to the Department of Defence where he oversaw the dependants’ claim section. During his career as a civil servant, Clandillon continued to sing and play the piano. In 1904, he published a song book with his wife, An londubh: dhá amhrán déag. He was a popular singer and pianist in Great Britain and Ireland, and performed at numerous cultural events. He won the gold medal for singing at the 1911 Oireachtas.

Due to his knowledge and experience with traditional Irish music, he was appointed the first director of broadcasting with 2RN in 1925. He was trained at the BBC in London, and persuaded Douglas Hyde to give the opening address at the launch of the station on 1 January 1926. He ran the station for the next 8 years, in the face of severe staff and budgetary constraints, and while receiving criticism from journalists and politicians. Due to these difficulties, he requested a transfer in September 1926, but was persuaded to remain in the position. In 1926, 2RN was the first radio station in Europe to broadcast the live commentary on a field game, the 1926 All-Ireland hurling semi-final between Kilkenny and Galway.

Clandillon published another volume with his wife, "Londubh an chairn": songs of Irish Gaels in 1927. It was described as "a grave injury ... to Ireland's reputation in the field of folk music" by Donal O'Sullivan in the Irish Statesman (19 November 1927). His comments led Clandillon and Ní Annagáin to bring a libel action against O'Sullivan, George W. Russell, and the Irish Statesman Publishing Co. It was the longest libel action in the history of the Irish courts at the time, running from 29 October to 14 November 1928. The jury could not reach a decision, and the costs were shared. It was rumoured that Clandillon lost his savings as a result.

In 1932, Clandillon led the broadcast coverage of the eucharistic congress in Dublin, part of which was relayed by the BBC. This broadcast was the first time the Irish people heard the pope's voice. In 1927, he refused to allow John Logie Baird to give a radio talk about television, claiming that the invention was "unworkable". The Fianna Fáil government decided that he should be replaced in February 1934, and in May 1935, T. J. Kiernan took over the post. Clandillon served longer in the post that most of his successors, working until his health failed in November 1934. In January 1935, he was reappointed to the Department of Local Government and Public Health, later moving to Galway where he worked in the civil service until 1943.

Clandillon died on 21 April 1944 in a Dublin nursing home.
