= March 1924 Dublin South by-election =

By-election to the 4th Dáil

- 12 March 1924
- Turnout: 32,451 (42.2%)
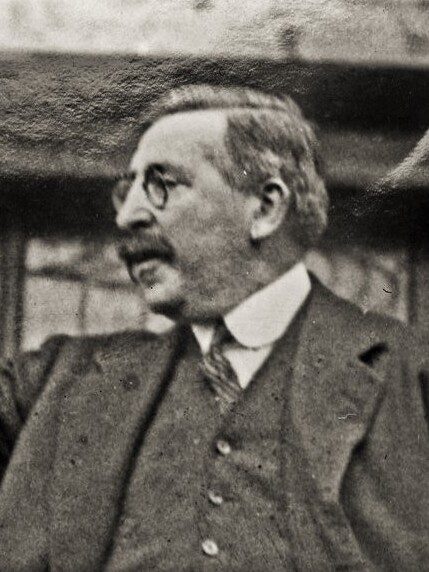

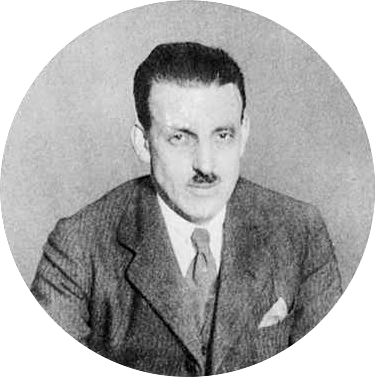
			O'Neill
Nominee	James O'Mara	Seán Lemass	John O'Neill
Party	Cumann na nGaedheal	Republican	Independent
First preferences	15,884	13,639	2,928
Percentage	48.9%	32.7%	9.0%
TD before election
Philip Cosgrave
Cumann na nGaedheal
TD after election
James O'Mara
Cumann na nGaedheal

A Dáil by-election was held in the constituency of Dublin South in the Irish Free State on Wednesday, 12 March 1924, to fill a vacancy in the 4th Dáil.

Philip Cosgrave, Teachta Dála (TD) for Cumann na nGaedheal and brother of W. T. Cosgrave, died on 22 October 1923.

A government motion to issue the writ of election to fill the vacancy was agreed on 20 February 1924.

Dublin South was a seven seat constituency which included the borough electoral areas of Dublin 3, 5, 7, 9, and 10, being the wards of Fitzwilliam, Mansion House, Royal Exchange, South City, Merchant's Quay, New Kilmainham, Usher's Quay, Wood Quay, South Dock and Trinity.

The Cumann na nGaedheal candidate, James O'Mara, had been an MP for South Kilkenny from 1900 to 1907. He represented South Kilkenny again in the First Dáil, from 1918 to 1921. The Republican candidate, Seán Lemass, was a veteran of the Irish Republican Army during the War of Independence and of the Anti-Treaty forces during the Civil War.

== Result ==
The by-election was held on 12 March 1924. The seat was won by James O'Mara.

March 1924 Dublin South by-election
Party	Candidate	FPv%	Count	
Party	Candidate	FPv%	1	2
Cumann na nGaedheal	James O'Mara	49.0	15,884	17,193
Republican	Seán Lemass	42.0	13,639	13,942
Independent	John O'Neill	9.0	2,928	
Electorate: 76,882 Valid: 32,451 Quota: 16,226 Turnout: 42.2%

O'Mara took his seat in Dáil Éireann on 26 March, after taking the Oath of Allegiance required under Article 17 of the Constitution of the Irish Free State.

The runner-up, Seán Lemass, was elected at the November 1924 Dublin South by-election.
