= James O'Mara =

Irish politician (1873–1948)

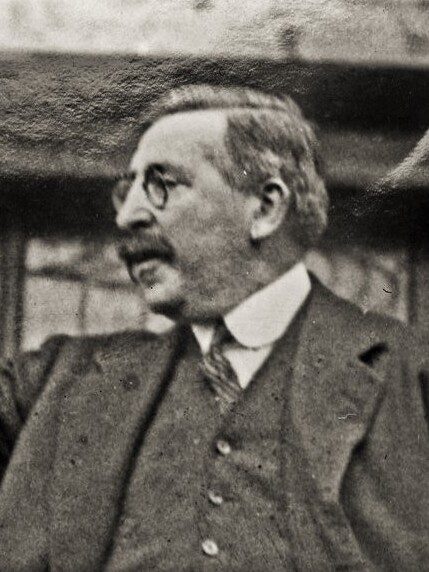
- O'Mara in 1924

Teachta Dála
- In office March 1924 – June 1927
- Constituency: Dublin South
- In office December 1918 – May 1921
- Constituency: South Kilkenny

Member of Parliament
- In office October 1900 – July 1907
- Constituency: South Kilkenny

Personal details
- Born: 6 August 1873 Limerick, Ireland
- Died: 21 November 1948 (aged 75) Dublin, Ireland
- Party: Sinn Féin
- Spouse: Agnes Cashel (m. 1895)
- Children: 7
- Parent: Stephen O'Mara (father)
- Relatives: Stephen M. O'Mara (brother); Phons O'Mara (brother); Ellen Sullivan (sister)
- Education: Royal University of Ireland

British Army intelligence file for James O'Mara

James O'Mara (6 August 1873 – 21 November 1948) was an Irish businessman and politician who became a nationalist leader and key member of the revolutionary First Dáil. As an MP in the House of Commons of the United Kingdom, he introduced the bill which made Saint Patrick's Day a national holiday in Ireland in 1903. He was one of the few politicians to have served both as member in the House of Commons and in Dáil Éireann.

== Early life ==
O'Mara was born in Limerick, son of Stephen O'Mara and Ellen Pigott, and educated by the Christian Brothers in Limerick, and at Clongowes Wood College. His studies at the Royal University of Ireland were postponed after the death of his Uncle Jim in 1893, when James was sent to London to take over his Uncle's business functions. After his marriage in 1895 to Agnes Cashel, sister of the republican activist in later life Alice Cashel, he moved to Epsom in Surrey, and then to Sydenham in London. He finally got his bachelor's degree from the Royal University in 1898.

== Political career ==
In the 1900 general election, O'Mara was elected unopposed for the Irish Parliamentary Party as MP for South Kilkenny.

His career in House of Commons is noted for his introduction of Bank Holiday (Ireland) Act 1903, making Saint Patrick's Day a national holiday. O'Mara later introduced the law which required that pubs be closed on 17 March, a provision which was repealed in the 1970s.

In 1907, O'Mara resigned from Parliament and from the Irish Parliamentary Party and later joined Sinn Féin, the first MP to do so. He returned to Dublin in 1914 to continue his work in the bacon business, and remained active in Sinn Féin.

== Dáil Éireann ==
At the 1918 general election, he was Sinn Féin's Director of Finance and the party's fourth Director of Elections (his three predecessors having been imprisoned). He was elected as a Sinn Féin MP for his old constituency of South Kilkenny, defeating the Irish Party's Matthew Keating by 8,685 votes to 1,855. Kilkenny South was one of 73 constituencies returning Sinn Féin MPs pledged not to take their seats at Westminster. In the First Dáil, he became Trustee of Dáil Éireann funds, and travelled to the United States with Éamon de Valera to pursue a fund-raising drive. He resigned his trusteeship after a disagreement with de Valera and he stood down from the Dáil at the 1921 election.

A supporter of the 1921 Anglo-Irish Treaty, he was appointed as the first Irish Ambassador to the United States, but served only briefly.

After the death in 1923 of Philip Cosgrave, the Cumann na nGaedheal TD for Dublin South and brother of W. T. Cosgrave, O'Mara stood as the Cumann na nGaedheal candidate in the resulting by-election. Polling took place on 12 March 1924, and O'Mara was returned to the 4th Dáil, which sat until 1927. He did not contest the June 1927 general election, and retired from politics.

He died on 21 November 1948 and is buried in Glasnevin Cemetery, Dublin. His wife Agnes died on 2 June 1958.

== Sources ==
- (Limerick Leader, Saturday, 12 December 1998)
- James O'Mara family tree
- Walker, Brian M., ed. (1978). Parliamentary Election Results in Ireland, 1801–1922. Dublin: Royal Irish Academy. ISBN 0901714127.

Parliament of the United Kingdom
| Preceded by Samuel Morris | Member of Parliament for South Kilkenny; 1900–1907 | Succeeded by Nicholas Joseph Murphy |
| Preceded by Matthew Keating | Member of Parliament for South Kilkenny; 1918–1922 | Constituency abolished |
Oireachtas
| New constituency | Teachta Dála for South Kilkenny; 1918–1921 | Constituency abolished |

| Dáil | Election | Deputy (Party) | Deputy (Party) | Deputy (Party) | Deputy (Party) | Deputy (Party) | Deputy (Party) | Deputy (Party) |
|---|---|---|---|---|---|---|---|---|
| 2nd | 1921 | Thomas Kelly (SF) | Daniel McCarthy (SF) | Constance Markievicz (SF) | Cathal Ó Murchadha (SF) | 4 seats 1921–1923 | | |
| 3rd | 1922 | Thomas Kelly (PT-SF) | Daniel McCarthy (PT-SF) | William O'Brien (Lab) | Myles Keogh (Ind.) | 4 seats 1921–1923 | | |
| 4th | 1923 | Philip Cosgrave (CnaG) | Daniel McCarthy (CnaG) | Constance Markievicz (Rep) | Myles Keogh (Ind.) | Cathal Ó Murchadha (Rep) | Michael Hayes (CnaG) | Peadar Doyle (CnaG) |
| 4th | 1923 by-election | Philip Cosgrave (CnaG) | Daniel McCarthy (CnaG) | Constance Markievicz (Rep) | Myles Keogh (Ind.) | Cathal Ó Murchadha (Rep) | Hugh Kennedy (CnaG) | Peadar Doyle (CnaG) |
| 4th | March 1924 by-election | James O'Mara (CnaG) | Daniel McCarthy (CnaG) | Constance Markievicz (Rep) | Myles Keogh (Ind.) | Cathal Ó Murchadha (Rep) | Hugh Kennedy (CnaG) | Peadar Doyle (CnaG) |
| 4th | November 1924 by-election | James O'Mara (CnaG) | Daniel McCarthy (CnaG) | Constance Markievicz (Rep) | Myles Keogh (Ind.) | Cathal Ó Murchadha (Rep) | Seán Lemass (SF) | Peadar Doyle (CnaG) |
| 4th | 1925 by-election | James O'Mara (CnaG) | Thomas Hennessy (CnaG) | Constance Markievicz (Rep) | Myles Keogh (Ind.) | Cathal Ó Murchadha (Rep) | Seán Lemass (SF) | Peadar Doyle (CnaG) |
| 5th | 1927 (Jun) | James Beckett (CnaG) | Vincent Rice (NL) | Constance Markievicz (FF) | Myles Keogh (Ind.) | Thomas Lawlor (Lab) | Seán Lemass (FF) | Peadar Doyle (CnaG) |
| 5th | 1927 by-election | James Beckett (CnaG) | Vincent Rice (NL) | Thomas Hennessy (CnaG) | Myles Keogh (Ind.) | Thomas Lawlor (Lab) | Seán Lemass (FF) | Peadar Doyle (CnaG) |
| 6th | 1927 (Sep) | James Beckett (CnaG) | Robert Briscoe (FF) | Thomas Hennessy (CnaG) | Myles Keogh (CnaG) | Frank Kerlin (FF) | Seán Lemass (FF) | Peadar Doyle (CnaG) |
| 7th | 1932 | James Beckett (CnaG) | Robert Briscoe (FF) | Thomas Hennessy (CnaG) | Myles Keogh (CnaG) | James Lynch (FF) | Seán Lemass (FF) | Peadar Doyle (CnaG) |
| 8th | 1933 | James Beckett (CnaG) | Robert Briscoe (FF) | James McGuire (CnaG) | Thomas Kelly (FF) | James Lynch (FF) | Seán Lemass (FF) | Peadar Doyle (CnaG) |
| 9th | 1937 | Myles Keogh (FG) | Robert Briscoe (FF) | Thomas Lawlor (Lab) | Thomas Kelly (FF) | Joseph Hannigan (Ind.) | Seán Lemass (FF) | Peadar Doyle (FG) |
| 10th | 1938 | James Beckett (FG) | Robert Briscoe (FF) | James Lynch (FF) | Thomas Kelly (FF) | Joseph Hannigan (Ind.) | Seán Lemass (FF) | Peadar Doyle (FG) |
| 10th | 1939 by-election | John McCann (FF) | Robert Briscoe (FF) | James Lynch (FF) | Thomas Kelly (FF) | Joseph Hannigan (Ind.) | Seán Lemass (FF) | Peadar Doyle (FG) |
| 11th | 1943 | Maurice Dockrell (FG) | Robert Briscoe (FF) | James Lynch (FF) | James Larkin Jnr (Lab) | John McCann (FF) | Seán Lemass (FF) | Peadar Doyle (FG) |
| 12th | 1944 | Maurice Dockrell (FG) | Robert Briscoe (FF) | James Lynch (FF) | James Larkin Jnr (Lab) | John McCann (FF) | Seán Lemass (FF) | Peadar Doyle (FG) |
| 13th | 1948 | Constituency abolished. See Dublin South-Central, Dublin South-East and Dublin South-West. | | | | | | |

| Dáil | Election | Deputy (Party) | Deputy (Party) | Deputy (Party) | Deputy (Party) | Deputy (Party) |
|---|---|---|---|---|---|---|
| 22nd | 1981 | Niall Andrews (FF) | Séamus Brennan (FF) | Nuala Fennell (FG) | John Kelly (FG) | Alan Shatter (FG) |
| 23rd | 1982 (Feb) | Niall Andrews (FF) | Séamus Brennan (FF) | Nuala Fennell (FG) | John Kelly (FG) | Alan Shatter (FG) |
| 24th | 1982 (Nov) | Niall Andrews (FF) | Séamus Brennan (FF) | Nuala Fennell (FG) | John Kelly (FG) | Alan Shatter (FG) |
| 25th | 1987 | Tom Kitt (FF) | Séamus Brennan (FF) | Anne Colley (PDs) | John Kelly (FG) | Alan Shatter (FG) |
| 26th | 1989 | Tom Kitt (FF) | Séamus Brennan (FF) | Nuala Fennell (FG) | Roger Garland (GP) | Alan Shatter (FG) |
| 27th | 1992 | Tom Kitt (FF) | Séamus Brennan (FF) | Liz O'Donnell (PDs) | Eithne FitzGerald (Lab) | Alan Shatter (FG) |
| 28th | 1997 | Tom Kitt (FF) | Séamus Brennan (FF) | Liz O'Donnell (PDs) | Olivia Mitchell (FG) | Alan Shatter (FG) |
| 29th | 2002 | Tom Kitt (FF) | Séamus Brennan (FF) | Liz O'Donnell (PDs) | Olivia Mitchell (FG) | Eamon Ryan (GP) |
| 30th | 2007 | Tom Kitt (FF) | Séamus Brennan (FF) | Alan Shatter (FG) | Olivia Mitchell (FG) | Eamon Ryan (GP) |
| 30th | 2009 by-election | Tom Kitt (FF) | George Lee (FG) | Alan Shatter (FG) | Olivia Mitchell (FG) | Eamon Ryan (GP) |
| 31st | 2011 | Shane Ross (Ind.) | Peter Mathews (FG) | Alan Shatter (FG) | Olivia Mitchell (FG) | Alex White (Lab) |
| 32nd | 2016 | Constituency abolished. See Dublin Rathdown, Dublin South-West and Dún Laoghaire. | | | | |
