= Warre B. Wells =

Warre Bradley Wells (13 May 1892 – 16 July 1958) was an Irish writer, journalist, translator and newspaper editor. From 1919 to 1921 he edited the Irish Statesman, which promoted the views of the Irish Dominion League. A member of the Church of Ireland, he also edited The Church of Ireland Gazette from 1906 to 1918, and served as wartime correspondent for the paper, writing The War this Week weekly column. He wrote a biography of the Irish politician John Redmond.

Born in Dublin, Ireland, the son of a retired naval officer, he worked for the Liverpool Daily Post and Liverpool Echo in England, where his family were from. For some time he served as assistant editor and leader writer of The Irish Times from 1911 to 1918.

== Publications ==
- The Life of John Redmond (1919)
- An Irish Apologia; Some Thoughts on Anglo-Irish Relations and the War (1917)
- A History of the Irish Rebellion (of 1916) (1916)
- Viper's Tangle by François Mauriac, (1933) (Translator)
- Desire, by Jean Fayard, The Century Co. (1932) (Translator)
- Tides of Mont St.-Michel, by Roger Vercel (1938) (Translator)
