= South Kilkenny =

UK constituency in Ireland, 1885 to 1922

- Former county constituency for the House of Commons

1885–1922
- Seats: 1
- Created from: County Kilkenny
- Replaced by: Carlow–Kilkenny

South Kilkenny was a UK Parliament constituency in Ireland.

== Boundaries ==
This county constituency comprised the southern part of County Kilkenny. From 1885 to 1922 it returned one Member of Parliament. It was redrawn in 1918, taking into account the abolition of Kilkenny City as a parliamentary borough, the transfer of part of the town of New Ross to County Wexford, and the transfer of the Kilculliheen area to County Kilkenny from Waterford city following the Local Government (Ireland) Act 1898.

1885–1918: The baronies of Callan, Ida, Iverk and Knocktopher, and that part of the barony of Gowran contained within the parishes of Ballylinch, Columbkille, Famma, Graiguenamanagh, Inistioge, Jerpoint Abbey, Jerpoint West, Kilfane, Pleberstown, Thomastown and Ullard.

1918–1922: The rural districts of Callan, Carrick-on-Suir No. 3, Ida, Thomastown and Waterford No. 2.

Before the 1885 United Kingdom general election the area was part of the County Kilkenny constituency. The constituency ceased to be entitled to be represented in the UK House of Commons on the dissolution of 26 October 1922, shortly before the Irish Free State came into legal existence on 6 December 1922.

== First Dáil ==
The constituency was, in Irish republican theory, entitled to return one Teachta Dála (known in English as a Deputy) in 1918 to serve in the Irish Republic's First Dáil. Sinn Féin used the 1918 general election to elect the Dáil. The revolutionary body assembled on 21 January 1919. The list of members read out on that day included everyone elected in Ireland. Only the Sinn Féin Deputies participated in the Dáil, but the other Irish MPs could have done so if they had chosen to adhere to the Republic.

The First Dáil, passed a motion at its last meeting on 10 May 1921, the first three parts of which make explicit the republican view.

1. That the Parliamentary elections which are to take place during the present month be regarded as elections to Dáil Éireann.
2. That all deputies duly returned at these elections be regarded as members of Dáil Éireann and allowed to take their seats on subscribing to the proposed Oath of Allegiance.
3. That the present Dáil dissolve automatically as soon as the new body has been summoned by the President and called to order.

The Second Dáil first met on 16 August 1921, thereby dissolving the First Dáil.

Sinn Féin had decided to use the polls for the Northern Ireland House of Commons and the House of Commons of Southern Ireland as an election for the Irish Republic's Second Dáil. No actual voting was necessary in Southern Ireland as all the seats were filled by unopposed returns. Except for Dublin University all other constituencies elected Sinn Féin TDs. As with the First Dáil, the other deputies could have joined the Dáil if they chose.

From the 3rd Dáil onwards the Dáil represented only the twenty-six counties which formed the Irish Free State.

In the 2nd and 3rd Dála Kilkenny South formed part of the Carlow–Kilkenny constituency.

== Politics ==
Sinn Féin defeated the Irish Parliamentary Party by better than 4 to 1 in the 1918 election. James O'Mara had been Nationalist MP for the constituency from 1900 to 1907. He had resigned the seat when he joined Sinn Féin.

== Members of Parliament ==
| Election | Member | Party | Note |
|---|---|---|---|
| 1885, December 4 | Patrick Chance | Irish Parliamentary | Party split |
| 1890, December ^{1} | Patrick Chance | Anti-Parnellite | Joined new organisation |
| 1891, March ^{1} | Patrick Chance | Irish National Federation | Resigned |
| 1894, September 7 | Samuel Morris | Irish National Federation | |
| 1900, October 6 | James O'Mara | Irish Parliamentary | Resigned |
| 1907, July 29 | Nicholas Joseph Murphy | Irish Parliamentary | Declared bankrupt |
| 1909, August 10 | Matthew Keating | Irish Parliamentary | |
| 1918, December 14 ^{2} | James O'Mara | Sinn Féin | Did not take his seat at Westminster |
| 1922, October 26 | UK constituency abolished | | |

Notes:-

- ^{1} Not an election, but the date of a party change. The Irish Parliamentary Party had been created in 1882, on the initiative of Charles Stewart Parnell's Irish National League. Both the IPP and the INL split into Parnellite and Anti-Parnellite factions, in December 1890. The Parnellites remained members of the Irish National League after the split and the Anti-Parnellites organised the Irish National Federation in March 1891. The two organisations and the United Irish League merged in 1900, to re-create the Irish Parliamentary Party.
- ^{2} Date of polling day. The result was declared on 28 December 1918, to allow time for votes cast by members of the armed forces to be included in the count.

== Elections ==
=== Elections in the 1880s ===
1885 general election: South Kilkenny
| Party | Candidate | Votes | % | ±% |
|---|---|---|---|---|
| Irish Parliamentary | Patrick Chance | 4,088 | 94.8 | |
| Irish Conservative | Raymond de la Poer | 222 | 5.2 | |
| Majority | | 3,866 | 89.6 | |
| Turnout | | 4,310 | 72.8 | |
| Registered electors | | 5,924 | | |
| Irish Parliamentary win (new seat) | | | | |

1886 general election: South Kilkenny
| Party | Candidate | Votes | % | ±% |
|---|---|---|---|---|
| Irish Parliamentary | Patrick Chance | Unopposed | | |
| Irish Parliamentary hold | | | | |

=== Elections in the 1890s ===
1892 general election: South Kilkenny
| Party | Candidate | Votes | % | ±% |
|---|---|---|---|---|
| Irish National Federation | Patrick Chance | 3,346 | 93.0 | N/A |
| Irish Unionist | Raymond de la Poer | 253 | 7.0 | New |
| Majority | | 3,093 | 86.0 | N/A |
| Turnout | | 3,599 | 56.4 | N/A |
| Registered electors | | 6,385 | | |
| Irish National Federation gain from Irish Parliamentary | | Swing | N/A | |

By-election, 1894: South Kilkenny
| Party | Candidate | Votes | % | ±% |
|---|---|---|---|---|
| Irish National Federation | Samuel Morris | Unopposed | | |
| Irish National Federation hold | | | | |

1895 general election: South Kilkenny
| Party | Candidate | Votes | % | ±% |
|---|---|---|---|---|
| Irish National Federation | Samuel Morris | Unopposed | | |
| Irish National Federation hold | | | | |

=== Elections in the 1900s ===
1900 general election: Kilkenny South
| Party | Candidate | Votes | % | ±% |
|---|---|---|---|---|
| Irish Parliamentary | James O'Mara | Unopposed | | |
| Irish Parliamentary hold | | | | |

1906 general election: Kilkenny South
| Party | Candidate | Votes | % | ±% |
|---|---|---|---|---|
| Irish Parliamentary | James O'Mara | Unopposed | | |
| Irish Parliamentary hold | | | | |

By-election, 1907: Kilkenny South
| Party | Candidate | Votes | % | ±% |
|---|---|---|---|---|
| Irish Parliamentary | Nicholas Joseph Murphy | Unopposed | | |
| Irish Parliamentary hold | | | | |

Murphy is declared bankrupt, prompting a by-election.

By-election, 1909: Kilkenny South
| Party | Candidate | Votes | % | ±% |
|---|---|---|---|---|
| Irish Parliamentary | Matthew Keating | Unopposed | | |
| Irish Parliamentary hold | | | | |

=== Elections in the 1910s ===
January 1910 general election: Kilkenny South
| Party | Candidate | Votes | % | ±% |
|---|---|---|---|---|
| Irish Parliamentary | Matthew Keating | Unopposed | | |
| Irish Parliamentary hold | | | | |

December 1910 general election: Kilkenny South
| Party | Candidate | Votes | % | ±% |
|---|---|---|---|---|
| Irish Parliamentary | Matthew Keating | 2,265 | 88.8 | N/A |
| Ind. Nationalist | Nicholas Joseph Murphy | 287 | 11.2 | New |
| Majority | | 1,978 | 77.6 | N/A |
| Turnout | | 2,552 | 51.5 | N/A |
| Registered electors | | 4,958 | | |
| Irish Parliamentary hold | | Swing | N/A | |

1918 general election: Kilkenny South
| Party | Candidate | Votes | % | ±% |
|---|---|---|---|---|
| Sinn Féin | James O'Mara | 8,685 | 82.4 | New |
| Irish Parliamentary | Matthew Keating | 1,855 | 17.6 | −71.2 |
| Majority | | 6,830 | 64.8 | N/A |
| Turnout | | 10,540 | 64.2 | +12.7 |
| Registered electors | | 16,410 | | |
| Sinn Féin gain from Irish Parliamentary | | Swing | | |
