= November 1924 Dublin South by-election =

By-election to the 4th Dáil

- 18 November 1924
- Turnout: 33,637 (42.8%)
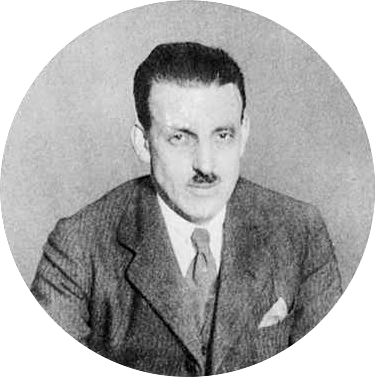

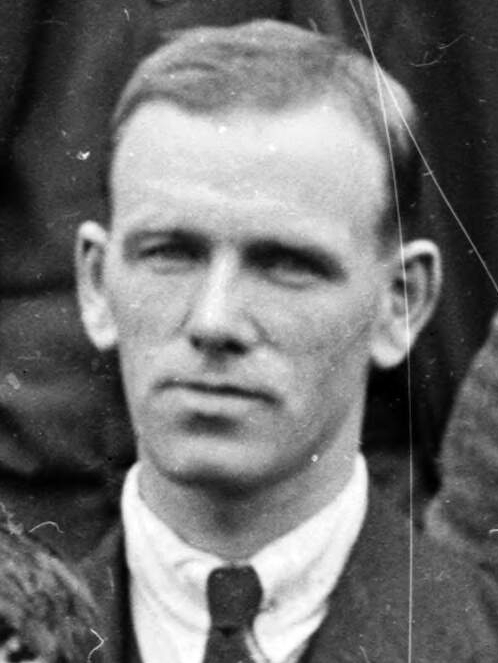
Nominee	Seán Lemass	Seamus Hughes
Party	Republican	Cumann na nGaedheal
First preferences	17,297	16,340
Percentage	51.4%	48.6%
TD before election
Hugh Kennedy
Cumann na nGaedheal
TD after election
Seán Lemass
Republican

A Dáil by-election was held in the constituency of Dublin South in the Irish Free State on Tuesday, 18 November 1924, to fill a vacancy in the 4th Dáil. Dublin South was a seven seat constituency which included the borough electoral areas of Dublin 3, 5, 7, 9, and 10, being the wards of Fitzwilliam, Mansion House, Royal Exchange, South City, Merchant's Quay, New Kilmainham, Usher's Quay, Wood Quay, South Dock and Trinity.

The Attorney General, Hugh Kennedy, who had been elected as a Teachta Dála (TD) for Cumann na nGaedheal at the 1923 Dublin South by-election, resigned on 5 June 1924 to take office as the first Chief Justice of Ireland. The writ of election to fill the vacancy was agreed by the Dáil on 28 October 1924. It was one of five by-elections agreed that day.

The Cumann na nGaedheal candidate, Seamus Hughes, was the first general secretary of the party. The Republican candidate, Seán Lemass, was a veteran of the Irish Republican Army during the War of Independence and of the Anti-Treaty forces during the Civil War. He had been the runner-up in the March 1924 Dublin South by-election.

== Result ==
The by-election was held on 18 November 1924. It was held on the same day as 1924 Cork East by-election and the 1924 Mayo North by-election. Five arrests were made for attempted personation. The seat was won by Seán Lemass. The results in Dublin South and in Mayo North were the first defeats for Cumann na nGaedheal in Dáil by-elections. The 1924 Cork Borough by-election and the 1924 Donegal by-election were held later that week; Cumann na nGaedheal held both seats.

November 1924 Dublin South by-election
Party	Candidate	FPv%	Count
Party	Candidate	FPv%	1
Republican	Seán Lemass	51.4	17,297
Cumann na nGaedheal	Seamus Hughes	48.6	16,340
Electorate: 78,682 Valid: 33,637 Quota: 16,819 Turnout: 42.8%

Lemass did not take his seat in the 4th Dáil. He was re-elected at the June 1927 general election to the 5th Dáil for Fianna Fáil, taking his seat when the party dropped its policy of abstentionism in August 1927. Lemass later served as a TD until 1969 and in several government positions, culminating as Taoiseach from 1959 to 1966.
