= 2RN =

First radio station in the Irish Free State

2RN was the first radio broadcasting station in the Irish Free State. It began broadcasting on 1 January 1926 and continued until 1933, when it was succeeded by Radio Athlone (later Radio Éireann; now known as RTÉ Radio). The station was run by the Irish Post Office, under the Department of Posts and Telegraphs and first transmitted from 1 January 1926 from Little Denmark Street until 1928 when they moved to the GPO. Early broadcasters included Seamus Hughes and Sidney Gifford Czira.

The station's name has since been repurposed by RTÉ (Raidió Teilifís Éireann) for the identity of their broadcasting network (formerly RTÉ Transmission Network Ltd) since 2013.

== Studios and wavelengths ==
The original studio for 2RN was located at Little Denmark Street, off Henry Street in Dublin. In October 1928 the station moved into the newly rebuilt GPO acquiring three new studios. The first director was Seamus Clandillon, who served from 1926 to 1934.

The 1.5 Kilowatt Marconi transmitter was located at McKee Barracks, near the Phoenix Park.

The station initially broadcast on 380 metres (790 kHz), although the choice of this wavelength led to complaints from members of the public as, due to the limitations of the receiver technology of the time, transmissions led to interference to and by other stations, especially 6BM in Bournemouth and the Hamburg radio station.

Reception of the station for many Irish listeners outside Dublin was problematic, although even at the time of the inception of the station, there were plans for a high-power transmitter to serve the whole country. In 1927 the Cork broadcasting station 6CK was established, which relayed many of 2RN's programmes, as well as contributing programmes to the network.

Initially the station broadcast three hours a night, from 19:30 to 22:30, with only a two-hour broadcast on Sunday nights.

== See also ==
- Radio in Ireland
- RTÉ
