= John O'Byrne =

Judge of the Supreme Court
- In office 17 May 1940 – 2 July 1954
- Nominated by: Government of Ireland
- Appointed by: Douglas Hyde

Judge of the High Court
- In office 10 January 1926 – 16 May 1940
- Nominated by: Government of Ireland
- Appointed by: Tim Healy

Attorney General of Ireland
- In office 7 June 1924 – 9 January 1926
- Taoiseach: W. T. Cosgrave
- Preceded by: Hugh Kennedy
- Succeeded by: John A. Costello

Personal details
- Born: 24 May 1884 Carlow, Ireland
- Died: 14 January 1954 (aged 69) Killiney, Dublin, Ireland
- Party: Fine Gael
- Spouse: Marjorie McGuire (m. 1924)
- Children: 4
- Education: Royal University of Ireland; King's Inns

John O'Byrne (24 April 1884 – 14 January 1954) was an Irish judge and barrister who served as a Judge of the Supreme Court from 1940 to 1954, a Judge of the High Court from 1926 to 1940 and Attorney General of Ireland from 1924 to 1926.

== Early life ==
He was born on 24 April 1884, the fourth son of Patrick O'Byrne and Mary O'Byrne (née Tallon), of Seskin, County Wicklow. He was educated at the Patrician Monastery, Tullow, County Carlow, and studied Moral and Mental Science at the Royal University, where he graduated in 1907 in First Place with First Class Honours. He was awarded a Master of Arts degree in 1908.

He joined the Irish Land Commission, where he acquired an intimate knowledge of the system of real property and land tenure in Ireland. Subsequently, he studied at King's Inns, Dublin, and was called to the Irish Bar in 1911, where he practised mainly in real property.

He stood as a pro-Treaty Sinn Féin candidate at the 1922 general election for the Wexford constituency but was not elected. In 1922, he was appointed by the Provisional Government of the Irish Free State to the Irish Free State Constitution Commission to draft the Constitution of the Irish Free State, commonly known as the Irish Free State Constitution Commission. It prepared a draft Constitution. He was thus one of the constitutional architects of the Irish Free State.

In 1923, he was appointed to the Judiciary Commission by the Government of the Irish Free State, on a reference from the Government to establish a new system for the administration of justice in accordance with the Constitution of the Irish Free State. The Judiciary Commission was chaired by the last Lord Chief Justice of Ireland (who had also been the last Lord Chancellor of Ireland). It drafted legislation for a new system of courts, including a High Court and a Supreme Court, and provided for the abolition of the Irish Court of Appeal.

He was appointed King's Counsel in 1924, becoming the last member of counsel in the Irish Free State to be appointed, thereafter counsel were appointed as Senior Counsel. He was also a delegate of the Irish Free State to the League of Nations in the same year.

== Legal career ==
On 7 June 1924, he was appointed the second Attorney-General of the Irish Free State when Hugh Kennedy was appointed Chief Justice of Ireland.

== Judicial career ==
On 9 January 1926, he was appointed a High Court judge, upon which he served until he was elevated to the bench of the Supreme Court of Ireland in 1940. He was also Chairman of the Irish Legal Terms Advisory Committee from 14 May 1948 to 13 May 1953.

== Reputation on the bench ==
Another High Court judge, Kenneth Deale writing extrajudicially in "Beyond Any Reasonable Doubt?", a collection of essays on celebrated Irish murder trials, offers some interesting insights into O'Byrne's strengths and weaknesses as a judge. Deale praises him as a sound and experienced lawyer, conscientious, principled and level-headed. However, he believed that O'Byrne had one serious flaw- he was excessively strong-minded and having made up his mind was most reluctant to change it. This in Deale's view was a serious fault in a judge especially in criminal trials, where Deale found it hard to believe that a jury would not be greatly influenced by the summing up of so formidable and strong-minded a judge. In particular, Deale strongly criticised his conduct of the trial of Thomas Kelly, tried in 1936 for the murder of Patrick Henry. In Deale's view, O'Byrne's summing-up was designed to convince the jury that the accused was guilty (Kelly, after an unprecedented three trials, was found guilty, but the Government, which seems to have had some doubts about his guilt, reprieved him from the death penalty).

== Personal life ==
He married Margaret (Marjorie) McGuire in 1924; and they had five children. They lived at Stonehurst, Killiney, County Dublin. He died in office on 14 January 1954. His widow brought a celebrated test case arguing that judges could not be required to pay income tax as this breached the Constitutional guarantee that their incomes can not be reduced. The Supreme Court decided by a 3–2 majority that notwithstanding the guarantee, judges are liable to pay income tax.

One of his sons was Paddy O'Byrne who became one of the best known radio presenters in South Africa.

Legal offices
Preceded by Hugh Kennedy	Attorney-General of Ireland; 1924–1926	Succeeded by John A. Costello
