= 4th Dáil =

TDs from 1923 to 1927

←	3rd Dáil	5th Dáil	→

Overview
- Legislative body: Dáil Éireann
- Jurisdiction: Irish Free State
- Meeting place: Leinster House
- Term: 19 September 1923 – 20 May 1927
- Election: 1923 general election
- Government: 2nd executive council
- Members: 153
- Ceann Comhairle: Michael Hayes
- President of the Executive Council: W. T. Cosgrave
- Vice-President of the Executive Council: Kevin O'Higgins
- Chief Whip: James Dolan — Daniel McCarthy until 31 March 1924
- Leader of the Opposition: Thomas Johnson

Sessions
- 1st: 19 September 1923 – 12 August 1924
- 2nd: 15 October 1924 – 8 July 1925
- 3rd: 3 November 1925 – 21 July 1926
- 4th: 16 November 1926 – 20 May 1927

The 4th Dáil was elected at the 1923 general election on 27 August 1923 and met on 19 September 1923. The members of Dáil Éireann, the Chamber of Deputies of the Oireachtas (legislature) of the Irish Free State, are known as TDs. It was one of two houses of the Oireachtas, sitting with the First Seanad constituted as the 1922 Seanad and the 1925 Seanad. Although Cumann na nGaedheal did not have a majority, it was able to govern due to the absence of Republicans (Anti-Treaty Sinn Féin) who refused to attend.

The 4th Dáil was dissolved by Governor-General Tim Healy on 23 May 1927, at the request of the President of the Executive Council W. T. Cosgrave. The 4th Dáil lasted 3 years, 246 days.

== Composition of the 4th Dáil ==
- 2nd Executive Council

Party	Aug. 1923	May 1927	Change
Cumann na nGaedheal	63	57	▼6
Republican	44	27	▼17
Farmers' Party	15	14	▼1
Labour	14	15	▲1
Businessmen's Party	2	2	Steady
Fianna Fáil	—N/a	19	▲19
Clann Éireann	—N/a	3	▲3
National League	—N/a	2	▲2
Independent	15	12	▼3
Ceann Comhairle	—N/a	1	▲1
Vacant	—N/a	1	▲1
Total	153		

In line with its policy of abstentionism, the Republican TDs did not take their seats. Fianna Fáil split from Sinn Féin in March 1926, and also maintained a policy of abstention throughout the 4th Dáil. This made a functional majority of only 55 seats. Labour formed the lead party of opposition in the absence of the Republican TDs.

The 2nd executive was formed by Cumann na nGaedheal.

=== Graphical representation ===
This is a graphical comparison of party strengths in the 4th Dáil from September 1923. This was not the official seating plan. The Republican members did not take their seats.

== Ceann Comhairle ==
On 19 September 1923, Michael Hayes (CnaG), the outgoing Ceann Comhairle, was proposed by W. T. Cosgrave and seconded by Thomas Johnson for the position, and was approved without a vote.

== TDs by constituency ==
The list of the 153 TDs elected is given in alphabetical order by Dáil constituency.

Members of the 4th Dáil
Constituency	Name	Party
Carlow–Kilkenny	W. T. Cosgrave	Cumann na nGaedheal
Carlow–Kilkenny	Edward Doyle	Labour
Carlow–Kilkenny	Seán Gibbons	Cumann na nGaedheal
Carlow–Kilkenny	Denis Gorey	Farmers' Party
Carlow–Kilkenny	Michael Shelly	Republican
Cavan	Patrick Baxter	Farmers' Party
Cavan	John James Cole	Independent
Cavan	Seán Milroy	Cumann na nGaedheal
Cavan	Patrick Smith	Republican
Clare	Éamon de Valera	Republican
Clare	Conor Hogan	Farmers' Party
Clare	Patrick Hogan	Labour
Clare	Eoin MacNeill (Note: Eoin MacNeill was elected for two constituencies; Clare and the National University. He chose to sit for Clare.)	Cumann na nGaedheal
Clare	Brian O'Higgins	Republican
Cork Borough	Richard Beamish (Note: Andrew O'Shaughnessy and Richard Beamish were elected under the label of Cork Progressive Association, a group associated with the Businessmen's Party.)	Independent
Cork Borough	Mary MacSwiney	Republican
Cork Borough	Alfred O'Rahilly	Cumann na nGaedheal
Cork Borough	Andrew O'Shaughnessy	Independent
Cork Borough	J. J. Walsh	Cumann na nGaedheal
Cork East	John Daly	Independent
Cork East	John Dinneen	Farmers' Party
Cork East	Michael Hennessy	Cumann na nGaedheal
Cork East	David Kent	Republican
Cork East	Thomas O'Mahony	Cumann na nGaedheal
Cork North	Daniel Corkery	Republican
Cork North	Thomas Nagle	Labour
Cork North	Daniel Vaughan	Farmers' Party
Cork West	Seán Buckley	Republican
Cork West	Cornelius Connolly	Cumann na nGaedheal
Cork West	Timothy J. Murphy	Labour
Cork West	Timothy O'Donovan	Farmers' Party
Cork West	John Prior	Cumann na nGaedheal
Donegal	Eugene Doherty	Cumann na nGaedheal
Donegal	Patrick McGoldrick	Cumann na nGaedheal
Donegal	Patrick McFadden	Cumann na nGaedheal
Donegal	James Myles	Independent
Donegal	Joseph O'Doherty	Republican
Donegal	Peadar O'Donnell	Republican
Donegal	Peter Ward	Cumann na nGaedheal
Donegal	John White	Farmers' Party
Dublin North	Alfie Byrne	Independent
Dublin North	Francis Cahill	Cumann na nGaedheal
Dublin North	Margaret Collins-O'Driscoll	Cumann na nGaedheal
Dublin North	William Hewat	Businessmen's Party
Dublin North	Seán McGarry	Cumann na nGaedheal
Dublin North	Richard Mulcahy	Cumann na nGaedheal
Dublin North	Seán T. O'Kelly	Republican
Dublin North	Ernie O'Malley	Republican
Dublin South	Philip Cosgrave	Cumann na nGaedheal
Dublin South	Peadar Doyle	Cumann na nGaedheal
Dublin South	Michael Hayes (Note: Michael Hayes was elected for two constituencies; Dublin South and the National University. He chose to sit for the National University.)	Cumann na nGaedheal
Dublin South	Myles Keogh	Independent
Dublin South	Daniel McCarthy	Cumann na nGaedheal
Dublin South	Constance Markievicz	Republican
Dublin South	Cathal Ó Murchadha	Republican
Dublin County	Bryan Cooper	Independent
Dublin County	Michael Derham	Cumann na nGaedheal
Dublin County	Darrell Figgis	Independent
Dublin County	Desmond FitzGerald	Cumann na nGaedheal
Dublin County	John Good	Businessmen's Party
Dublin County	Thomas Johnson	Labour
Dublin County	Kathleen Lynn	Republican
Dublin County	Kevin O'Higgins	Cumann na nGaedheal
Dublin University	Ernest Alton	Independent
Dublin University	James Craig	Independent
Dublin University	William Thrift	Independent
Galway	Seán Broderick	Cumann na nGaedheal
Galway	James Cosgrave	Independent
Galway	Frank Fahy	Republican
Galway	Patrick Hogan	Cumann na nGaedheal
Galway	Barney Mellows	Republican
Galway	George Nicolls	Cumann na nGaedheal
Galway	Thomas J. O'Connell	Labour
Galway	Louis O'Dea	Republican
Galway	Pádraic Ó Máille	Cumann na nGaedheal
Kerry	Patrick Cahill	Republican
Kerry	James Crowley	Cumann na nGaedheal
Kerry	Fionán Lynch	Cumann na nGaedheal
Kerry	Tom McEllistrim	Republican
Kerry	Thomas O'Donoghue	Republican
Kerry	John O'Sullivan	Cumann na nGaedheal
Kerry	Austin Stack	Republican
Kildare	Hugh Colohan	Labour
Kildare	John Conlan	Farmers' Party
Kildare	George Wolfe	Cumann na nGaedheal
Leitrim–Sligo	Thomas Carter	Cumann na nGaedheal
Leitrim–Sligo	Frank Carty	Republican
Leitrim–Sligo	James Dolan	Cumann na nGaedheal
Leitrim–Sligo	Seán Farrell	Republican
Leitrim–Sligo	John Hennigan	Cumann na nGaedheal
Leitrim–Sligo	Alexander McCabe	Cumann na nGaedheal
Leitrim–Sligo	Martin McGowan	Republican
Laois–Offaly	Laurence Brady	Republican
Laois–Offaly	Francis Bulfin	Cumann na nGaedheal
Laois–Offaly	William Davin	Labour
Laois–Offaly	Patrick Egan	Cumann na nGaedheal
Laois–Offaly	Seán McGuinness	Republican
Limerick	Seán Carroll	Republican
Limerick	Patrick Clancy	Labour
Limerick	James Colbert	Republican
Limerick	John Nolan	Cumann na nGaedheal
Limerick	Richard Hayes	Cumann na nGaedheal
Limerick	Patrick Hogan	Farmers' Party
Limerick	James Ledden	Cumann na nGaedheal
Longford–Westmeath	Conor Byrne	Republican
Longford–Westmeath	James Killane	Republican
Longford–Westmeath	John Lyons	Independent
Longford–Westmeath	Patrick McKenna	Farmers' Party
Longford–Westmeath	Patrick Shaw	Cumann na nGaedheal
Louth	Frank Aiken	Republican
Louth	Peter Hughes	Cumann na nGaedheal
Louth	James Murphy	Cumann na nGaedheal
Mayo North	Henry Coyle	Cumann na nGaedheal
Mayo North	John Crowley	Republican
Mayo North	Joseph McGrath	Cumann na nGaedheal
Mayo North	P. J. Ruttledge	Republican
Mayo South	Michael Kilroy	Republican
Mayo South	Joseph MacBride	Cumann na nGaedheal
Mayo South	Tom Maguire	Republican
Mayo South	Martin Nally	Cumann na nGaedheal
Mayo South	William Sears	Cumann na nGaedheal
Meath	Eamonn Duggan	Cumann na nGaedheal
Meath	David Hall	Labour
Meath	Patrick Mulvany	Farmers' Party
Monaghan	Ernest Blythe	Cumann na nGaedheal
Monaghan	Patrick Duffy	Cumann na nGaedheal
Monaghan	Patrick MacCarvill	Republican
National University	Michael Hayes	Cumann na nGaedheal
National University	Eoin MacNeill	Cumann na nGaedheal
National University	William Magennis	Cumann na nGaedheal
Roscommon	Gerald Boland	Republican
Roscommon	Henry Finlay	Cumann na nGaedheal
Roscommon	Andrew Lavin	Cumann na nGaedheal
Roscommon	George Noble Plunkett	Republican
Tipperary	Dan Breen	Republican
Tipperary	Séamus Burke	Cumann na nGaedheal
Tipperary	Louis Dalton	Cumann na nGaedheal
Tipperary	Michael Heffernan	Farmers' Party
Tipperary	Seán McCurtin (Note: Seán McCurtin did not take his seat until 23 March 1926 due to imprisonment in Northern Ireland.)	Cumann na nGaedheal
Tipperary	Daniel Morrissey	Labour
Tipperary	Patrick Ryan	Republican
Waterford	Caitlín Brugha	Republican
Waterford	John Butler	Labour
Waterford	William Redmond	Independent
Waterford	Nicholas Wall	Farmers' Party
Wexford	Richard Corish	Labour
Wexford	Michael Doyle	Farmers' Party
Wexford	Osmond Esmonde	Cumann na nGaedheal
Wexford	Robert Lambert	Republican
Wexford	James Ryan	Republican
Wicklow	Christopher Byrne	Cumann na nGaedheal
Wicklow	James Everett	Labour
Wicklow	Richard Wilson	Farmers' Party

== Changes ==
Date	Constituency	Loss	Gain	Note
19 September 1923	Dublin South	Cumann na nGaedheal		Michael Hayes resigns to sit for NUI
19 September 1923	National University	Cumann na nGaedheal	Ceann Comhairle	Michael Hayes takes office as Ceann Comhairle
9 October 1923	National University	Cumann na nGaedheal		Eoin MacNeill resigns to sit for Clare
22 October 1923	Dublin South	Cumann na nGaedheal		Death of Philip Cosgrave
27 October 1923	Dublin South		Cumann na nGaedheal	Hugh Kennedy holds the seat vacated by the resignation of Hayes
3 November 1923	NUI		Cumann na nGaedheal	Patrick McGilligan holds the seat vacated by the resignation of MacNeill
20 November 1923	Dublin County	Cumann na nGaedheal		Death of Michael Derham
10 January 1924	Limerick	Cumann na nGaedheal		Resignation of Richard Hayes
12 March 1924	Dublin South		Cumann na nGaedheal	James O'Mara holds the seat vacated by the death of Cosgrave
19 March 1924	Dublin County		Cumann na nGaedheal	Batt O'Connor holds the seat vacated by the death of Derham
April 1924	Mayo North	Cumann na nGaedheal	National Group	Joseph McGrath joins new party as leader
April 1924	Carlow–Kilkenny	Cumann na nGaedheal	National Group	Seán Gibbons joins new party
April 1924	Cavan	Cumann na nGaedheal	National Group	Seán Milroy joins new party
April 1924	Dublin North	Cumann na nGaedheal	National Group	Francis Cahill joins new party
April 1924	Dublin North	Cumann na nGaedheal	National Group	Seán McGarry joins new party
April 1924	Dublin South	Cumann na nGaedheal	National Group	Daniel McCarthy joins new party
April 1924	Leitrim–Sligo	Cumann na nGaedheal	National Group	Thomas Carter joins new party
April 1924	Leitrim–Sligo	Cumann na nGaedheal	National Group	Alexander McCabe joins new party
April 1924	Roscommon	Cumann na nGaedheal	National Group	Henry Finlay joins new party
9 May 1924	Mayo North	Cumann na nGaedheal		Disqualification of Henry Coyle
28 May 1924	Limerick		Cumann na nGaedheal	Richard O'Connell holds the seat vacated by the resignation of Hayes
5 June 1924	Dublin South	Cumann na nGaedheal		Resignation of Hugh Kennedy on appointment as Chief Justice
20 July 1924	Cork East	Cumann na nGaedheal		Death of Thomas O'Mahony
1 August 1924	Cork Borough	Cumann na nGaedheal		Resignation of Alfred O'Rahilly
1 August November 1924	Donegal	Cumann na nGaedheal		Resignation of Peter Ward
29 October 1924	Mayo North	National Group		Resignation of Joseph McGrath
30 October 1924	Carlow–Kilkenny	National Group		Resignation of Seán Gibbons
30 October 1924	Cavan	National Group		Resignation of Seán Milroy
30 October 1924	Dublin North	National Group		Resignation of Francis Cahill
30 October 1924	Dublin North	National Group		Resignation of Seán McGarry
30 October 1924	Dublin South	National Group		Resignation of Daniel McCarthy
30 October 1924	Leitrim–Sligo	National Group		Resignation of Thomas Carter
30 October 1924	Leitrim–Sligo	National Group		Resignation of Alexander McCabe
30 October 1924	Roscommon	National Group		Resignation of Henry Finlay
18 November 1924	Cork East		Cumann na nGaedheal	Michael Noonan holds the seat vacated by the death of O'Mahony
18 November 1924	Dublin South		Republican	Seán Lemass gains the seat vacated by the resignation of Kennedy
18 November 1924	Mayo North		Republican	John Madden gains the seat vacated by the disqualification of Coyle
19 November 1924	Cork Borough		Cumann na nGaedheal	Michael Egan holds the seat vacated by the resignation of O'Rahilly
20 November 1924	Donegal		Cumann na nGaedheal	Denis McCullough holds the seat vacated by the resignation of Ward
11 March 1925	Carlow–Kilkenny		Cumann na nGaedheal	Thomas Bolger holds the seat vacated by the resignation of Gibbons
11 March 1925	Cavan		Cumann na nGaedheal	John Joe O'Reilly holds the seat vacated by the resignation of Milroy
11 March 1925	Dublin North		Cumann na nGaedheal	Patrick Leonard holds the seat vacated by the resignation of Cahill
11 March 1925	Dublin North		Republican	Oscar Traynor gains the seat vacated by the resignation of McGarry
11 March 1925	Dublin South		Cumann na nGaedheal	Thomas Hennessy holds the seat vacated by the resignation of McCarthy
11 March 1925	Leitrim–Sligo		Republican	Samuel Holt gains the seat vacated by the resignation of Carter
11 March 1925	Leitrim–Sligo		Cumann na nGaedheal	Martin Roddy holds the seat vacated by the resignation of McCabe
11 March 1925	Mayo North		Cumann na nGaedheal	Michael Tierney holds the seat vacated by the resignation of McGrath
11 March 1925	Roscommon		Cumann na nGaedheal	Martin Conlon holds the seat vacated by the resignation of Finlay
27 October 1926	Dublin County	Independent		Death of Darrell Figgis
30 November 1925	Leix–Offaly	Republican		Disqualification of Seán McGuinness
25 January 1926	National University	Cumann na nGaedheal	Clann Éireann	William Magennis joins new party
25 January 1926	Galway	Cumann na nGaedheal	Clann Éireann	Pádraic Ó Máille joins new party
25 January 1926	Wicklow	Cumann na nGaedheal	Clann Éireann	Christopher Byrne joins new party
18 February 1926	Dublin County		Labour	William Norton gains the seat vacated by the death of Figgis
18 February 1926	Leix–Offaly		Cumann na nGaedheal	James Dwyer gains the seat vacated by the disqualification of McGuinness
16 May 1926	Clare	Republican	Fianna Fáil	Éamon de Valera founds new party Fianna Fáil as party leader
1926	Louth	Republican	Fianna Fáil	Frank Aiken joins new party
1926	Roscommon	Republican	Fianna Fáil	Gerald Boland joins new party
1926	Tipperary	Republican	Fianna Fáil	Dan Breen joins new party
1926	Leitrim–Sligo	Republican	Fianna Fáil	Frank Carty joins new party
1926	Limerick	Republican	Fianna Fáil	James Colbert joins new party
1926	Galway	Republican	Fianna Fáil	Frank Fahy joins new party
1926	Leitrim–Sligo	Republican	Fianna Fáil	Samuel Holt joins new party
1926	Longford–Westmeath	Republican	Fianna Fáil	James Killane joins new party
1926	Mayo South	Republican	Fianna Fáil	Michael Kilroy joins new party
1926	Dublin South	Republican	Fianna Fáil	Seán Lemass joins new party
1926	Monaghan	Republican	Fianna Fáil	Patrick MacCarvill joins new party
1926	Dublin South	Republican	Fianna Fáil	Constance Markievicz joins new party
1926	Kerry	Republican	Fianna Fáil	Tom McEllistrim joins new party
1926	Dublin North	Republican	Fianna Fáil	Seán T. O'Kelly joins new party
1926	Donegal	Republican	Fianna Fáil	Joseph O'Doherty joins new party
1926	Dublin North	Republican	Fianna Fáil	Seán T. O'Kelly joins new party
1926	Mayo North	Republican	Fianna Fáil	P. J. Ruttledge joins new party
1926	Leitrim–Sligo	Republican	Fianna Fáil	Frank Carty joins new party
1926	Wexford	Republican	Fianna Fáil	James Ryan joins new party
1926	Carlow–Kilkenny	Republican	Fianna Fáil	Michael Shelly joins new party
1926	Cavan	Republican	Fianna Fáil	Patrick Smith joins new party
September 1926	Waterford	Independent	National League	William Redmond joins new party as founder member
September 1926	Galway	Independent	National League	James Cosgrave joins new party as founder member
19 January 1927	Limerick	Cumann na nGaedheal		Death of James Ledden
25 January 1927	Tipperary	Fianna Fáil	Ind. Republican	Dan Breen takes the Oath of Allegiance
May 1927	Carlow–Kilkenny	Farmers' Party	Cumann na nGaedheal	Denis Gorey selected as candidate for Cumann na nGaedheal
