= March 1925 Dáil by-elections =

By-elections to the 4th Dáil

The March 1925 Dáil by-elections were held in seven Dáil constituencies to fill nine vacancies in the 4th Dáil. They occurred following the resignation from the Dáil of members of the National Group, who had each been elected at the 1923 general election as TDs for Cumann na nGaedheal. It has been described as a "mini-general election". It is the only occasion at a Dáil by-election in which more than one seat was filled within the same constituency; this occurred in Dublin North and Leitrim–Sligo.

== Background ==
In March 1924, Joseph McGrath, the Minister for Industry and Commerce, resigned from the Executive Council in the aftermath of differences in the handling of the Army Mutiny. He left Cumann na nGaedheal and set up a new organisation, ultimately known as the National Group.

On 29 October 1924, McGrath resigned from the Dáil. The following day, eight other National Group members also resigned. One further member, Osmond Esmonde, was out of the country at the time of the resignations, and did not resign.

== Timing ==
On 18 February 1925, James Dolan, the Government Chief Whip moved motions to issue the writ of election to fill the vacancies. Osmond Esmonde objected to the fact that the government moved the motion, against "that the practice [...] to reserve to the Party to which the deceased or resigned member belonged the right of moving for the writ". The motions were agreed to.

== Results ==
The by-elections were held on 11 March 1925. Seán Milroy was the only one of the former TDs to seek re-election, contesting in Dublin North rather than his former constituency of Cavan. Seven of the seats were won by Cumann na nGaedheal candidates, with two won by abstentionist candidates of Sinn Féin, led by Éamon de Valera.

=== Carlow–Kilkenny ===
Resignation of Seán Gibbons.

Carlow–Kilkenny
Party	Candidate	FPv%	Count
Party	Candidate	FPv%	1
Cumann na nGaedheal	Thomas Bolger	58.9	24,142
Republican	Michael Barry	41.1	16,830
Electorate: 63,112 Valid: 40,972 Quota: 20,487 Turnout: 64.9%

=== Cavan ===
Resignation of Seán Milroy.

Cavan
Party	Candidate	FPv%	Count	
Party	Candidate	FPv%	1	2
Cumann na nGaedheal	John Joe O'Reilly	38.5	12,560	12,980
Farmers' Party	John O'Hanlon	31.5	10,285	12,119
Republican	Philip Baxter	30.0	9,774	
Electorate: 54,419 Valid: 32,619 Quota: 16,310 Turnout: 59.9%

=== Dublin North (2 seats) ===
Resignations of Francis Cahill and Seán McGarry.

Dublin North
Party	Candidate	FPv%	Count			
Party	Candidate	FPv%	1	2	3	4
Cumann na nGaedheal	Patrick Leonard	34.8	17,329			
Republican	Oscar Traynor	31.3	15,598	15,603	15,888	16,360
Labour	Denis Cullen	16.9	8,422	8,466	9,195	13,957
Cumann na nGaedheal	Donal O'Connor	12.6	6,294	6,938	7,798	
National Group	Seán Milroy	4.4	2,188	2,213		
Electorate: 90,280 Valid: 49,831 Quota: 16,611 Turnout: 55.2%

=== Dublin South ===
Resignation of Daniel McCarthy.

Dublin South
Party	Candidate	FPv%	Count
Party	Candidate	FPv%	1
Cumann na nGaedheal	Thomas Hennessy	57.0	24,075
Republican	Michael O'Mullane	32.9	13,900
Labour	Thomas Lawlor	10.0	4,237
Electorate: 78,353 Valid: 42,212 Quota: 21,107 Turnout: 53.9%

=== Leitrim–Sligo (2 seats) ===
Resignations of Thomas Carter and Alexander McCabe.

Leitrim–Sligo
Party	Candidate	FPv%	Count	
Party	Candidate	FPv%	1	2
Cumann na nGaedheal	Martin Roddy	32.9	16,332	16,868
Cumann na nGaedheal	Andrew Mooney	28.3	14,054	14,343
Republican	Samuel Holt	20.3	10,062	18,287
Republican	Frank O'Beirne	18.6	9,232	
Electorate: 79,234 Valid: 49,680 Quota: 16,561 Turnout: 62.7%

=== Mayo North ===
Resignation of Joseph McGrath.

Mayo North
Party	Candidate	FPv%	Count
Party	Candidate	FPv%	1
Cumann na nGaedheal	Michael Tierney	57.7	18,385
Republican	Thomas Derrig	42.3	13,458
Electorate: 46,134 Valid: 31,843 Quota: 15,922 Turnout: 69.0%

=== Roscommon ===
Resignation of Henry Finlay.

Roscommon
Party	Candidate	FPv%	Count
Party	Candidate	FPv%	1
Cumann na nGaedheal	Martin Conlon	61.2	21,118
Republican	John J. O'Kelly	38.8	13,410
Electorate: 52,929 Valid: 34,528 Quota: 17,265 Turnout: 65.2%

== Sources ==
- Gallagher, Michael (2009). Irish Elections 1948–77: Results and Analysis Sources for the Study of Irish Politics 2. Routledge. ISBN 9781138973343.
