= Dublin Mid =

Dáil constituency (1921–1923)

- Former Dáil constituency

Former constituency
- Created: 1921
- Abolished: 1923
- Seats: 4
- Local government area: Dublin City
- Created from: Dublin College Green; Dublin Harbour
- Replaced by: Dublin North

Dublin Mid was a parliamentary constituency represented in Dáil Éireann, the lower house of the Irish parliament or Oireachtas from 1921 to 1923. The constituency elected 4 deputies (Teachtaí Dála, commonly known as TDs) to the Dáil, using proportional representation by means of the single transferable vote (PR-STV).

== History ==
The constituency was created in 1921 out of portions of the UK Parliament constituencies of Dublin College Green and Dublin Harbour. It was a four-seat constituency, under the Government of Ireland Act 1920, for the 1921 election to the House of Commons of Southern Ireland, whose members formed the Second Dáil. It was abolished under the Electoral Act 1923.

== Boundaries ==
The constituency consisted of the College Green and the Dublin Harbour divisions of Dublin city.

== TDs ==
Teachtaí Dála (TDs) for Dublin Mid 1921–1923
Key to parties: SF = Sinn Féin; Ind. = Independent; AT-SF = Sinn Féin (Anti-Treaty); PT-SF = Sinn Féin (Pro-Treaty)
Dáil	Election	Deputy (Party)	Deputy (Party)	Deputy (Party)	Deputy (Party)
2nd	1921	Seán McGarry (SF)	Seán T. O'Kelly (SF)	Philip Shanahan (SF)	Kathleen Clarke (SF)
3rd	1922	Seán McGarry (PT-SF)	Seán T. O'Kelly (AT-SF)	Alfie Byrne (Ind.)	Laurence O'Neill (Ind.)
4th	1923	Constituency abolished. See Dublin North			

Note: The columns in this table are used only for presentational purposes, and no significance should be attached to the order of columns. For details of the order in which seats were won at each election, see the detailed results of that election.

== Elections ==
*: Outgoing TD

=== 1922 general election ===
1922 general election: Dublin Mid
Party	Candidate	FPv%	Count					
Party	Candidate	FPv%	1	2	3	4	5	6
Independent	Laurence O'Neill	32.5	9,465					
Independent	Alfie Byrne	27.1	7,899					
Sinn Féin (Pro-Treaty)	Seán McGarry	14.7	4,295	5,755	6,495			
Sinn Féin (Anti-Treaty)	Philip Shanahan	7.5	2,172	2,639	2,866	2,965	3,393	
Sinn Féin (Anti-Treaty)	Seán T. O'Kelly	6.7	1,941	2,490	2,680	2,902	4,251	6,896
Independent	Henry Barnardo	6.2	1,800	2,772	3,551	3,834	3,883	4,053
Sinn Féin (Anti-Treaty)	Kathleen Clarke	5.3	1,557	1,748	1,885	1,921		
Electorate: 41,440 Valid: 29,129 Quota: 5,826 Turnout: 70.3%

=== 1921 general election ===
1921 general election: Dublin Mid (uncontested)
Party	Candidate
Sinn Féin	Kathleen Clarke
Sinn Féin	Seán McGarry
Sinn Féin	Seán T. O'Kelly
Sinn Féin	Philip Shanahan

== See also ==
- Dáil constituencies
- Politics of the Republic of Ireland
- Historic Dáil constituencies
- Elections in the Republic of Ireland
