= Dublin North (Dáil constituency) =

Dáil constituency (1923–1937, 1981–2016)

- Former Dáil constituency
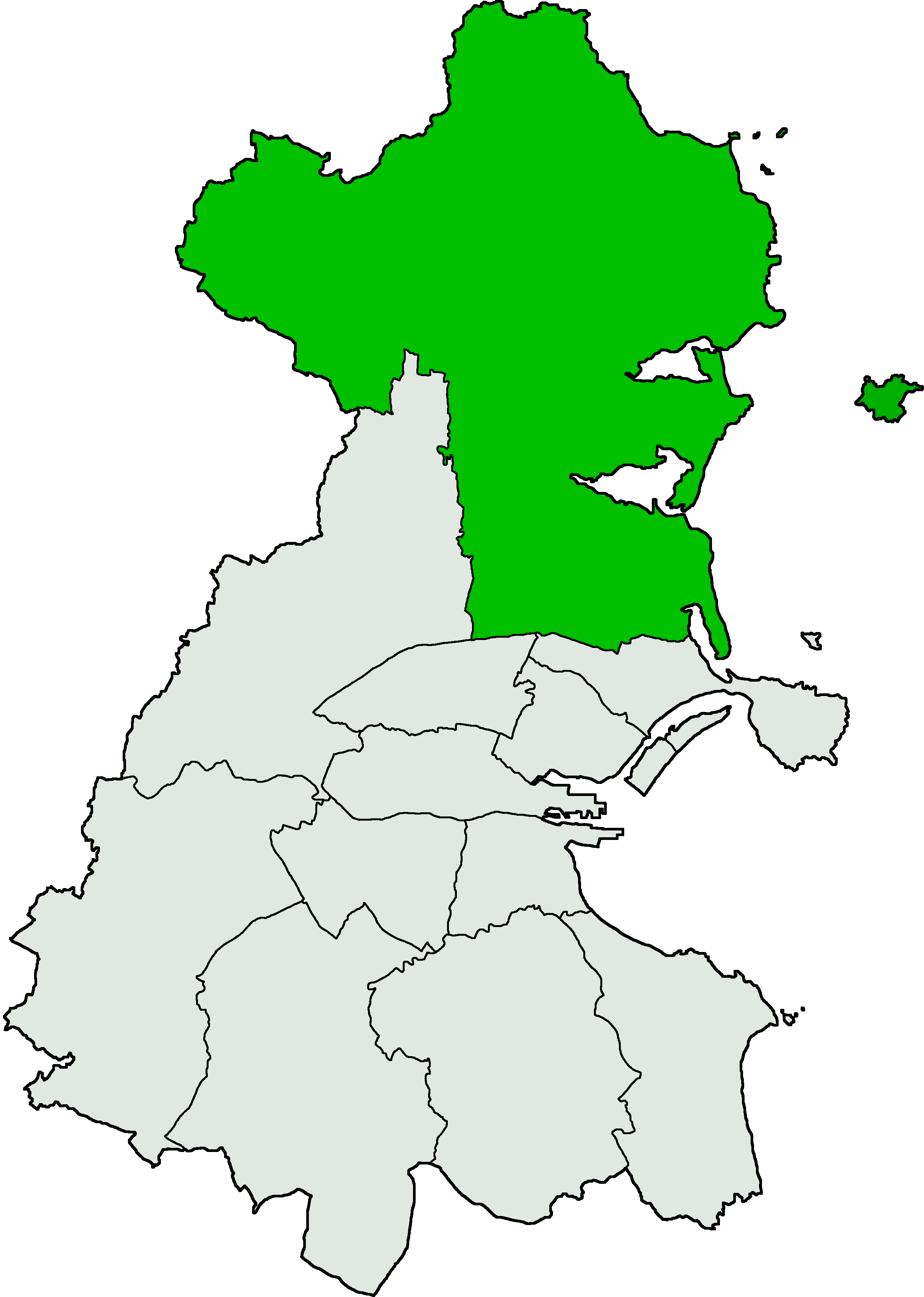
- Location of Dublin North within County Dublin

Former constituency
- Created: 1981
- Abolished: 2016
- Seats: 3 (1981–1992); 4 (1992–2016)
- Local government areas: County Dublin (to 1994); Fingal (from 1994)
- Created from: Dublin County North
- Replaced by: Dublin Fingal

Dublin North
- Former Dáil constituency

Former constituency
- Created: 1923
- Abolished: 1937
- Seats: 8
- Local government area: Dublin City
- Created from: Dublin Mid; Dublin North-West
- Replaced by: Dublin North-East; Dublin North-West

Dublin North was a parliamentary constituency represented in Dáil Éireann, the lower house of the Irish parliament or Oireachtas, from 1981 to 2016, representing an area in the north of County Dublin (later Fingal). A previous constituency of the same existed in Dublin City from 1923 to 1937. The method of election was proportional representation by means of the single transferable vote (PR-STV).

== Boundaries ==
=== 1923–1937 ===
Dublin North was created under the Electoral Act 1923 as an eight-seat borough constituency on the northside of Dublin city from territory that had been part of the Dublin Mid and Dublin North-West constituencies. It was defined by borough electoral areas, each of which contained one or more wards: Dublin No. 1 [Arran Quay], Dublin No. 2 [Clontarf East, Clontarf West, Drumcondra and Glasnevin], Dublin No. 4 [Inns' Quay and Rotunda], Dublin No. 6 [Mountjoy] and Dublin No. 8 [North City and North Dock].

It was abolished with effect at the 1937 general election, when it was replaced by the constituencies of Dublin North-East (3 seats) and Dublin North-West (5 seats).

=== 1981–2016 ===
A constituency of the same name was created by the Electoral (Amendment) Act 1980 and was first used at the 1981 general election. It was in the northern area of County Dublin (later Fingal), and included the towns of Balbriggan and Malahide, Lusk, Rush, Donabate and Skerries. It was superseded by Dublin Fingal at the 2016 general election.

Changes to the Dublin North constituency 1981–2016
Years	TDs	Boundaries	Notes
1981–1992	3	In County Dublin the district electoral divisions of Balbriggan Rural, Balbriggan Urban, Ballyboghill, Balscadden, Blanchardstown (except the part thereof which is comprised in the constituency of Dublin West), Clonmethan, Donabate, Finglas (except the parts thereof which are comprised in the constituencies of Dublin North-West and Dublin West), Garristown, Hollywood, Holmpatrick, Kilsallaghan, Kinsaley, Lusk, Malahide, Rush, Skerries, Swords East and Swords West; and the townlands of: Ballymacartle, Bohammer, Burgage, Clonshagh, Maynetown, Saintdoolaghs, Snugborough, in the district electoral division of Coolock; Coultry, Ballymun, Huntstown, Silloge, in the district electoral division of Drumcondra Rural Number One; Ballymun, Ballystruan, Collinstown, Commons, Coultry, Dardistown, Huntstown, Rock, Santry (the part thereof situated north of a line drawn along the centre of Coolock Lane), Santry Demesne, Turnapin Great, Turnapin Little, in the district electoral division of Drumcondra Rural Number Two.	New constituency, with Balbriggan Rural, Balbriggan Urban, Ballyboghil, Balscadden, part of Coolock, Clonmethan, Donabate, part of Drumcondra Rural Number One, part of Finglas, Garristown, Hollywood, Holmpatrick, Kilsallaghan, Kinsaley, Lusk, Malahide, Rush, Skerries, Swords East, Swords West from Dublin County North; and part of Blanchardstown from Dublin County West
1992–1997	4	In County Dublin, the district electoral divisions of Airport, Balbriggan Rural, Balbriggan Urban, Balgriffin, Ballyboghil, Balscadden, Blanchardstown-Abbotstown, Blanchardstown-Corduff, Blanchardstown-Mulhuddart, Blanchardstown-Tyrrelstown, Castleknock Park, Clonmethan, Donabate, Dubber, Garristown, Hollywood, Holmpatrick, Kilsallaghan, Kinsaley, Lusk, Malahide East, Malahide West, Portmarnock North, Portmarnock South, Rush, Skerries, Swords-Forrest, Swords-Glasmore, Swords-Lissenhall, Swords-Seatown, Swords Village, The Ward, Turnapin.	Transfer of the part of the Dublin West constituency situated north of the Navan Road and the Castleknock Road; and minor adjustments with Dublin North-Central, Dublin North-East and Dublin North-West to bring the constituency into alignment with the city boundary.
1997–2002	4	In Fingal, the electoral divisions of Airport, Balbriggan Rural, Balbriggan Urban, Balgriffin, Ballyboghil, Balscadden, Clonmethan, Donabate, Dubber, Garristown, Hollywood, Holmpatrick, Kilsallaghan, Kinsaley, Lusk, Malahide East, Malahide West, Portmarnock North, Portmarnock South, Rush, Skerries, Swords-Forrest, Swords-Glasmore, Swords-Lissenhall, Swords-Seatown, Swords Village, The Ward, Turnapin.	Transfer of Blanchardstown-Abbotstown, Blanchardstown-Corduff, Blanchardstown-Mulhuddart, Blanchardstown-Tyrrelstown, Castleknock Park to Dublin West.
2002–2007	3	In Fingal, the electoral divisions of Balbriggan Rural, Balbriggan Urban, Balgriffin, Ballyboghil, Balscadden, Clonmethan, Donabate, Garristown, Hollywood, Holmpatrick, Kilsallaghan, Kinsaley, Lusk, Malahide East, Malahide West, Portmarnock North, Portmarnock South, Rush, Skerries, Swords-Forrest, Swords-Glasmore, Swords-Lissenhall, Swords-Seatown, Swords Village; and those parts of the electoral divisions of Airport, Dubber, Priorswood A, Priorswood B, Priorswood C, The Ward and Turnapin situated north of a line drawn as follows: commencing at the intersection of the southwestern boundary of the electoral division of The Ward by the M50 Northern Cross, thence commencing in a north-easterly direction and proceeding along the said M50 and the N32 (Northern Cross Extension) to the intersection of the said N32 by the eastern boundary of the electoral division of Priorswood C, passing in a clockwise direction around and excluding the following three roundabouts, viz. roundabout No. 3 at the junction of the M50 Northern Cross with the M1 Motorway, the roundabout at the junction of the N32 (Northern Cross Extension) with Clonshaugh Road and the roundabout at the junction of the N32 (Northern Cross Extension) with the Malahide Road.	Loss of territory to align its southern boundary with the M50 and its Malahide Road extension.
2007–2011	3	In Fingal, the electoral divisions of Balbriggan Rural, Balbriggan Urban, Balgriffin, Ballyboghil, Balscadden, Clonmethan, Donabate, Garristown, Hollywood, Holmpatrick, Kinsaley, Lusk, Malahide East, Malahide West, Portmarnock North, Portmarnock South, Rush, Skerries, Swords-Forrest, Swords-Glasmore, Swords-Lissenhall, Swords-Seatown, Swords Village; and those parts of the electoral divisions of Airport and Turnapin situated north of a line drawn along the Northern Cross Route (M50), passing in a clockwise direction around and excluding roundabout No. 3 at the junction of the Northern Cross Route (M50) with the M1 motorway; and, in Dublin City, those parts of the electoral divisions of Priorswood A, Priorswood B and Priorswood C situated north of a line drawn along the Northern Cross Route (M50) and the Northern Cross Extension (N32), passing in a clockwise direction around and excluding the following three roundabouts, viz. roundabout No. 3 at the junction of the Northern Cross Route (M50) with the M1 Motorway, the roundabout at the junction of the Northern Cross Route (M50) with Clonshaugh Road and the roundabout at the junction of the Northern Cross Extension (N32) with Malahide Road (R107).	Transfer of part of Blanchardstown-Abbotstown to Dublin North-West, and of Kilsallaghan and part of Dubber and The Ward to Dublin West.
2011–2016	4	In Fingal, the electoral divisions of Balbriggan Rural, Balbriggan Urban, Ballyboghil, Balscadden, Clonmethan, Donabate, Garristown, Hollywood, Holmpatrick, Kinsaley, Lusk, Malahide East, Malahide West, Rush, Skerries, Swords-Glasmore, Swords-Lissenhall, Swords-Seatown, Swords Village.	Transfer of Balgriffin, Portmarnock North, Portmarnock South and balance of Turnapin, Priorswood A, Priorswood B and Priorswood C (part north of N32) to Dublin North-East; transfer of Swords-Forrest and balance of Airport to Dublin West.

== TDs ==
=== TDs 1923–1937 ===
Teachtaí Dála (TDs) for Dublin North 1923–1937
Key to parties: BP = Businessmen's Party; CnaG = Cumann na nGaedheal; FF = Fianna Fáil; Ind. = Independent; IWL = Irish Worker League; Lab = Labour; Rep = Republican; SF = Sinn Féin
Dáil	Election	Deputy (Party)	Deputy (Party)	Deputy (Party)	Deputy (Party)	Deputy (Party)	Deputy (Party)	Deputy (Party)	Deputy (Party)
4th	1923	Alfie Byrne (Ind.)	Francis Cahill (CnaG)	Margaret Collins-O'Driscoll (CnaG)	Seán McGarry (CnaG)	William Hewat (BP)	Richard Mulcahy (CnaG)	Seán T. O'Kelly (Rep)	Ernie O'Malley (Rep)
4th	1925 by-election	Alfie Byrne (Ind.)	Patrick Leonard (CnaG)	Margaret Collins-O'Driscoll (CnaG)	Oscar Traynor (Rep)	William Hewat (BP)	Richard Mulcahy (CnaG)	Seán T. O'Kelly (Rep)	Ernie O'Malley (Rep)
5th	1927 (Jun)	Alfie Byrne (Ind.)	John Byrne (CnaG)	Margaret Collins-O'Driscoll (CnaG)	Oscar Traynor (SF)	Denis Cullen (Lab)	Richard Mulcahy (CnaG)	Seán T. O'Kelly (FF)	Kathleen Clarke (FF)
6th	1927 (Sep)	Alfie Byrne (Ind.)	John Byrne (CnaG)	Margaret Collins-O'Driscoll (CnaG)	Patrick Leonard (CnaG)	James Larkin (IWL)	Richard Mulcahy (CnaG)	Seán T. O'Kelly (FF)	Eamonn Cooney (FF)
6th	1928 by-election	Alfie Byrne (Ind.)	John Byrne (CnaG)	Margaret Collins-O'Driscoll (CnaG)	Patrick Leonard (CnaG)	Vincent Rice (CnaG)	Richard Mulcahy (CnaG)	Seán T. O'Kelly (FF)	Eamonn Cooney (FF)
6th	1929 by-election	Thomas F. O'Higgins (CnaG)	John Byrne (CnaG)	Margaret Collins-O'Driscoll (CnaG)	Patrick Leonard (CnaG)	Vincent Rice (CnaG)	Richard Mulcahy (CnaG)	Seán T. O'Kelly (FF)	Eamonn Cooney (FF)
7th	1932	Alfie Byrne (Ind.)	John Byrne (CnaG)	Margaret Collins-O'Driscoll (CnaG)	Oscar Traynor (FF)	Cormac Breathnach (FF)	Richard Mulcahy (CnaG)	Seán T. O'Kelly (FF)	Eamonn Cooney (FF)
8th	1933	Alfie Byrne (Ind.)	Patrick Belton (CnaG)	Vincent Rice (CnaG)	Oscar Traynor (FF)	Cormac Breathnach (FF)	Richard Mulcahy (CnaG)	Seán T. O'Kelly (FF)	Eamonn Cooney (FF)
9th	1937	Constituency abolished. See Dublin North-East and Dublin North-West							

Note: The columns in this table are used only for presentational purposes, and no significance should be attached to the order of columns. For details of the order in which seats were won at each election, see the detailed results of that election.

=== TDs 1981–2016 ===
Note that the boundaries of Dublin North from 1981–2016 share no common territory with the 1923–1937 boundaries. See §Boundaries

Teachtaí Dála (TDs) for Dublin North 1981–2016
Key to parties: FF = Fianna Fáil; FG = Fine Gael; GP = Green; Lab = Labour; SP = Socialist Party
Dáil	Election	Deputy (Party)	Deputy (Party)	Deputy (Party)	Deputy (Party)
22nd	1981	Ray Burke (FF)	John Boland (FG)	Nora Owen (FG)	3 seats 1981–1992
23rd	1982 (Feb)	Ray Burke (FF)	John Boland (FG)	Nora Owen (FG)	3 seats 1981–1992
24th	1982 (Nov)	Ray Burke (FF)	John Boland (FG)	Nora Owen (FG)	3 seats 1981–1992
25th	1987	Ray Burke (FF)	John Boland (FG)	G. V. Wright (FF)	3 seats 1981–1992
26th	1989	Ray Burke (FF)	Nora Owen (FG)	Seán Ryan (Lab)	3 seats 1981–1992
27th	1992	Ray Burke (FF)	Nora Owen (FG)	Seán Ryan (Lab)	Trevor Sargent (GP)
28th	1997	Ray Burke (FF)	Nora Owen (FG)	G. V. Wright (FF)	Trevor Sargent (GP)
28th	1998 by-election	Seán Ryan (Lab)	Nora Owen (FG)	G. V. Wright (FF)	Trevor Sargent (GP)
29th	2002	Seán Ryan (Lab)	Jim Glennon (FF)	G. V. Wright (FF)	Trevor Sargent (GP)
30th	2007	James Reilly (FG)	Michael Kennedy (FF)	Darragh O'Brien (FF)	Trevor Sargent (GP)
31st	2011	James Reilly (FG)	Alan Farrell (FG)	Brendan Ryan (Lab)	Clare Daly (SP)
32nd	2016	Constituency abolished. See Dublin Fingal			

Note: The columns in this table are used only for presentational purposes, and no significance should be attached to the order of columns. For details of the order in which seats were won at each election, see the detailed results of that election.

== Elections ==
*: Outgoing TD

=== 2011 general election ===
2011 general election: Dublin North
Party	Candidate	FPv%	Count						
Party	Candidate	FPv%	1	2	3	4	5	6	7
Fine Gael	James Reilly	20.6	10,178						
Labour	Brendan Ryan	19.9	9,809	9,868	10,058				
Socialist Party	Clare Daly (Note: Daly campaigned as a member of the United Left Alliance.)	15.2	7,513	7,533	7,875	9,096	9,465	11,172	
Fine Gael	Alan Farrell	10.8	5,310	5,475	5,723	6,406	6,669	8,450	9,159
Green	Trevor Sargent	8.5	4,186	4,213	4,483	5,169	5,610		
Fianna Fáil	Darragh O'Brien	8.3	4,115	4,124	4,249	4,407	6,886	7,821	8,067
Fianna Fáil	Michael Kennedy	7.1	3,519	3,531	3,604	3,805			
Labour	Tom Kelleher	6.5	3,205	3,215	3,367				
Independent	Mark Harrold	3.1	1,512	1,518					
Electorate: 70,413 Valid: 49,347 Spoilt: 452 (0.6%) Quota: 9,870 Turnout: 49,799 (70.7%)

=== 2007 general election ===
2007 general election: Dublin North
Party	Candidate	FPv%	Count									
Party	Candidate	FPv%	1	2	3	4	5	6	7	8	9	10
Fianna Fáil	Michael Kennedy	19.9	10,869	10,911	11,266							
Fine Gael	James Reilly	14.0	7,677	7,718	7,927	7,951	8,036	8,281	8,454	9,147	9,706	10,339
Green	Trevor Sargent	13.6	7,448	7,499	7,656	7,680	7,914	8,255	9,414	11,611		
Fianna Fáil	Darragh O'Brien	12.9	7,058	7,083	7,405	7,553	7,700	7,853	7,925	8,427	12,570	
Labour	Brendan Ryan	9.6	5,256	5,294	5,343	5,357	5,514	5,758	5,889	7,323	8,158	9,166
Fianna Fáil	John O'Leary	9.3	5,074	5,108	5,284	5,384	5,536	5,811	5,919	6,404		
Socialist Party	Clare Daly	8.9	4,872	4,960	5,021	5,032	5,504	5,685	5,887			
Green	Joe Corr	3.0	1,659	1,681	1,716	1,721	1,818	1,897				
Sinn Féin	Matt McCormack	2.7	1,454	1,493	1,497	1,498						
Independent	David O'Connor	2.6	1,396	1,453	1,493	1,503	1,593					
Progressive Democrats	Tom Morrissey	2.6	1,395	1,425								
Immigration Control	John Donnelly	0.5	286									
Christian Solidarity	Cathal Loftus	0.4	210									
Electorate: 80,221 Valid: 54,641 Spoilt: 411 (0.7%) Quota: 10,929 Turnout: 55,052 (68.6%)

=== 2002 general election ===
2002 general election: Dublin North
Party	Candidate	FPv%	Count							
Party	Candidate	FPv%	1	2	3	4	5	6	7	8
Green	Trevor Sargent	16.6	7,294	7,380	7,678	7,818	8,118	9,785		
Labour	Seán Ryan	14.5	6,359	6,407	6,535	6,665	6,847	8,578	9,128	
Fianna Fáil	Jim Glennon	13.4	5,892	5,945	6,028	6,152	6,294	6,511	6,596	8,640
Fianna Fáil	G. V. Wright	12.9	5,658	5,707	5,739	5,777	5,868	6,139	6,249	8,617
Socialist Party	Clare Daly	12.5	5,501	5,551	5,730	5,796	6,244	6,590	6,772	7,523
Fianna Fáil	Michael Kennedy	11.9	5,253	5,309	5,368	5,422	5,532	5,732	5,801	
Fine Gael	Nora Owen	9.1	4,012	4,030	4,132	4,720	4,763			
Sinn Féin	Mick Davis	3.1	1,350	1,382	1,424	1,440				
Fine Gael	Cathal Boland	2.7	1,177	1,189	1,216					
Ind. Health Alliance	Ciarán Goulding	2.1	914	1,009						
Independent	Eamon Quinn	0.6	285							
Christian Solidarity	David Walshe	0.6	247							
Electorate: 72,908 Valid: 43,942 Spoilt: N/A Quota: 8,789 Turnout: 43,942 (60.3%)

=== 1998 by-election ===
Following the resignation of Fianna Fáil TD Ray Burke, a by-election was held on 11 March 1998. The seat was won by the Labour Party candidate Seán Ryan.

1998 by-election: Dublin North
Party	Candidate	FPv%	Count													
Party	Candidate	FPv%	1	2	3	4	5	6	7	8	9	10	11	12	13	14
Labour	Seán Ryan	33.3	11,012	11,012	11,017	11,029	11,057	11,216	11,397	11,475	11,555	11,717	12,049	12,832	14,320	16,896
Fianna Fáil	Michael Kennedy	31.3	10,334	10,335	10,336	10,352	10,365	10,421	10,514	10,744	10,936	11,079	11,236	11,983	12,698	13,633
Fine Gael	Philip Jenkinson	9.6	3,185	3,186	3,187	3,190	3,215	3,258	3,296	3,385	3,449	3,557	3,715	3,982	4,395	
Socialist Party	Clare Daly	8.2	2,692	2,692	2,694	2,702	2,705	2,746	2,777	2,809	2,848	2,948	3,041	3,553		
Green	Paul Martin	3.3	1,092	1,092	1,093	1,103	1,108	1,151	1,185	1,236	1,289	1,414	1,511			
Sinn Féin	Paul Donnelly	3.3	1,088	1,088	1,088	1,092	1,093	1,108	1,115	1,119	1,150	1,188	1,209			
Independent	Rena Condrot Ruigrok	2.4	780	781	781	786	790	798	809	821	850	929				
Independent	Ciaran Goulding	2.1	682	682	683	690	698	714	740	763	817					
Christian Solidarity	Angela Keaveney	1.7	565	565	566	573	576	582	598	616						
Progressive Democrats	Finian Fallon	1.6	533	533	533	540	550	557	565							
Independent	Gertie Shields	1.4	452	458	460	464	467	476								
Democratic Left	Joe Holohan	0.7	225	225	225	229	232									
Independent	Elaine Rooney	0.5	176	177	178	179	183									
Ind. Unionist	John McDonald	0.3	107	107	107	112										
Independent	Alan Nagle	0.1	44	44	45											
Independent	Peter Farrelly	0.1	34	34	34											
Independent	Benny Cooney	0.1	18	18	18											
Natural Law	Noel O'Neill	0.1	15	16												
Independent	Jim Tallon	0.1	12													
Electorate: 65,891 Valid: 33,046 Quota: 16,524 Turnout: 50.2%

=== 1997 general election ===
1997 general election: Dublin North
Party	Candidate	FPv%	Count						
Party	Candidate	FPv%	1	2	3	4	5	6	7
Fianna Fáil	Ray Burke	21.6	8,901						
Fianna Fáil	G. V. Wright	17.0	7,007	7,480	7,517	7,851	8,622		
Fine Gael	Nora Owen	14.5	5,956	5,974	6,005	6,196	6,345	6,423	8,302
Labour	Seán Ryan	13.6	5,616	5,658	5,727	5,911	5,993	6,039	7,242
Green	Trevor Sargent	13.6	5,614	5,652	5,750	6,094	6,456	6,671	8,165
Socialist Party	Clare Daly	7.2	2,971	2,997	3,142	3,254	3,300	3,324	
Fine Gael	Philip Jenkinson	4.5	1,857	1,869	1,882	1,962	2,040	2,067	
Progressive Democrats	Finian Fallon	3.5	1,431	1,467	1,486	1,558			
Independent	Annie Ryan	1.6	669	681	715				
Christian Solidarity	Angela Keaveney	1.6	666	669	686				
Independent	Tim O'Brien	0.9	376	380					
Independent	Barbara Mary Hyland	0.1	52	53					
Independent	Paul Coyle	0.1	42	46					
Electorate: 64,030 Valid: 41,158 Spoilt: 364 (0.9%) Quota: 8,232 Turnout: 41,522 (64.9%)

=== 1992 general election ===
1992 general election: Dublin North
Party	Candidate	FPv%	Count							
Party	Candidate	FPv%	1	2	3	4	5	6	7	8
Labour	Seán Ryan	34.0	14,693							
Fianna Fáil	Ray Burke	20.3	8,745							
Fine Gael	Nora Owen	12.4	5,355	6,975	7,004	7,154	7,426	9,227		
Fianna Fáil	G. V. Wright	11.3	4,862	5,406	5,459	5,498	5,649	5,746	7,494	7,599
Green	Trevor Sargent	8.8	3,788	6,298	6,524	6,661	7,110	7,470	8,038	8,524
Fianna Fáil	Marian McGennis	5.0	2,157	2,442	2,504	2,649	2,729	2,822		
Fine Gael	Cathal Boland	4.2	1,818	2,389	2,407	2,489	2,561			
Independent	Betty Carr	1.6	707	968	1,006	1,206				
Independent	Marie Blake	1.5	639	768	815					
Sinn Féin	Martha Ellis	1.0	411	548						
Electorate: 63,341 Valid: 43,175 Spoilt: 540 (1.2%) Quota: 8,636 Turnout: 43,715 (69.0%)

=== 1989 general election ===
1989 general election: Dublin North
Party	Candidate	FPv%	Count					
Party	Candidate	FPv%	1	2	3	4	5	6
Fianna Fáil	Ray Burke	25.5	8,623					
Labour	Seán Ryan	18.0	6,076	6,202	6,360	7,623	7,639	8,190
Fianna Fáil	G. V. Wright	14.5	4,914	4,954	6,545	7,115	7,252	7,548
Fine Gael	John Boland	12.0	4,071	4,319	4,514	4,969	4,977	
Fine Gael	Nora Owen	11.8	3,987	4,416	4,474	5,044	5,051	8,802
Green	Trevor Sargent	8.7	2,953	3,072	3,227			
Fianna Fáil	Sean Gilbride	6.5	2,182	2,207				
Progressive Democrats	Vincent Gaul	3.0	1,011					
Electorate: 50,765 Valid: 33,817 Quota: 8,455 Turnout: 66.6%

=== 1987 general election ===
1987 general election: Dublin North
Party	Candidate	FPv%	Count							
Party	Candidate	FPv%	1	2	3	4	5	6	7	8
Fianna Fáil	Ray Burke	28.1	9,565							
Fine Gael	John Boland	15.9	5,417	5,455	5,456	5,517	5,633	5,843	6,505	9,639
Fianna Fáil	G. V. Wright	12.9	4,402	4,749	4,755	4,841	4,959	7,600	8,363	8,583
Progressive Democrats	Vincent Gaul	11.8	4,008	4,044	4,053	4,143	4,344	4,443	5,125	5,877
Fine Gael	Nora Owen	10.2	3,461	3,475	3,482	3,621	3,756	3,806	4,355	
Fianna Fáil	Seán Gilbride	7.6	2,575	3,129	3,129	3,152	3,285			
Labour	Seán Ryan	6.9	2,350	2,402	2,412	3,055	3,387	3,558		
Labour	Bernard Malone	3.2	1,083	1,095	1,103					
Green	Trevor Sargent	3.2	1,061	1,067	1,119	1,165				
Independent	Barbara Hyland	0.3	96	97						
Electorate: 46,545 Valid: 34,018 Quota: 8,505 Turnout: 73.1%

=== November 1982 general election ===
November 1982 general election: Dublin North
Party	Candidate	FPv%	Count				
Party	Candidate	FPv%	1	2	3	4	5
Fianna Fáil	Ray Burke	27.2	7,610				
Fine Gael	John Boland	24.3	6,808	6,837	6,977	7,094	
Fine Gael	Nora Owen	17.9	5,001	5,019	5,322	5,394	7,237
Fianna Fáil	G. V. Wright	11.7	3,270	3,520	3,595	5,402	5,883
Fianna Fáil	Thomas Caffrey	6.5	1,826	2,125	2,171		
Labour	Seán Ryan	6.4	1,781	1,794	2,906	3,042	
Labour	Bernard Malone	6.0	1,679	1,686			
Electorate: 39,933 Valid: 27,975 Quota: 6,994 Turnout: 70.1%

=== February 1982 general election ===
February 1982 general election: Dublin North
Party	Candidate	FPv%	Count				
Party	Candidate	FPv%	1	2	3	4	5
Fianna Fáil	Ray Burke	29.2	7,922				
Fine Gael	John Boland	21.6	5,873	5,925	6,006	7,749	
Fine Gael	Nora Owen	17.5	4,739	4,772	4,943	6,219	7,062
Labour	Hugh Reilly	14.4	3,911	3,946	4,038		
Fianna Fáil	G. V. Wright	8.8	2,397	2,698			
Fianna Fáil	Patricia McGill	8.5	2,312	3,024	5,342	5,968	6,085
Electorate: 38,117 Valid: 27,154 Spoilt: 235 (0.9%) Quota: 6,789 Turnout: 27,389 (71.9%)

=== 1981 general election ===
1981 general election: Dublin North
Party	Candidate	FPv%	Count				
Party	Candidate	FPv%	1	2	3	4	5
Fianna Fáil	Ray Burke	31.8	8,602				
Fine Gael	John Boland	24.6	6,650	6,768			
Fine Gael	Nora Owen	13.1	3,540	3,596	4,025	4,243	6,175
Fianna Fáil	Joe Fox	9.3	2,506	3,143	3,244	5,337	6,009
Labour	Hugh Reilly	8.5	2,300	2,340	3,719	3,779	
Fianna Fáil	Patrick Dunne	5.4	1,447	2,378	2,466		
Labour	Seán Ryan	4.9	1,334	1,373			
Labour	Joseph Holohan	2.5	683	698			
Electorate: 38,117 Valid: 27,062 Quota: 6,766 Turnout: 71.0%

=== 1933 general election ===
1933 general election: Dublin North
Party	Candidate	FPv%	Count											
Party	Candidate	FPv%	1	2	3	4	5	6	7	8	9	10	11	12
Fianna Fáil	Seán T. O'Kelly	21.6	17,053											
Independent	Alfie Byrne	18.4	14,472											
Cumann na nGaedheal	Richard Mulcahy	11.2	8,864											
Fianna Fáil	Cormac Breathnach	7.5	5,923	7,275	7,366	7,366	7,546	7,991	8,018	9,384				
Fianna Fáil	Oscar Traynor	6.5	5,143	9,404										
Cumann na nGaedheal	Vincent Rice	6.4	5,045	5,068	6,384	6,415	6,417	6,513	7,713	7,747	7,758	7,761	10,207	
Fianna Fáil	Eamonn Cooney	5.9	4,685	6,307	6,402	6,402	6,721	7,869	7,934	9,885				
Labour	Martin O'Sullivan	5.2	4,067	4,374	4,665	4,668	4,680	5,280	5,400	5,559	6,643	7,252	7,593	7,667
Cumann na nGaedheal	Patrick Belton	5.1	3,989	4,011	5,264	5,283	5,284	5,371	6,146	6,154	6,178	6,187	7,902	9,278
Independent	James Larkin	3.5	2,792	2,926	3,075	3,076	3,084							
Fianna Fáil	Matthew Stafford	3.1	2,455	3,003	3,029	3,029	3,151	3,602	3,608					
Cumann na nGaedheal	Margaret Collins-O'Driscoll	3.0	2,379	2,392	3,603	3,638	3,640	3,703	4,758	4,774	4,783	4,789		
Cumann na nGaedheal	John Byrne	2.5	1,940	1,954	3,237	3,255	3,256	3,320						
Electorate: 103,824 Valid: 78,807 Quota: 8,757 Turnout: 75.9%

=== 1932 general election ===
1932 general election: Dublin North
Party	Candidate	FPv%	Count														
Party	Candidate	FPv%	1	2	3	4	5	6	7	8	9	10	11	12	13	14	15
Independent	Alfie Byrne	25.4	18,170														
Cumann na nGaedheal	Richard Mulcahy	13.3	9,477														
Fianna Fáil	Seán T. O'Kelly	12.8	9,176														
Fianna Fáil	Oscar Traynor	11.0	7,850	8,042													
Independent	James Larkin	5.4	3,860	4,091	4,101	4,141	4,156	4,237	4,302	4,316	4,517	4,574	4,806	5,247	5,264		
Fianna Fáil	Cormac Breathnach	4.9	3,491	3,588	3,596	3,884	3,891	3,897	3,935	3,945	4,379	4,413	4,954	5,529	5,547	6,166	6,732
Fianna Fáil	Eamonn Cooney	4.3	3,060	3,105	3,112	3,732	3,748	3,775	3,962	3,970	4,980	5,045	5,284	5,884	5,896	8,568	
Cumann na nGaedheal	Margaret Collins-O'Driscoll	3.8	2,715	5,125	5,671	5,676	5,680	5,682	5,752	6,121	6,166	6,958	7,640	8,179			
Cumann na nGaedheal	John Byrne	3.0	2,113	4,461	4,696	4,699	4,704	4,706	4,767	5,205	5,241	5,993	6,663	7,201	7,300	7,556	7,593
Labour	Martin O'Sullivan	2.9	2,064	2,309	2,344	2,369	2,375	2,383	3,455	3,506	3,564	3,766	4,075				
Independent	Patrick Belton	2.8	2,016	2,943	2,999	3,012	3,023	3,031	3,127	3,217	3,276	3,499					
Cumann na nGaedheal	Vincent Rice	2.6	1,865	3,264	3,544	3,550	3,558	3,566	3,592	4,079	4,111	5,063	5,514	6,120	6,212	6,462	6,486
Fianna Fáil	Oscar Kirwan	2.3	1,650	1,716	1,721	1,922	1,930	1,944	2,002	2,015							
Cumann na nGaedheal	Sylvester O'Farrell	2.2	1,575	2,605	2,760	2,767	2,774	2,782	2,845	3,215	3,252						
Labour	Denis Cullen	1.9	1,380	1,762	1,779	1,794	1,802	1,808									
Cumann na nGaedheal	Patrick Leonard	1.2	830	1,675	1,857	1,860	1,862	1,865	1,907								
Independent	Joseph Troy	0.2	170	182	182	191	195										
Electorate: 99,894 Valid: 71,462 Quota: 7,941 Turnout: 71.5%

=== 1929 by-election ===
Following the election of independent TD Alfie Byrne to Seanad Éireann, a by-election was held on 14 March 1929. The seat was won by the Cumann na nGaedheal candidate Thomas F. O'Higgins.

1929 by-election: Dublin North
Party	Candidate	FPv%	Count
Party	Candidate	FPv%	1
Cumann na nGaedheal	Thomas F. O'Higgins	50.1	28,445
Fianna Fáil	Oscar Traynor	49.9	28,294
Electorate: 96,748 Valid: 56,739 Quota: 28,370 Turnout: 58.7%

=== 1928 by-election ===
Following the disqualification of Irish Worker League TD James Larkin due to bankruptcy, a by-election was held on 3 April 1928. The seat was won by the Cumann na nGaedheal candidate Vincent Rice.

1928 by-election: Dublin North
Party	Candidate	FPv%	Count
Party	Candidate	FPv%	1
Cumann na nGaedheal	Vincent Rice	50.2	21,731
Fianna Fáil	Kathleen Clarke	30.8	13,322
Irish Worker League	James Larkin	19.0	8,232
Electorate: 94,390 Valid: 43,285 Quota: 21,643 Turnout: 45.9%

=== September 1927 general election ===
September 1927 general election: Dublin North
Party	Candidate	FPv%	Count											
Party	Candidate	FPv%	1	2	3	4	5	6	7	8	9	10	11	12
Cumann na nGaedheal	Richard Mulcahy	22.4	14,597											
Independent	Alfie Byrne	18.2	11,864											
Irish Worker League	James Larkin	11.5	7,490											
Fianna Fáil	Seán T. O'Kelly	10.7	6,958	6,988	7,062	7,099	7,150	7,191	7,313					
Fianna Fáil	Kathleen Clarke	5.7	3,694	3,716	3,959	3,992	4,020	4,050	4,157	4,160	4,975	5,010	5,458	6,118
Fianna Fáil	Eamonn Cooney	5.3	3,477	3,500	3,686	3,732	3,751	3,780	3,867	3,889	5,296	5,351	5,847	6,540
Cumann na nGaedheal	John Byrne	4.5	2,935	4,610	5,801	5,803	5,811	5,941	6,032	6,032	6,059	6,663	6,860	7,468
Fianna Fáil	Padraic Fleming	3.7	2,391	2,415	2,499	2,525	2,547	2,570	2,651	2,663				
Cumann na nGaedheal	Margaret Collins-O'Driscoll	3.5	2,274	4,736	5,493	5,495	5,517	5,672	5,785	5,786	5,811	6,370	6,575	7,146
Cumann na nGaedheal	Patrick Leonard	3.2	2,068	3,771	4,329	4,332	4,346	4,507	4,605	4,605	4,645	5,631	5,857	6,658
Labour	Denis Cullen	3.1	2,044	2,120	2,393	2,403	2,816	2,894	3,001	3,005	3,126	3,188		
Independent	Laurence O'Neill	2.7	1,755	1,985	2,646	2,662	2,765	2,879	3,122	3,139	3,269	3,616	4,668	
Cumann na nGaedheal	William O'Hara	2.6	1,705	2,233	2,448	2,450	2,463	2,695	2,766	2,767	2,804			
Independent	William Larkin	1.3	832	915	1,141	1,162	1,187	1,233						
Labour	Thomas O'Reilly	1.0	665	694	745	749								
National League	Thomas O'Driscoll	0.7	453	920	1,020	1,063	1,069							
Electorate: 94,370 Valid: 65,202 Quota: 7,245 Turnout: 69.1%

=== June 1927 general election ===
June 1927 general election: Dublin North
Party	Candidate	FPv%	Count														
Party	Candidate	FPv%	1	2	3	4	5	6	7	8	9	10	11	12	13	14	15
Independent	Alfie Byrne	28.0	17,780														
Cumann na nGaedheal	Richard Mulcahy	18.5	11,726														
Fianna Fáil	Seán T. O'Kelly	9.5	6,040	6,286	6,313	6,336	6,399	6,419	7,064								
Sinn Féin	Oscar Traynor	6.8	4,351	4,804	4,823	4,848	4,927	4,953	5,057	5,058	5,131	5,173	5,491	5,591	6,399	6,968	7,437
Fianna Fáil	Kathleen Clarke	6.0	3,818	4,684	4,704	4,727	4,796	4,814	5,071	5,072	5,114	5,146	5,316	5,364	7,729		
Fianna Fáil	Eamonn Cooney	4.6	2,940	3,388	3,404	3,414	3,442	3,457	3,751	3,752	3,800	3,822	3,959	4,022			
Cumann na nGaedheal	John Byrne	3.6	2,267	3,590	4,332	4,357	4,422	4,489	4,505	4,505	4,562	5,010	5,172	5,318	5,389	5,405	6,374
Cumann na nGaedheal	Margaret Collins-O'Driscoll	3.2	2,053	3,212	4,925	4,965	5,045	5,116	5,137	5,137	5,205	5,566	5,770	5,920	5,979	5,984	6,460
National League	Coghlan Briscoe	2.9	1,837	3,078	3,141	3,148	3,247	3,846	3,862	3,862	3,923	4,007	4,296	4,455	4,539	4,568	
Labour	Denis Cullen	2.7	1,692	2,649	2,718	2,739	2,836	2,886	2,920	2,920	3,432	3,489	3,752	5,545	5,786	5,829	6,720
Cumann na nGaedheal	Patrick Leonard	2.6	1,679	2,370	3,565	3,580	3,666	3,773	3,794	3,794	3,864	4,498	4,728	4,930	4,990	4,996	5,556
Fianna Fáil	Conn Murphy	2.1	1,345	1,469	1,498	1,504	1,532	1,545									
Labour	Ronald Mortished	1.9	1,237	1,710	1,820	1,847	1,964	2,035	2,057	2,057	2,684	2,745	2,990				
Labour	Edward O'Carroll	1.9	1,219	1,507	1,570	1,581	1,645	1,686	1,723	1,723							
Independent	William Larkin	1.6	1,012	1,950	2,022	2,040	2,191	2,268	2,302	2,302	2,359	2,450					
Cumann na nGaedheal	John Donnelly	1.4	890	1,362	1,777	1,793	1,847	1,911	1,923	1,923	1,953						
National League	B. C. Hackett	1.4	860	1,234	1,272	1,277	1,324										
Independent	John P. Neary	0.9	565	1,166	1,220	1,245											
Clann Éireann	Lillie O'Shea Leamy	0.4	234	299	319												
Electorate: 94,370 Valid: 63,545 Quota: 7,061 Turnout: 67.3%

=== 1925 by-election ===
Following the resignations of Cumann na nGaedheal TDs Francis Cahill and Seán McGarry, a by-election for both seats was held on 11 March 1925. The first seat was won by the Cumann na nGaedheal candidate Patrick Leonard, and the second by the Republican candidate Oscar Traynor.

1925 by-election: Dublin North
Party	Candidate	FPv%	Count			
Party	Candidate	FPv%	1	2	3	4
Cumann na nGaedheal	Patrick Leonard	34.8	17,329			
Republican	Oscar Traynor	31.3	15,598	15,603	15,888	16,360
Labour	Denis Cullen	16.9	8,422	8,466	9,195	13,957
Cumann na nGaedheal	Donal O'Connor	12.6	6,294	6,938	7,798	
Independent	Seán Milroy	4.4	2,188	2,213		
Electorate: 90,280 Valid: 49,831 Quota: 16,611 Turnout: 55.2%

=== 1923 general election ===
1923 general election: Dublin North
Party	Candidate	FPv%	Count													
Party	Candidate	FPv%	1	2	3	4	5	6	7	8	9	10	11	12	13	14
Cumann na nGaedheal	Richard Mulcahy	39.8	22,005													
Independent	Alfie Byrne	19.0	10,518													
Republican	Ernie O'Malley	8.3	4,602	4,649	4,729	4,734	4,742	4,794	4,817	4,848	5,021	5,058	5,080	5,118	5,373	5,410
Republican	Seán T. O'Kelly	7.7	4,233	4,261	4,323	4,329	4,335	4,387	4,413	4,462	5,170	5,190	5,212	5,246	5,636	5,699
Businessmen's Party	William Hewat	4.7	2,594	3,105	3,552	3,688	3,771	3,772	3,928	3,954	3,960	4,012	5,218	5,372	5,676	5,992
Dublin Trades Council	P. T. Daly	3.8	2,075	2,260	2,768	2,815	2,861	2,868	2,907	3,296	3,318	3,354	3,504	3,620	4,165	4,337
Labour	Edward O'Carroll	3.0	1,653	2,051	2,396	2,481	2,539	2,551	2,621	2,718	2,743	2,780	2,879	3,068		
Cumann na nGaedheal	Seán McGarry	2.5	1,397	10,125												
Cumann na nGaedheal	Margaret Collins-O'Driscoll	2.3	1,247	4,939	6,022	8,015										
Independent	James Clark	1.9	1,047	1,260	1,672	1,730	1,778	1,781	1,881	1,900	1,910	1,954				
Cumann na nGaedheal	Francis Cahill	1.4	790	1,380	2,112	2,496	3,009	3,015	3,079	3,122	3,129	3,398	3,556	4,244	4,681	7,151
Cumann na nGaedheal	Patrick McIntyre	1.3	742	1,282	1,390	1,704	1,962	1,966	2,008	2,076	2,084	2,343	2,392			
Republican	Henry O'Hanrahan	1.1	636	661	711	716	719	943	961	1,006						
Dublin Trades Council	John Lawlor	1.0	573	675	854	880	902	902	937							
Independent	Kevin Kenny	0.7	371	505	670	731	770	774								
Cumann na nGaedheal	Séamus Hughes	0.7	365	777	883	1,448	1,875	1,880	1,948	1,979	1,982	2,321	2,396	3,300	3,768	
Republican	Daithí O'Donoghue	0.6	330	353	376	383	391									
Cumann na nGaedheal	James Whelan	0.3	142	372	443	729	1,078	1,082	1,136	1,163	1,176					
Electorate: 89,909 Valid: 55,320 Quota: 6,147 Turnout: 61.5%

== See also ==
- Dáil constituencies
- Politics of the Republic of Ireland
- Historic Dáil constituencies
- Elections in the Republic of Ireland
