= Philip Shanahan =

Irish politician (1874–1931)

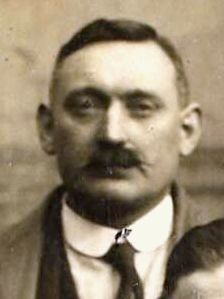
- Shanahan in 1919

Teachta Dála
- In office May 1921 – June 1922
- Constituency: Dublin Mid
- In office December 1918 – May 1921
- Constituency: Dublin Harbour

Personal details
- Born: 27 October 1874 County Tipperary, Ireland
- Died: 21 November 1931 (aged 57) County Tipperary, Ireland
- Party: Sinn Féin

British Army intelligence file for Philip Shanahan

Philip Shanahan (27 October 1874 – 21 November 1931) was an Irish Sinn Féin politician, who was elected to the United Kingdom House of Commons in 1918 and served as a Teachta Dála (TD) in Dáil Éireann from 1919 to 1922.

He lived in Dublin, where he was a licensed vintner, maintaining an Irish pub in the notorious Monto red light district.

He was involved in the Easter Rising in Dublin in 1916. This led to him having legal difficulties over the licence of his public house. Shanahan consulted the lawyer and politician Tim Healy who commented:

"I had with me to-day a solicitor with his client, a Dublin publican named Phil Shanahan, whose licence is being opposed, and whose house was closed by the military because he was in Jacob's during Easter week. I was astonished at the type of man - about 40 years of age, jolly and respectable. He said he "rose out" to have a "crack at the English" and seemed not at all concerned at the question of success or failure. He was a Tipperary hurler in the old days. For such a man to join the Rebellion and sacrifice the splendid trade he enjoyed makes one think there are disinterested Nationalists to be found. I thought a publican was the last man in the world to join a rising! Alfred Byrne, M.P., was with him, and is bitter against the Party. I think I can save Shanahan's property."

He was elected for Dublin Harbour at the 1918 general election, defeating Alfie Byrne. Like other Sinn Féin MPs he did not take his seat at Westminster, but became a member of the revolutionary Dáil. He represented Dublin Harbour in the First Dáil from 1919 to 1921. He was arrested and detained in custody by the British government in April 1920 but was released in time to attend the next meeting of the Dáil on 29 June 1920.

During the war of independence, Billy Dunleavy recalls, "The IRA were the best men we ever had at that time. The Tans used to go around in the tenders with a wire over the top and if it was going by up there in Talbot Street they'd (IRA) say, 'Get out of the way, quick!' and they'd throw a hand grenade into the car. Now Phil Shanahan, he owned a pub over there on the corner, he was a great man and he used to hide them after they'd been out on a job. He had cellars and all the IRA men used to go there and hide their stuff."

In 1921 a general election was held for the House of Commons of Southern Ireland. Republicans used this as an election for the Second Dáil. Shanahan was elected unopposed for the four-seat Dublin Mid constituency. He was defeated at the 1922 general election to the 3rd Dáil, as a member of the Anti-Treaty faction of Sinn Féin (which opposed the creation of the Irish Free State in the place of the Republic declared in 1919).

He left Dublin in 1928 and returned to his home village of Hollyford, County Tipperary. He died on 21 November 1931, aged 57.

== Sources ==
- Who's Who of British Members of Parliament: Vol. III 1919-1945, edited by M. Stenton & S. Lees (The Harvester Press 1979)
- Parliamentary Election Results in Ireland 1801-1922, edited by B.M. Walker (Royal Irish Academy 1978)

Parliament of the United Kingdom
Preceded by Alfie Byrne	Member of Parliament for Dublin Harbour; 1918–1922	Constituency abolished
Oireachtas
New constituency	Teachta Dála for Dublin Harbour; 1918–1921	Constituency abolished

Dáil	Election	Deputy (Party)	Deputy (Party)	Deputy (Party)	Deputy (Party)
2nd	1921	Seán McGarry (SF)	Seán T. O'Kelly (SF)	Philip Shanahan (SF)	Kathleen Clarke (SF)
3rd	1922	Seán McGarry (PT-SF)	Seán T. O'Kelly (AT-SF)	Alfie Byrne (Ind.)	Laurence O'Neill (Ind.)
4th	1923	Constituency abolished. See Dublin North			
