= Eamonn Cooney =

Irish politician (died 1975)

Teachta Dála
- In office June 1938 – June 1943
- Constituency: Dublin North-West
- In office September 1927 – July 1937
- Constituency: Dublin North

Personal details
- Born: 1895
- Died: 7 February 1975 (aged 79–80) Dublin, Ireland
- Party: Fianna Fáil
- Occupation: Publican

Military service
- Branch/service: Irish Volunteers; Irish Republican Army
- Rank: Staff Captain
- Unit: General Headquarters (GHQ) (until 1922); K Company, 1 Battalion, Dublin Brigade (from 1922)

Eamonn Cooney (1895 – 7 February 1975) was an Irish revolutionary, politician and trade union official with the Irish National Union of Vintners', Grocers' and Allied Trades Assistants.

== Revolutionary period ==
Cooney claimed membership of the Irish Volunteers in Belfast from 1914. During the Irish War of Independence (1919–1921), he was appointed a staff captain in the Irish Republican Army (IRA) general headquarters and was involved in intelligence work, raids and the defence of nationalist areas in Belfast. Cooney was arrested by British forces in November 1920 and held in Ballykinlar Internment Camp, County Down until 8 December 1921. Moving to Dublin in March 1922, he transferred to K Company, 1 Battalion, Dublin Brigade, IRA and used his position in the Grocers’ Assistants Union to give the IRA access to the union's Banba Hall, Parnell Square.

Taking the anti-Treaty side in the Irish Civil War, Cooney took part in the occupation and defence of several buildings around Parnell Square and Bolton Street against National forces. He was arrested in December 1922 and interned until April 1923. Cooney was later awarded a pension by the Irish government under the Military Service Pensions Act, 1934 for service with the Irish Volunteers and the IRA between 1917 and 1923.

== Politics ==
He was first elected to Dáil Éireann as a Fianna Fáil Teachta Dála (TD) for the Dublin North constituency at the September 1927 general election. He was re-elected at the 1932 and 1933 general elections. He lost his seat at the 1937 general election but was re-elected for the Dublin North-West constituency at the 1938 general election. He did not contest the 1943 general election, but was an unsuccessful candidate at the 1944 general election.

Dáil	Election	Deputy (Party)	Deputy (Party)	Deputy (Party)	Deputy (Party)	Deputy (Party)	Deputy (Party)	Deputy (Party)	Deputy (Party)
4th	1923	Alfie Byrne (Ind.)	Francis Cahill (CnaG)	Margaret Collins-O'Driscoll (CnaG)	Seán McGarry (CnaG)	William Hewat (BP)	Richard Mulcahy (CnaG)	Seán T. O'Kelly (Rep)	Ernie O'Malley (Rep)
4th	1925 by-election	Alfie Byrne (Ind.)	Patrick Leonard (CnaG)	Margaret Collins-O'Driscoll (CnaG)	Oscar Traynor (Rep)	William Hewat (BP)	Richard Mulcahy (CnaG)	Seán T. O'Kelly (Rep)	Ernie O'Malley (Rep)
5th	1927 (Jun)	Alfie Byrne (Ind.)	John Byrne (CnaG)	Margaret Collins-O'Driscoll (CnaG)	Oscar Traynor (SF)	Denis Cullen (Lab)	Richard Mulcahy (CnaG)	Seán T. O'Kelly (FF)	Kathleen Clarke (FF)
6th	1927 (Sep)	Alfie Byrne (Ind.)	John Byrne (CnaG)	Margaret Collins-O'Driscoll (CnaG)	Patrick Leonard (CnaG)	James Larkin (IWL)	Richard Mulcahy (CnaG)	Seán T. O'Kelly (FF)	Eamonn Cooney (FF)
6th	1928 by-election	Alfie Byrne (Ind.)	John Byrne (CnaG)	Margaret Collins-O'Driscoll (CnaG)	Patrick Leonard (CnaG)	Vincent Rice (CnaG)	Richard Mulcahy (CnaG)	Seán T. O'Kelly (FF)	Eamonn Cooney (FF)
6th	1929 by-election	Thomas F. O'Higgins (CnaG)	John Byrne (CnaG)	Margaret Collins-O'Driscoll (CnaG)	Patrick Leonard (CnaG)	Vincent Rice (CnaG)	Richard Mulcahy (CnaG)	Seán T. O'Kelly (FF)	Eamonn Cooney (FF)
7th	1932	Alfie Byrne (Ind.)	John Byrne (CnaG)	Margaret Collins-O'Driscoll (CnaG)	Oscar Traynor (FF)	Cormac Breathnach (FF)	Richard Mulcahy (CnaG)	Seán T. O'Kelly (FF)	Eamonn Cooney (FF)
8th	1933	Alfie Byrne (Ind.)	Patrick Belton (CnaG)	Vincent Rice (CnaG)	Oscar Traynor (FF)	Cormac Breathnach (FF)	Richard Mulcahy (CnaG)	Seán T. O'Kelly (FF)	Eamonn Cooney (FF)
9th	1937	Constituency abolished. See Dublin North-East and Dublin North-West							

Dáil	Election	Deputy (Party)	Deputy (Party)	Deputy (Party)	Deputy (Party)
22nd	1981	Ray Burke (FF)	John Boland (FG)	Nora Owen (FG)	3 seats 1981–1992
23rd	1982 (Feb)	Ray Burke (FF)	John Boland (FG)	Nora Owen (FG)	3 seats 1981–1992
24th	1982 (Nov)	Ray Burke (FF)	John Boland (FG)	Nora Owen (FG)	3 seats 1981–1992
25th	1987	Ray Burke (FF)	John Boland (FG)	G. V. Wright (FF)	3 seats 1981–1992
26th	1989	Ray Burke (FF)	Nora Owen (FG)	Seán Ryan (Lab)	3 seats 1981–1992
27th	1992	Ray Burke (FF)	Nora Owen (FG)	Seán Ryan (Lab)	Trevor Sargent (GP)
28th	1997	Ray Burke (FF)	Nora Owen (FG)	G. V. Wright (FF)	Trevor Sargent (GP)
28th	1998 by-election	Seán Ryan (Lab)	Nora Owen (FG)	G. V. Wright (FF)	Trevor Sargent (GP)
29th	2002	Seán Ryan (Lab)	Jim Glennon (FF)	G. V. Wright (FF)	Trevor Sargent (GP)
30th	2007	James Reilly (FG)	Michael Kennedy (FF)	Darragh O'Brien (FF)	Trevor Sargent (GP)
31st	2011	James Reilly (FG)	Alan Farrell (FG)	Brendan Ryan (Lab)	Clare Daly (SP)
32nd	2016	Constituency abolished. See Dublin Fingal			

Dáil	Election	Deputy (Party)	Deputy (Party)	Deputy (Party)	Deputy (Party)
2nd	1921	Philip Cosgrave (SF)	Joseph McGrath (SF)	Richard Mulcahy (SF)	Michael Staines (SF)
3rd	1922	Philip Cosgrave (PT-SF)	Joseph McGrath (PT-SF)	Richard Mulcahy (PT-SF)	Michael Staines (PT-SF)
4th	1923	Constituency abolished. See Dublin North			

Dáil	Election	Deputy (Party)	Deputy (Party)	Deputy (Party)	Deputy (Party)	Deputy (Party)
9th	1937	Seán T. O'Kelly (FF)	A. P. Byrne (Ind.)	Cormac Breathnach (FF)	Patrick McGilligan (FG)	Archie Heron (Lab)
10th	1938	Seán T. O'Kelly (FF)	A. P. Byrne (Ind.)	Cormac Breathnach (FF)	Patrick McGilligan (FG)	Eamonn Cooney (FF)
11th	1943	Seán T. O'Kelly (FF)	A. P. Byrne (Ind.)	Cormac Breathnach (FF)	Patrick McGilligan (FG)	Martin O'Sullivan (Lab)
12th	1944	Seán T. O'Kelly (FF)	John S. O'Connor (FF)	Cormac Breathnach (FF)	Patrick McGilligan (FG)	Martin O'Sullivan (Lab)
12th	1945 by-election	Vivion de Valera (FF)	John S. O'Connor (FF)	Cormac Breathnach (FF)	Patrick McGilligan (FG)	Martin O'Sullivan (Lab)
13th	1948	Mick Fitzpatrick (CnaP)	A. P. Byrne (Ind.)	Cormac Breathnach (FF)	3 seats from 1948 to 1969	
14th	1951	Declan Costello (FG)	A. P. Byrne (Ind.)	Cormac Breathnach (FF)	3 seats from 1948 to 1969	
14th	1952 by-election	Declan Costello (FG)	Thomas Byrne (Ind.)	Cormac Breathnach (FF)	3 seats from 1948 to 1969	
15th	1954	Declan Costello (FG)	Thomas Byrne (Ind.)	Richard Gogan (FF)	3 seats from 1948 to 1969	
16th	1957	Declan Costello (FG)	Thomas Byrne (Ind.)	Richard Gogan (FF)	3 seats from 1948 to 1969	
17th	1961	Declan Costello (FG)	Michael Mullen (Lab)	Richard Gogan (FF)	3 seats from 1948 to 1969	
18th	1965	Declan Costello (FG)	Michael Mullen (Lab)	Richard Gogan (FF)	3 seats from 1948 to 1969	
19th	1969	Hugh Byrne (FG)	Jim Tunney (FF)	Richard Gogan (FF)	David Thornley (Lab)	4 seats from 1969 to 1977
20th	1973	Hugh Byrne (FG)	Jim Tunney (FF)	Richard Gogan (FF)	David Thornley (Lab)	4 seats from 1969 to 1977
21st	1977	Constituency abolished. See Dublin Finglas and Dublin Cabra				

Dáil	Election	Deputy (Party)	Deputy (Party)	Deputy (Party)	Deputy (Party)
22nd	1981	Jim Tunney (FF)	Michael Barrett (FF)	Mary Flaherty (FG)	Hugh Byrne (FG)
23rd	1982 (Feb)	Jim Tunney (FF)	Michael Barrett (FF)	Mary Flaherty (FG)	Proinsias De Rossa (WP)
24th	1982 (Nov)	Jim Tunney (FF)	Michael Barrett (FF)	Mary Flaherty (FG)	Proinsias De Rossa (WP)
25th	1987	Jim Tunney (FF)	Michael Barrett (FF)	Mary Flaherty (FG)	Proinsias De Rossa (WP)
26th	1989	Jim Tunney (FF)	Michael Barrett (FF)	Mary Flaherty (FG)	Proinsias De Rossa (WP)
27th	1992	Noel Ahern (FF)	Róisín Shortall (Lab)	Mary Flaherty (FG)	Proinsias De Rossa (DL)
28th	1997	Noel Ahern (FF)	Róisín Shortall (Lab)	Pat Carey (FF)	Proinsias De Rossa (DL)
29th	2002	Noel Ahern (FF)	Róisín Shortall (Lab)	Pat Carey (FF)	3 seats from 2002
30th	2007	Noel Ahern (FF)	Róisín Shortall (Lab)	Pat Carey (FF)	3 seats from 2002
31st	2011	Dessie Ellis (SF)	Róisín Shortall (Lab)	John Lyons (Lab)	3 seats from 2002
32nd	2016	Dessie Ellis (SF)	Róisín Shortall (SD)	Noel Rock (FG)	3 seats from 2002
33rd	2020	Dessie Ellis (SF)	Róisín Shortall (SD)	Paul McAuliffe (FF)	3 seats from 2002
34th	2024	Dessie Ellis (SF)	Rory Hearne (SD)	Paul McAuliffe (FF)	3 seats from 2002
