= National Group =

Political party in the Irish Free State, 1924 to 1925

- Founder: Joseph McGrath
- Founded: 1924
- Dissolved: 1925
- Split from: Cumann na nGaedheal
- Ideology: Irish republicanism

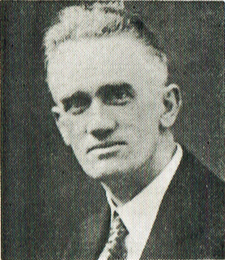
Francis Cahill

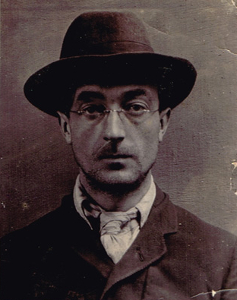
Seán McGarry

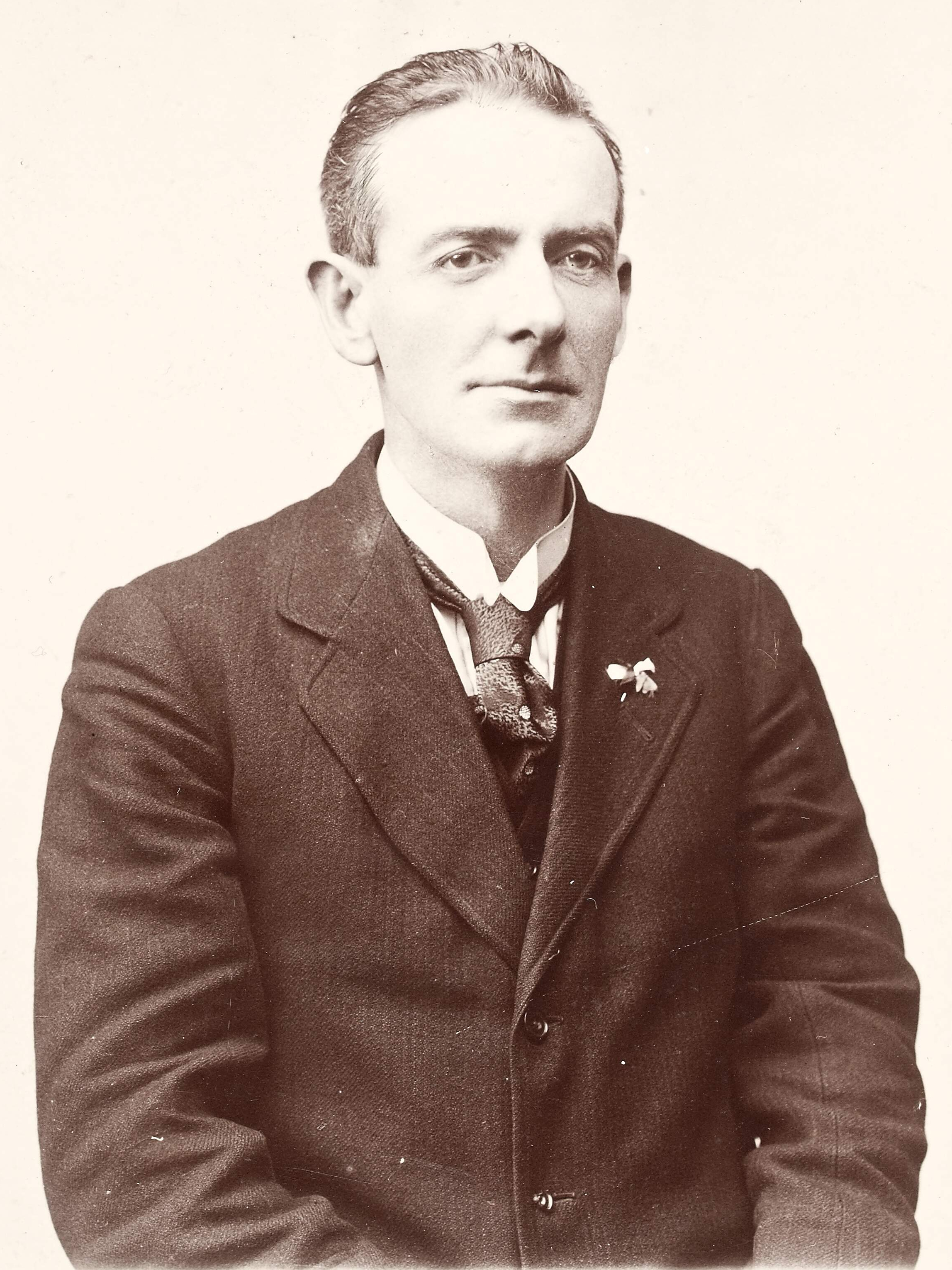
Seán Milroy

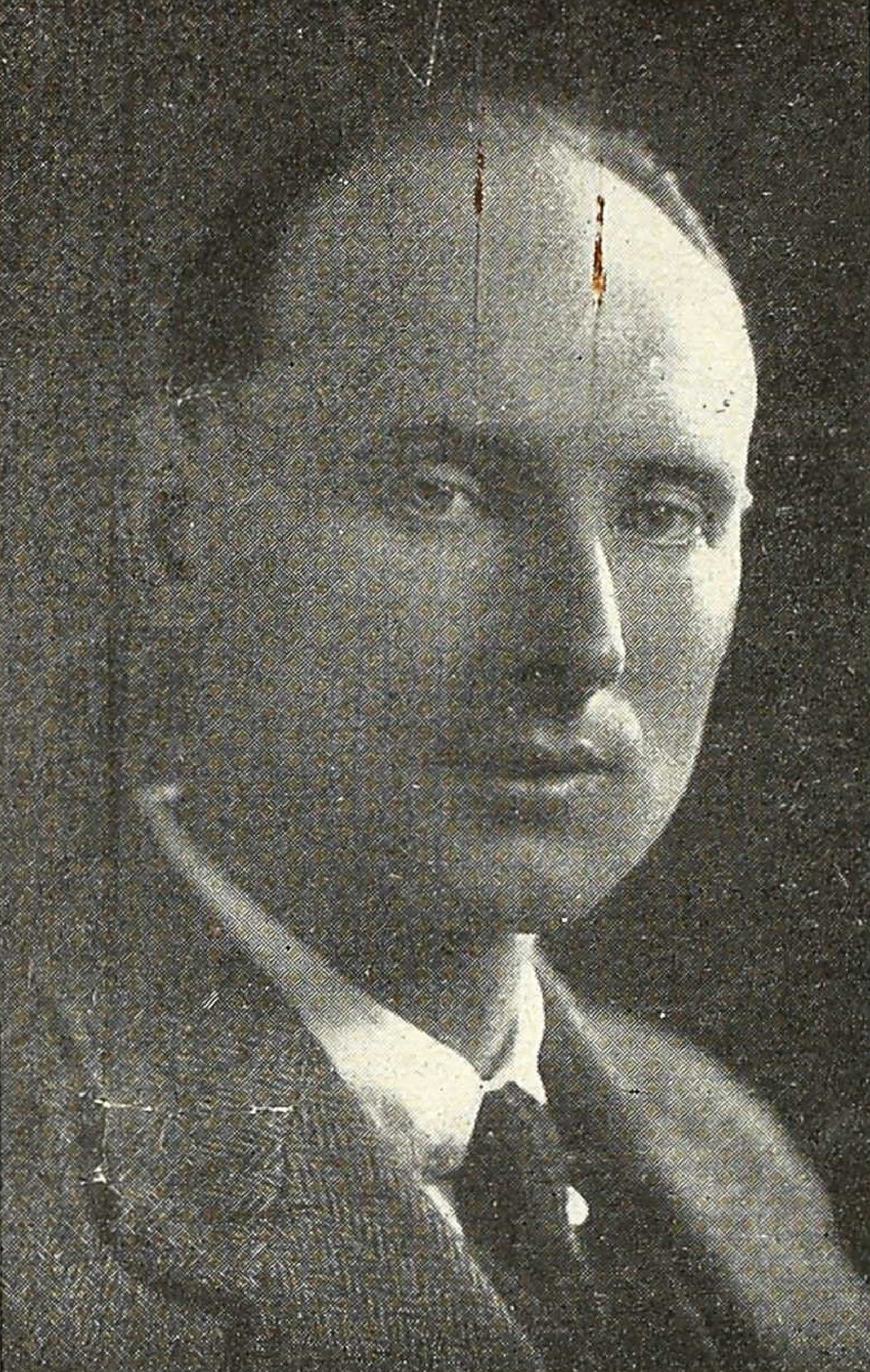
Alexander McCabe

Cahill, McGarry, Milroy and McCabe were among the TDs who resigned from their seats in protest.

The National Group was a minor political party in the Irish Free State between 1924 and 1925.

On 11 March, Joseph McGrath resigned as Minister for Industry and Commerce because of his support for the Irish Republican Army Organisation in the Army Mutiny, the last military challenge to civilian authority in Ireland. Later that month, McGrath and eight other Cumann na nGaedheal TDs left the party: Francis Cahill, Thomas Carter, Henry Finlay, Seán Gibbons, Alexander McCabe, Daniel McCarthy, Seán McGarry, and Seán Milroy. McCartgy had been serving as the Government Chief Whip.

They initially constituted as Constitutional Republicans or Independent Republicans. In May 1924, McGrath and McCarthy issued a statement in which they stated that the organisation was to be called the National Group which go into opposition. The criticism of the government cited included the "Army trouble", the lack of sound economic policy, and the delay in establishing the Boundary Commission to consider the partition of Ireland.

Osmond Esmonde also left Cumann na nGaedheal to join the National Group in June 1924.

On 29 October 1924, McGrath resigned from the Dáil. He was followed by the eight initial members of the National Group; Esmonde did not resign.

The March 1925 Dáil by-elections were held to fill the vacancies, described as a "mini-general election", and as a test of public opinion and sympathy with the mutiny. Seán Milroy, who had resigned from his seat in Cavan, contested the by-election in Dublin North; he was the only one of the resigned TDs who sought re-election. These saw the only time that by-elections to fill two vacancies in the same constituency occurred in Ireland, with Dublin North and Leitrim–Sligo electing two TDs. Seven of the seats were won by Cumann na nGaedheal; the other two were won by the abstentionist candidates of Sinn Féin, led by Éamon de Valera.
