= John Byrne (Irish politician) =

Irish politician (1878–1942

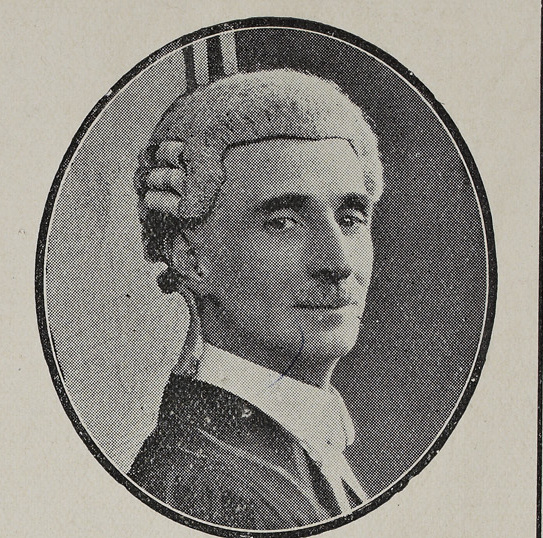
- Byrne in 1933

Teachta Dála
- In office June 1927 – January 1933
- Constituency: Dublin North

Personal details
- Born: 23 September 1878 Dublin, Ireland
- Died: 29 July 1942 (aged 63) Dublin, Ireland
- Party: Cumann na nGaedheal

John Joseph Byrne (23 September 1878 – 29 July 1942) was an Irish politician and barrister. He was first elected to Dáil Éireann as a Cumann na nGaedheal Teachta Dála (TD) for the Dublin North constituency at the June 1927 general election.

He was re-elected at the September 1927 and 1932 general elections. He lost his seat at the 1933 general election. He was an unsuccessful candidate at the 1937 general election.

| Dáil | Election | Deputy (Party) | Deputy (Party) | Deputy (Party) | Deputy (Party) | Deputy (Party) | Deputy (Party) | Deputy (Party) | Deputy (Party) |
|---|---|---|---|---|---|---|---|---|---|
| 4th | 1923 | Alfie Byrne (Ind.) | Francis Cahill (CnaG) | Margaret Collins-O'Driscoll (CnaG) | Seán McGarry (CnaG) | William Hewat (BP) | Richard Mulcahy (CnaG) | Seán T. O'Kelly (Rep) | Ernie O'Malley (Rep) |
| 4th | 1925 by-election | Alfie Byrne (Ind.) | Patrick Leonard (CnaG) | Margaret Collins-O'Driscoll (CnaG) | Oscar Traynor (Rep) | William Hewat (BP) | Richard Mulcahy (CnaG) | Seán T. O'Kelly (Rep) | Ernie O'Malley (Rep) |
| 5th | 1927 (Jun) | Alfie Byrne (Ind.) | John Byrne (CnaG) | Margaret Collins-O'Driscoll (CnaG) | Oscar Traynor (SF) | Denis Cullen (Lab) | Richard Mulcahy (CnaG) | Seán T. O'Kelly (FF) | Kathleen Clarke (FF) |
| 6th | 1927 (Sep) | Alfie Byrne (Ind.) | John Byrne (CnaG) | Margaret Collins-O'Driscoll (CnaG) | Patrick Leonard (CnaG) | James Larkin (IWL) | Richard Mulcahy (CnaG) | Seán T. O'Kelly (FF) | Eamonn Cooney (FF) |
| 6th | 1928 by-election | Alfie Byrne (Ind.) | John Byrne (CnaG) | Margaret Collins-O'Driscoll (CnaG) | Patrick Leonard (CnaG) | Vincent Rice (CnaG) | Richard Mulcahy (CnaG) | Seán T. O'Kelly (FF) | Eamonn Cooney (FF) |
| 6th | 1929 by-election | Thomas F. O'Higgins (CnaG) | John Byrne (CnaG) | Margaret Collins-O'Driscoll (CnaG) | Patrick Leonard (CnaG) | Vincent Rice (CnaG) | Richard Mulcahy (CnaG) | Seán T. O'Kelly (FF) | Eamonn Cooney (FF) |
| 7th | 1932 | Alfie Byrne (Ind.) | John Byrne (CnaG) | Margaret Collins-O'Driscoll (CnaG) | Oscar Traynor (FF) | Cormac Breathnach (FF) | Richard Mulcahy (CnaG) | Seán T. O'Kelly (FF) | Eamonn Cooney (FF) |
| 8th | 1933 | Alfie Byrne (Ind.) | Patrick Belton (CnaG) | Vincent Rice (CnaG) | Oscar Traynor (FF) | Cormac Breathnach (FF) | Richard Mulcahy (CnaG) | Seán T. O'Kelly (FF) | Eamonn Cooney (FF) |
| 9th | 1937 | Constituency abolished. See Dublin North-East and Dublin North-West | | | | | | | |

| Dáil | Election | Deputy (Party) | Deputy (Party) | Deputy (Party) | Deputy (Party) |
|---|---|---|---|---|---|
| 22nd | 1981 | Ray Burke (FF) | John Boland (FG) | Nora Owen (FG) | 3 seats 1981–1992 |
| 23rd | 1982 (Feb) | Ray Burke (FF) | John Boland (FG) | Nora Owen (FG) | 3 seats 1981–1992 |
| 24th | 1982 (Nov) | Ray Burke (FF) | John Boland (FG) | Nora Owen (FG) | 3 seats 1981–1992 |
| 25th | 1987 | Ray Burke (FF) | John Boland (FG) | G. V. Wright (FF) | 3 seats 1981–1992 |
| 26th | 1989 | Ray Burke (FF) | Nora Owen (FG) | Seán Ryan (Lab) | 3 seats 1981–1992 |
| 27th | 1992 | Ray Burke (FF) | Nora Owen (FG) | Seán Ryan (Lab) | Trevor Sargent (GP) |
| 28th | 1997 | Ray Burke (FF) | Nora Owen (FG) | G. V. Wright (FF) | Trevor Sargent (GP) |
| 28th | 1998 by-election | Seán Ryan (Lab) | Nora Owen (FG) | G. V. Wright (FF) | Trevor Sargent (GP) |
| 29th | 2002 | Seán Ryan (Lab) | Jim Glennon (FF) | G. V. Wright (FF) | Trevor Sargent (GP) |
| 30th | 2007 | James Reilly (FG) | Michael Kennedy (FF) | Darragh O'Brien (FF) | Trevor Sargent (GP) |
| 31st | 2011 | James Reilly (FG) | Alan Farrell (FG) | Brendan Ryan (Lab) | Clare Daly (SP) |
| 32nd | 2016 | Constituency abolished. See Dublin Fingal | | | |
