= Laurence O'Neill =

Irish politician (1864–1943)

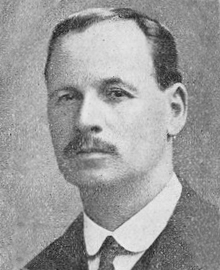
- O'Neill in 1918

Senator
- In office 2 January 1940 – 26 July 1943
- Constituency: Nominated by the Taoiseach

Senator
- In office 20 June 1929 – 29 May 1936

Teachta Dála
- In office June 1922 – August 1923
- Constituency: Dublin Mid

Lord Mayor of Dublin
- In office 1921–1924
- Preceded by: Thomas Kelly (Note: Thomas Kelly was unanimously elected as Lord Mayor of Dublin while being held in Wormwood Scrubs prison in England. Due to his imprisonment, he was unable to formally take up the position.)
- Succeeded by: Alfie Byrne (1930)
- In office 1917–1920
- Preceded by: Sir James Gallagher
- Succeeded by: Thomas Kelly

Personal details
- Born: 4 March 1864 Dublin, Ireland
- Died: 26 July 1943 (aged 79) Dublin, Ireland
- Party: Independent
- Education: Belvedere College

Laurence O'Neill (4 March 1864 – 26 July 1943) was an Irish politician and corn merchant who served as Lord Mayor of Dublin from 1917 to 1924, serving through the Irish War of Independence and the Irish Civil War. He refused an offer to act as Crown Prosecutor after the Easter Rising. During the 1920 Irish hunger strikes, O'Neill actively supported the demands of the 36 hunger strikers in Mountjoy Prison.

During his time as an elected official, O'Neill was criticised for "doing little to solve Dublin's dreadful housing problem". The problem could not be solved without generous government aid, which was not forthcoming, as the UK was involved in a world war. In an effort to restore peace during the 1922 Battle of Dublin, O'Neill chaired a committee of prominent women who met with military leaders on both sides. O'Neill was elected to Dáil Éireann as an independent Teachta Dála (TD) for Dublin Mid at the 1922 general election. He did not contest the 1923 general election and he was an unsuccessful candidate at the September 1927 general election.

He was elected to the Irish Free State Seanad Éireann at a by-election on 20 June 1929 to fill the vacancy caused by the resignation of Henry Petty-Fitzmaurice. He was re-elected to the Seanad for a 9-year term in 1931 and served until the Free State Seanad was abolished in 1936. He was nominated by the Taoiseach on 2 January 1940 to the 3rd Seanad. He did not contest the 1943 Seanad election.

== See also ==
- Conscription Crisis of 1918

Civic offices
Preceded by Sir James Gallagher	Lord Mayor of Dublin; 1917–1920	Vacant Position vacant due to Thomas Kelly's imprisonment.
Preceded by Thomas Kelly	Lord Mayor of Dublin; 1921–1924	Vacant Position suspended Title next held by Alfie Byrne (1930)

Dáil	Election	Deputy (Party)	Deputy (Party)	Deputy (Party)	Deputy (Party)
2nd	1921	Seán McGarry (SF)	Seán T. O'Kelly (SF)	Philip Shanahan (SF)	Kathleen Clarke (SF)
3rd	1922	Seán McGarry (PT-SF)	Seán T. O'Kelly (AT-SF)	Alfie Byrne (Ind.)	Laurence O'Neill (Ind.)
4th	1923	Constituency abolished. See Dublin North			
