= Margaret Collins-O'Driscoll =

Irish politician (1878–1945)

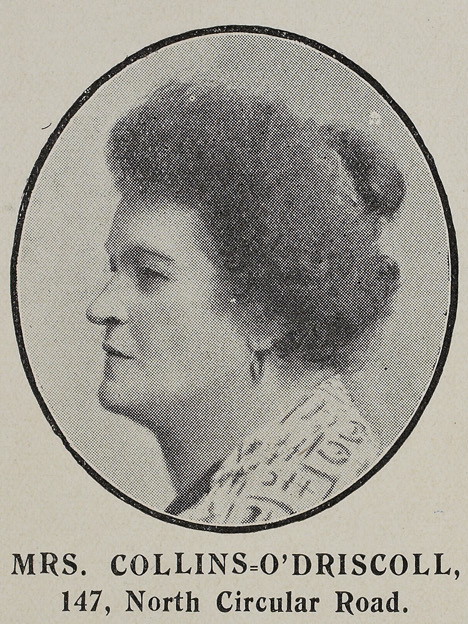
- Collins-O'Driscoll on a 1933 election poster

Teachta Dála
- In office August 1923 – January 1933
- Constituency: Dublin North

Personal details
- Born: Margaret Mary Collins; 18 August 1876 Clonakilty, County Cork, Ireland
- Died: 17 June 1945 (aged 68) Cabra, Dublin, Ireland
- Party: Cumann na nGaedheal
- Spouse: Patrick O'Driscoll (m. 1901)
- Children: 14
- Relatives: Michael Collins (brother); Dervla Kirwan (great-granddaughter)

Margaret Collins-O'Driscoll (18 August 1876 – 17 June 1945) was an Irish Cumann na nGaedheal politician who served as a Teachta Dála (TD) for the Dublin North constituency from 1923 to 1933.

== Early life ==
Margaret Mary Collins was born in Woodfield, Clonakilty, County Cork, on 18 August 1876. The eldest of three daughters and five sons of Michael Collins, a farmer, and Mary Anne O'Brien. She was the eldest sister of the Irish revolutionary leader Michael Collins. She was educated at Baggot Street Training College and was a schoolteacher and school principal before entering politics. A primary-school teacher, for many years she was the principal of Lisavaird girls' national school in Clonakilty, and also taught in Dublin.

== Politics ==
Collins-O'Driscoll was first elected to Dáil Éireann as a Cumann na nGaedheal TD for the eight-member Dublin North constituency at the 1923 general election, becoming her party's first woman TD. In 1926, she was elected vice-president of the party. She was the only woman to serve as a member of the Dáil between September 1927 and February 1932.

Socially conversative, Collins-O'Driscoll voted in favour of the 1928 Censorship of Publications bill, which banned indecent literature and publications that referred to birth control; and she voted with the government in favour of the 1924 and 1927 juries bills, which restricted jury service for women.

She was re-elected at each election after 1923, until she lost her seat at the 1933 general election.

== Family ==
She married Patrick O'Driscoll on 8 September 1901 at Rosscarbery's Roman Catholic chapel in County Cork. The couple had 14 children: five sons and nine daughters.

Actress Dervla Kirwan is a great-granddaughter of the O'Driscolls.

Dáil	Election	Deputy (Party)	Deputy (Party)	Deputy (Party)	Deputy (Party)	Deputy (Party)	Deputy (Party)	Deputy (Party)	Deputy (Party)
4th	1923	Alfie Byrne (Ind.)	Francis Cahill (CnaG)	Margaret Collins-O'Driscoll (CnaG)	Seán McGarry (CnaG)	William Hewat (BP)	Richard Mulcahy (CnaG)	Seán T. O'Kelly (Rep)	Ernie O'Malley (Rep)
4th	1925 by-election	Alfie Byrne (Ind.)	Patrick Leonard (CnaG)	Margaret Collins-O'Driscoll (CnaG)	Oscar Traynor (Rep)	William Hewat (BP)	Richard Mulcahy (CnaG)	Seán T. O'Kelly (Rep)	Ernie O'Malley (Rep)
5th	1927 (Jun)	Alfie Byrne (Ind.)	John Byrne (CnaG)	Margaret Collins-O'Driscoll (CnaG)	Oscar Traynor (SF)	Denis Cullen (Lab)	Richard Mulcahy (CnaG)	Seán T. O'Kelly (FF)	Kathleen Clarke (FF)
6th	1927 (Sep)	Alfie Byrne (Ind.)	John Byrne (CnaG)	Margaret Collins-O'Driscoll (CnaG)	Patrick Leonard (CnaG)	James Larkin (IWL)	Richard Mulcahy (CnaG)	Seán T. O'Kelly (FF)	Eamonn Cooney (FF)
6th	1928 by-election	Alfie Byrne (Ind.)	John Byrne (CnaG)	Margaret Collins-O'Driscoll (CnaG)	Patrick Leonard (CnaG)	Vincent Rice (CnaG)	Richard Mulcahy (CnaG)	Seán T. O'Kelly (FF)	Eamonn Cooney (FF)
6th	1929 by-election	Thomas F. O'Higgins (CnaG)	John Byrne (CnaG)	Margaret Collins-O'Driscoll (CnaG)	Patrick Leonard (CnaG)	Vincent Rice (CnaG)	Richard Mulcahy (CnaG)	Seán T. O'Kelly (FF)	Eamonn Cooney (FF)
7th	1932	Alfie Byrne (Ind.)	John Byrne (CnaG)	Margaret Collins-O'Driscoll (CnaG)	Oscar Traynor (FF)	Cormac Breathnach (FF)	Richard Mulcahy (CnaG)	Seán T. O'Kelly (FF)	Eamonn Cooney (FF)
8th	1933	Alfie Byrne (Ind.)	Patrick Belton (CnaG)	Vincent Rice (CnaG)	Oscar Traynor (FF)	Cormac Breathnach (FF)	Richard Mulcahy (CnaG)	Seán T. O'Kelly (FF)	Eamonn Cooney (FF)
9th	1937	Constituency abolished. See Dublin North-East and Dublin North-West							

Dáil	Election	Deputy (Party)	Deputy (Party)	Deputy (Party)	Deputy (Party)
22nd	1981	Ray Burke (FF)	John Boland (FG)	Nora Owen (FG)	3 seats 1981–1992
23rd	1982 (Feb)	Ray Burke (FF)	John Boland (FG)	Nora Owen (FG)	3 seats 1981–1992
24th	1982 (Nov)	Ray Burke (FF)	John Boland (FG)	Nora Owen (FG)	3 seats 1981–1992
25th	1987	Ray Burke (FF)	John Boland (FG)	G. V. Wright (FF)	3 seats 1981–1992
26th	1989	Ray Burke (FF)	Nora Owen (FG)	Seán Ryan (Lab)	3 seats 1981–1992
27th	1992	Ray Burke (FF)	Nora Owen (FG)	Seán Ryan (Lab)	Trevor Sargent (GP)
28th	1997	Ray Burke (FF)	Nora Owen (FG)	G. V. Wright (FF)	Trevor Sargent (GP)
28th	1998 by-election	Seán Ryan (Lab)	Nora Owen (FG)	G. V. Wright (FF)	Trevor Sargent (GP)
29th	2002	Seán Ryan (Lab)	Jim Glennon (FF)	G. V. Wright (FF)	Trevor Sargent (GP)
30th	2007	James Reilly (FG)	Michael Kennedy (FF)	Darragh O'Brien (FF)	Trevor Sargent (GP)
31st	2011	James Reilly (FG)	Alan Farrell (FG)	Brendan Ryan (Lab)	Clare Daly (SP)
32nd	2016	Constituency abolished. See Dublin Fingal			
