= Business and Professional Group =

Defunct Irish political party

The Business and Professional Group (also known as the Businessmen's Party) was a minor political party in the Irish Free State that existed between 1922 and 1923. It largely comprised ex-Unionist businessmen and professionals.

It fielded five candidates in Dublin and Cork at the 1922 general election. One candidate, Michael Hennessy, was elected. At the 1923 general election, company directors John Good and William Hewat were elected in Dublin under the label of Businessmen's Party. Andrew O'Shaughnessy and Richard Beamish were elected under the label of Cork Progressive Association (CPA). Both CPA members however sat in the Dáil Éireann as independent and in 1924 both took the Cumann na nGaedheal party whip.

The group's support base was largely Protestant; its policies were pro-Treaty and pro-economic orthodoxy, including low taxes and the Treasury view. It did not contest any general elections after 1923.

== General election results ==
| Election | Seats won | ± | Position | First Pref votes | % | Government |
|---|---|---|---|---|---|---|
| 1922 | 1 / 128 | ▲1 | ▲5th | 14,542 | 2.3% | Opposition |
| 1923 | 2 / 153 | ▲1 | 5th | 9,648 | 0.9% | Opposition |

== Sources ==
- Barberis, Peter; McHugh, John; Tyldesley, Mike (2005). Encyclopedia of British and Irish Political Organisations. London: Continuum International Publishing Group. ISBN 978-0-8264-5814-8.
