= Seán McGarry =

Irish nationalist and politician (1886–1958)

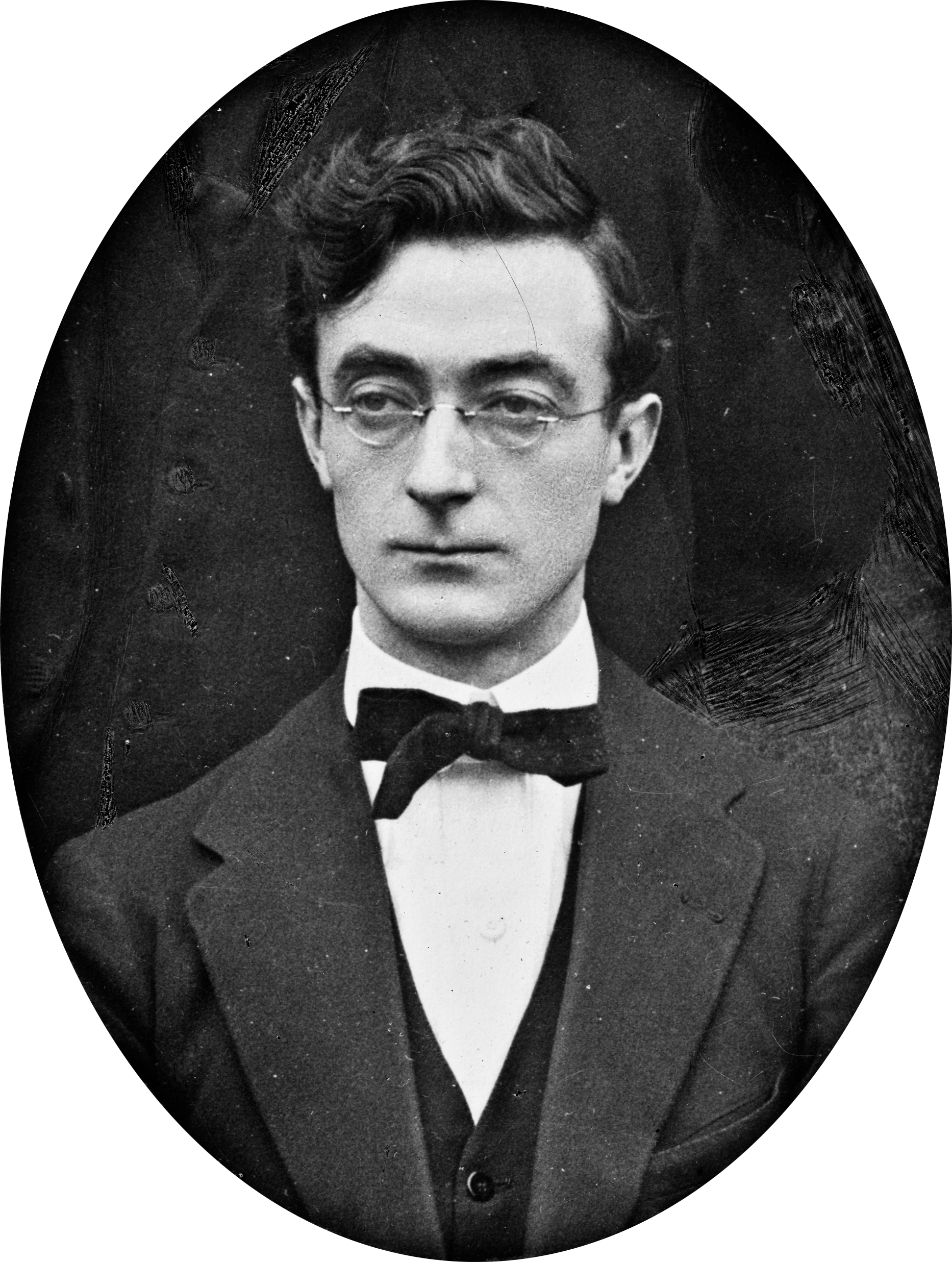
- McGarry, c. 1915

Teachta Dála
- In office August 1923 – 30 October 1924
- Constituency: Dublin North
- In office May 1921 – August 1923
- Constituency: Dublin Mid

President of the Irish Republican Brotherhood
- In office November 1917 – May 1919
- Preceded by: Thomas Ashe
- Succeeded by: Harry Boland

Personal details
- Born: 2 August 1886 Dundrum, Dublin, Ireland
- Died: 9 December 1958 (aged 72) Dublin, Ireland
- Party: Sinn Féin; Cumann na nGaedheal; National Group
- Spouse: Tomasina McGarry
- Children: 3

Military service
- Branch/service: Irish Volunteers; Irish Republican Brotherhood; National Army
- Battles/wars: Easter Rising; Irish War of Independence; Irish Civil War

Seán McGarry (2 August 1886 – 9 December 1958) was a 20th-century Irish nationalist and politician. A longtime senior member of the Irish Republican Brotherhood (IRB), he served as its president from May 1917 until May 1918 when he was one of a number of nationalist leaders arrested for his alleged involvement in the so-called German Plot.

== Biography ==
He was born in number 17, Pembroke Cottages, Dundrum, Dublin in 1886. An active member of the Irish Republican Brotherhood, McGarry was a close friend of Bulmer Hobson and was frequently arrested or imprisoned by British authorities for his activities with the IRB during the early 1900s. McGarry participated in the 1916 Easter Rising as an aide-de-camp to Tom Clarke and sentenced to eight years penal servitude for his role in the failed rebellion.

He was sent to Frongoch internment camp in Wales, but was eventually released. McGarry assisted Michael Collins in his efforts to reorganise the Irish Republican Brotherhood and, at the Volunteer Executive Meeting held in late 1917, he was elected General Secretary of the Irish Volunteers.

On the night of 17 May 1918, McGarry was arrested, along with seventy-three other Irish nationalist leaders, and deported to England, where they were held in custody without charge. The day following their arrest, he and the others were charged with conspiring "to enter into, and have entered into, treasonable communication with the German enemy". In his absence, Harry Boland was selected for the Supreme Council and became his successor as president of the IRB.

He was only imprisoned a short time when he took part in the famous escape from Lincoln Jail with Seán Milroy and Éamon de Valera on 3 February 1919. He and Milroy had managed to smuggle out a postcard, a comical sketch of McGarry to his wife, allowing a copy of the key to their cell to be made. They were later assisted by Harry Boland and Michael Collins who awaited them outside the prison.

A month later, McGarry gave a dramatic speech at a Sinn Féin concert held at the Mansion House, Dublin before going into hiding.

Throughout the Irish War of Independence, McGarry served as a commander and was eventually elected to Second Dáil at the 1921 elections as a Sinn Féin Teachta Dála (TD) representing Dublin Mid. He, like the majority of those in the Irish Republican Brotherhood, supported the Anglo-Irish Treaty and was involved in debates against de Valera during the controversy, most especially discussing the status of Sinn Féin as a political entity.

He was re-elected as a Pro-Treaty Sinn Féin TD at the 1922 general election, siding with the Free State government during the Irish Civil War. Liam Lynch and other members of the anti-Treaty IRA planned the assassination of McGarry among other TDs supporting the Public Safety Bill. As one anti-Treaty volunteer told Ernie O'Malley, "Seán McGarry was often drunk in Amiens St. and the boys wanted to shoot him and the Staters there but I wouldn't let them..."

On 10 December 1922, shortly before the first meeting of the Free State parliament, a fire was deliberately set by irregulars (anti-Treatyites) at his family home. His seven-year-old son, Emmet, was badly burned and died as a result. Seán McGarry was one of four targeted by anti-Treatyites during the December Free State executions. De Valera publicly denounced the attack.

McGarry was re-elected as a Cumann na nGaedheal TD at the 1923 general election for Dublin North. Dissatisfied and disillusioned with Cumann na nGeadhael, he resigned from the party after the Irish Army Mutiny and joined Joseph McGrath's National Group. He resigned his seat in October 1924.

After retiring from politics, he worked for the Irish Hospitals Trust.

== Gallery ==
British Army military intelligence file for Seán McGarry

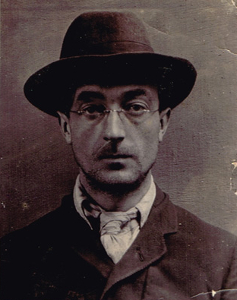
Mugshot of Seán McGarry taken by Dublin Metropolitan Police circa 1916

Political offices
Preceded by Thomas Ashe	President of the Irish Republican Brotherhood; 1917–1919	Succeeded by Harry Boland

Dáil	Election	Deputy (Party)	Deputy (Party)	Deputy (Party)	Deputy (Party)
2nd	1921	Seán McGarry (SF)	Seán T. O'Kelly (SF)	Philip Shanahan (SF)	Kathleen Clarke (SF)
3rd	1922	Seán McGarry (PT-SF)	Seán T. O'Kelly (AT-SF)	Alfie Byrne (Ind.)	Laurence O'Neill (Ind.)
4th	1923	Constituency abolished. See Dublin North			

Dáil	Election	Deputy (Party)	Deputy (Party)	Deputy (Party)	Deputy (Party)	Deputy (Party)	Deputy (Party)	Deputy (Party)	Deputy (Party)
4th	1923	Alfie Byrne (Ind.)	Francis Cahill (CnaG)	Margaret Collins-O'Driscoll (CnaG)	Seán McGarry (CnaG)	William Hewat (BP)	Richard Mulcahy (CnaG)	Seán T. O'Kelly (Rep)	Ernie O'Malley (Rep)
4th	1925 by-election	Alfie Byrne (Ind.)	Patrick Leonard (CnaG)	Margaret Collins-O'Driscoll (CnaG)	Oscar Traynor (Rep)	William Hewat (BP)	Richard Mulcahy (CnaG)	Seán T. O'Kelly (Rep)	Ernie O'Malley (Rep)
5th	1927 (Jun)	Alfie Byrne (Ind.)	John Byrne (CnaG)	Margaret Collins-O'Driscoll (CnaG)	Oscar Traynor (SF)	Denis Cullen (Lab)	Richard Mulcahy (CnaG)	Seán T. O'Kelly (FF)	Kathleen Clarke (FF)
6th	1927 (Sep)	Alfie Byrne (Ind.)	John Byrne (CnaG)	Margaret Collins-O'Driscoll (CnaG)	Patrick Leonard (CnaG)	James Larkin (IWL)	Richard Mulcahy (CnaG)	Seán T. O'Kelly (FF)	Eamonn Cooney (FF)
6th	1928 by-election	Alfie Byrne (Ind.)	John Byrne (CnaG)	Margaret Collins-O'Driscoll (CnaG)	Patrick Leonard (CnaG)	Vincent Rice (CnaG)	Richard Mulcahy (CnaG)	Seán T. O'Kelly (FF)	Eamonn Cooney (FF)
6th	1929 by-election	Thomas F. O'Higgins (CnaG)	John Byrne (CnaG)	Margaret Collins-O'Driscoll (CnaG)	Patrick Leonard (CnaG)	Vincent Rice (CnaG)	Richard Mulcahy (CnaG)	Seán T. O'Kelly (FF)	Eamonn Cooney (FF)
7th	1932	Alfie Byrne (Ind.)	John Byrne (CnaG)	Margaret Collins-O'Driscoll (CnaG)	Oscar Traynor (FF)	Cormac Breathnach (FF)	Richard Mulcahy (CnaG)	Seán T. O'Kelly (FF)	Eamonn Cooney (FF)
8th	1933	Alfie Byrne (Ind.)	Patrick Belton (CnaG)	Vincent Rice (CnaG)	Oscar Traynor (FF)	Cormac Breathnach (FF)	Richard Mulcahy (CnaG)	Seán T. O'Kelly (FF)	Eamonn Cooney (FF)
9th	1937	Constituency abolished. See Dublin North-East and Dublin North-West							

Dáil	Election	Deputy (Party)	Deputy (Party)	Deputy (Party)	Deputy (Party)
22nd	1981	Ray Burke (FF)	John Boland (FG)	Nora Owen (FG)	3 seats 1981–1992
23rd	1982 (Feb)	Ray Burke (FF)	John Boland (FG)	Nora Owen (FG)	3 seats 1981–1992
24th	1982 (Nov)	Ray Burke (FF)	John Boland (FG)	Nora Owen (FG)	3 seats 1981–1992
25th	1987	Ray Burke (FF)	John Boland (FG)	G. V. Wright (FF)	3 seats 1981–1992
26th	1989	Ray Burke (FF)	Nora Owen (FG)	Seán Ryan (Lab)	3 seats 1981–1992
27th	1992	Ray Burke (FF)	Nora Owen (FG)	Seán Ryan (Lab)	Trevor Sargent (GP)
28th	1997	Ray Burke (FF)	Nora Owen (FG)	G. V. Wright (FF)	Trevor Sargent (GP)
28th	1998 by-election	Seán Ryan (Lab)	Nora Owen (FG)	G. V. Wright (FF)	Trevor Sargent (GP)
29th	2002	Seán Ryan (Lab)	Jim Glennon (FF)	G. V. Wright (FF)	Trevor Sargent (GP)
30th	2007	James Reilly (FG)	Michael Kennedy (FF)	Darragh O'Brien (FF)	Trevor Sargent (GP)
31st	2011	James Reilly (FG)	Alan Farrell (FG)	Brendan Ryan (Lab)	Clare Daly (SP)
32nd	2016	Constituency abolished. See Dublin Fingal			
