= Francis Cahill =

Irish politician (1882–1957)

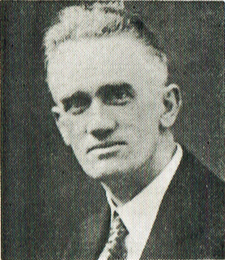
- Cahill, c.1917–1923

Teachta Dála
- In office August 1923 – 30 October 1924
- Constituency: Dublin North

Personal details
- Born: 1882 Dublin, Ireland
- Died: 19 October 1957 (aged 74–75) Dublin, Ireland
- Party: Cumann na nGaedheal (1923–1924)
- Other political affiliations: Sinn Féin; National Group (1924)
- Spouse: Hannah Barry Cahill
- Profession: Teacher

Francis Cahill (c. 1882 – 19 October 1957) was an Irish nationalist, teacher and politician. Prominently associated with the Gaelic League, the Irish Republican Brotherhood (IRB) and the Irish-Ireland movement. A teacher by profession Frank taught for 50 years in St Laurence O'Toole C.B.S., Seville Place, Dublin.

A close friend of Arthur Griffith and Seán O'Casey as well as the leaders of the Easter rising Tom Clarke and Seán Mac Diarmada, Cahill was dedicated to the cause of Irish independence and Gaelic revival.

In 1901 he founded the St. Laurence O'Toole Gaelic Athletic Club and would go on in 1910 to form the St. Laurence O'Toole Pipe Band and drama group with Seán O'Casey.

In 1928 he led the way in setting up Primary Schools' League GAA (Cumann na mBunscol) to promote Gaelic culture.

Having been an Alderman for Sinn Féin on Dublin Corporation for several years Cahill was elected to Dáil Éireann as a Cumann na nGaedheal Teachta Dála (TD) for the Dublin North constituency at the 1923 general election. He resigned his seat on 30 October 1924 following the Irish Army Mutiny and, along with several other members of the Dáil, formed the National Group. In 1925 he was nominated for the Seanad but was not elected.

After retirement from teaching an inter-county senior football testimonial match between Meath and Louth was held at Croke Park to recognise Frank's life of service to the national game.

On his death in 1957 the Frank Cahill memorial committee was formed to recognize his contributions to the GAA and Parish. A GAA trophy (The Frank Cahill Cup), awarded at primary level, was named after Cahill and a plaque and statue of Our Lady of Lourdes was erected in the grounds of St. Laurence O'Toole's church, North Wall.

Dáil	Election	Deputy (Party)	Deputy (Party)	Deputy (Party)	Deputy (Party)	Deputy (Party)	Deputy (Party)	Deputy (Party)	Deputy (Party)
4th	1923	Alfie Byrne (Ind.)	Francis Cahill (CnaG)	Margaret Collins-O'Driscoll (CnaG)	Seán McGarry (CnaG)	William Hewat (BP)	Richard Mulcahy (CnaG)	Seán T. O'Kelly (Rep)	Ernie O'Malley (Rep)
4th	1925 by-election	Alfie Byrne (Ind.)	Patrick Leonard (CnaG)	Margaret Collins-O'Driscoll (CnaG)	Oscar Traynor (Rep)	William Hewat (BP)	Richard Mulcahy (CnaG)	Seán T. O'Kelly (Rep)	Ernie O'Malley (Rep)
5th	1927 (Jun)	Alfie Byrne (Ind.)	John Byrne (CnaG)	Margaret Collins-O'Driscoll (CnaG)	Oscar Traynor (SF)	Denis Cullen (Lab)	Richard Mulcahy (CnaG)	Seán T. O'Kelly (FF)	Kathleen Clarke (FF)
6th	1927 (Sep)	Alfie Byrne (Ind.)	John Byrne (CnaG)	Margaret Collins-O'Driscoll (CnaG)	Patrick Leonard (CnaG)	James Larkin (IWL)	Richard Mulcahy (CnaG)	Seán T. O'Kelly (FF)	Eamonn Cooney (FF)
6th	1928 by-election	Alfie Byrne (Ind.)	John Byrne (CnaG)	Margaret Collins-O'Driscoll (CnaG)	Patrick Leonard (CnaG)	Vincent Rice (CnaG)	Richard Mulcahy (CnaG)	Seán T. O'Kelly (FF)	Eamonn Cooney (FF)
6th	1929 by-election	Thomas F. O'Higgins (CnaG)	John Byrne (CnaG)	Margaret Collins-O'Driscoll (CnaG)	Patrick Leonard (CnaG)	Vincent Rice (CnaG)	Richard Mulcahy (CnaG)	Seán T. O'Kelly (FF)	Eamonn Cooney (FF)
7th	1932	Alfie Byrne (Ind.)	John Byrne (CnaG)	Margaret Collins-O'Driscoll (CnaG)	Oscar Traynor (FF)	Cormac Breathnach (FF)	Richard Mulcahy (CnaG)	Seán T. O'Kelly (FF)	Eamonn Cooney (FF)
8th	1933	Alfie Byrne (Ind.)	Patrick Belton (CnaG)	Vincent Rice (CnaG)	Oscar Traynor (FF)	Cormac Breathnach (FF)	Richard Mulcahy (CnaG)	Seán T. O'Kelly (FF)	Eamonn Cooney (FF)
9th	1937	Constituency abolished. See Dublin North-East and Dublin North-West							

Dáil	Election	Deputy (Party)	Deputy (Party)	Deputy (Party)	Deputy (Party)
22nd	1981	Ray Burke (FF)	John Boland (FG)	Nora Owen (FG)	3 seats 1981–1992
23rd	1982 (Feb)	Ray Burke (FF)	John Boland (FG)	Nora Owen (FG)	3 seats 1981–1992
24th	1982 (Nov)	Ray Burke (FF)	John Boland (FG)	Nora Owen (FG)	3 seats 1981–1992
25th	1987	Ray Burke (FF)	John Boland (FG)	G. V. Wright (FF)	3 seats 1981–1992
26th	1989	Ray Burke (FF)	Nora Owen (FG)	Seán Ryan (Lab)	3 seats 1981–1992
27th	1992	Ray Burke (FF)	Nora Owen (FG)	Seán Ryan (Lab)	Trevor Sargent (GP)
28th	1997	Ray Burke (FF)	Nora Owen (FG)	G. V. Wright (FF)	Trevor Sargent (GP)
28th	1998 by-election	Seán Ryan (Lab)	Nora Owen (FG)	G. V. Wright (FF)	Trevor Sargent (GP)
29th	2002	Seán Ryan (Lab)	Jim Glennon (FF)	G. V. Wright (FF)	Trevor Sargent (GP)
30th	2007	James Reilly (FG)	Michael Kennedy (FF)	Darragh O'Brien (FF)	Trevor Sargent (GP)
31st	2011	James Reilly (FG)	Alan Farrell (FG)	Brendan Ryan (Lab)	Clare Daly (SP)
32nd	2016	Constituency abolished. See Dublin Fingal			
