= Thomas Hennessy =

Thomas Hennessy may refer to:

- Thomas Hennessy (politician) (fl. 1925–1933), Irish Cumann na nGaedheal politician
- Thomas Hennessy (American football) (born 1994), American football long snapper
