= Celia Lynch =

Irish politician (1908–1989)

- Lynch, c. 1930

Teachta Dála
- In office October 1961 – June 1977
- Constituency: Dublin North-Central
- In office May 1954 – October 1961
- Constituency: Dublin South-Central

Personal details
- Born: Celia Quinn; 6 May 1908 Duras House, Kinvara, County Galway, Ireland
- Died: 15 June 1989 (aged 81) Dublin, Ireland
- Party: Fianna Fáil
- Spouse: James B. Lynch
- Children: 7
- Education: University College Galway; University College Dublin

Celia Lynch (née Quinn; 6 May 1908 – 16 June 1989) was an Irish Fianna Fáil politician, assistant Government Whip, and Teachta Dála (TD) for 23 years. She also served as a Dublin City Councillor for many years.

Her birthplace was Duras House, Kinvara, County Galway. Her husband James B. Lynch was a TD and Senator from 1932 until his death in 1954. A schoolteacher before marriage, Lynch was elected to Dáil Éireann on her first attempt, as a Fianna Fáil candidate for the Dublin South-Central constituency at the 1954 general election, taking her seat in the 15th Dáil. She was re-elected at the next 1957 general election. At the 1961 general election, she was elected for Dublin North-Central, where she was returned again at three further general elections before retiring from politics at the 1977 general election.

She lived at 156 Botanic Road, Glasnevin.

== See also ==
- Families in the Oireachtas

| Dáil | Election | Deputy (Party) | Deputy (Party) | Deputy (Party) | Deputy (Party) | Deputy (Party) |
|---|---|---|---|---|---|---|
| 13th | 1948 | Seán Lemass (FF) | James Larkin Jnr (Lab) | Con Lehane (CnaP) | Maurice E. Dockrell (FG) | John McCann (FF) |
| 14th | 1951 | Seán Lemass (FF) | James Larkin Jnr (Lab) | Philip Brady (FF) | Maurice E. Dockrell (FG) | John McCann (FF) |
| 15th | 1954 | Seán Lemass (FF) | James Larkin Jnr (Lab) | Thomas Finlay (FG) | Maurice E. Dockrell (FG) | Celia Lynch (FF) |
| 16th | 1957 | Seán Lemass (FF) | Jack Murphy (Ind.) | Philip Brady (FF) | Maurice E. Dockrell (FG) | Celia Lynch (FF) |
| 16th | 1958 by-election | Seán Lemass (FF) | Patrick Cummins (FF) | Philip Brady (FF) | Maurice E. Dockrell (FG) | Celia Lynch (FF) |
| 17th | 1961 | Seán Lemass (FF) | Patrick Cummins (FF) | Philip Brady (FF) | Maurice E. Dockrell (FG) | Joseph Barron (CnaP) |
| 18th | 1965 | Seán Lemass (FF) | Frank Cluskey (Lab) | Philip Brady (FF) | Maurice E. Dockrell (FG) | Thomas J. Fitzpatrick (FF) |
| 19th | 1969 | Richie Ryan (FG) | Ben Briscoe (FF) | Philip Brady (FF) | John O'Donovan (Lab) | 4 seats 1969–1977 |
| 20th | 1973 | Richie Ryan (FG) | Ben Briscoe (FF) | Philip Brady (FF) | John Kelly (FG) | 4 seats 1969–1977 |
| 21st | 1977 | Fergus O'Brien (FG) | Frank Cluskey (Lab) | Thomas J. Fitzpatrick (FF) | 3 seats 1977–1981 | |
| 22nd | 1981 | Fergus O'Brien (FG) | Ben Briscoe (FF) | Thomas J. Fitzpatrick (FF) | Gay Mitchell (FG) | John O'Connell (Note: O'Connell served as Ceann Comhairle in the 22nd and 23rd Dáil from 1981 to 1983 and was returned automatically at the February 1982 and November 1982 general elections. He joined Fianna Fáil in January 1985.) (Ind.) |
| 23rd | 1982 (Feb) | Frank Cluskey (Lab) | Ben Briscoe (FF) | Thomas J. Fitzpatrick (FF) | Gay Mitchell (FG) | John O'Connell (Ind.) |
| 24th | 1982 (Nov) | Frank Cluskey (Lab) | Ben Briscoe (FF) | Fergus O'Brien (FG) | Gay Mitchell (FG) | John O'Connell (Ind.) |
| 25th | 1987 | Frank Cluskey (Lab) | Ben Briscoe (FF) | Fergus O'Brien (FG) | Gay Mitchell (FG) | Mary Mooney (FF) |
| 26th | 1989 | John O'Connell (FF) | Ben Briscoe (FF) | Fergus O'Brien (FG) | Gay Mitchell (FG) | Eric Byrne (WP) |
| 27th | 1992 | John O'Connell (FF) | Ben Briscoe (FF) | Pat Upton (Lab) | Gay Mitchell (FG) | 4 seats 1992–2002 |
| 27th | 1994 by-election | Eric Byrne (DL) | Ben Briscoe (FF) | Pat Upton (Lab) | Gay Mitchell (FG) | 4 seats 1992–2002 |
| 28th | 1997 | Seán Ardagh (FF) | Ben Briscoe (FF) | Pat Upton (Lab) | Gay Mitchell (FG) | 4 seats 1992–2002 |
| 28th | 1999 by-election | Seán Ardagh (FF) | Ben Briscoe (FF) | Mary Upton (Lab) | Gay Mitchell (FG) | 4 seats 1992–2002 |
| 29th | 2002 | Seán Ardagh (FF) | Aengus Ó Snodaigh (SF) | Mary Upton (Lab) | Gay Mitchell (FG) | Michael Mulcahy (FF) |
| 30th | 2007 | Seán Ardagh (FF) | Aengus Ó Snodaigh (SF) | Mary Upton (Lab) | Catherine Byrne (FG) | Michael Mulcahy (FF) |
| 31st | 2011 | Eric Byrne (Lab) | Aengus Ó Snodaigh (SF) | Joan Collins (PBP) | Catherine Byrne (FG) | Michael Conaghan (Lab) |
| 32nd | 2016 | Bríd Smith (AAA–PBP) | Aengus Ó Snodaigh (SF) | Joan Collins (Note: Founded Right to Change in May 2020.) (I4C) | Catherine Byrne (FG) | 4 seats from 2016 |
| 33rd | 2020 | Bríd Smith (S–PBP) | Aengus Ó Snodaigh (SF) | Joan Collins (I4C) | Patrick Costello (GP) | 4 seats from 2016 |
| 34th | 2024 | Catherine Ardagh (FF) | Aengus Ó Snodaigh (SF) | Máire Devine (SF) | Jen Cummins (SD) | 4 seats from 2016 |

| Dáil | Election | Deputy (Party) | Deputy (Party) | Deputy (Party) | Deputy (Party) |
|---|---|---|---|---|---|
| 13th | 1948 | Vivion de Valera (FF) | Martin O'Sullivan (Lab) | Patrick McGilligan (FG) | 3 seats 1948–1961 |
| 14th | 1951 | Vivion de Valera (FF) | Colm Gallagher (FF) | Patrick McGilligan (FG) | 3 seats 1948–1961 |
| 15th | 1954 | Vivion de Valera (FF) | Maureen O'Carroll (Lab) | Patrick McGilligan (FG) | 3 seats 1948–1961 |
| 16th | 1957 | Vivion de Valera (FF) | Colm Gallagher (FF) | Patrick McGilligan (FG) | 3 seats 1948–1961 |
| 16th | 1957 by-election | Vivion de Valera (FF) | Frank Sherwin (Ind.) | Patrick McGilligan (FG) | 3 seats 1948–1961 |
| 17th | 1961 | Vivion de Valera (FF) | Frank Sherwin (Ind.) | Patrick McGilligan (FG) | Celia Lynch (FF) |
| 18th | 1965 | Vivion de Valera (FF) | Michael O'Leary (Lab) | Luke Belton (FG) | Celia Lynch (FF) |
| 19th | 1969 | George Colley (FF) | Michael O'Leary (Lab) | Luke Belton (FG) | Celia Lynch (FF) |
| 20th | 1973 | George Colley (FF) | Michael O'Leary (Lab) | Luke Belton (FG) | Celia Lynch (FF) |
| 21st | 1977 | Vincent Brady (FF) | Michael O'Leary (Lab) | Michael Keating (FG) | 3 seats 1977–1981 |
| 22nd | 1981 | Vincent Brady (FF) | Charles Haughey (FF) | Noël Browne (SLP) | George Birmingham (FG) |
| 23rd | 1982 (Feb) | Vincent Brady (FF) | Charles Haughey (FF) | Richard Bruton (FG) | George Birmingham (FG) |
| 24th | 1982 (Nov) | Vincent Brady (FF) | Charles Haughey (FF) | Richard Bruton (FG) | George Birmingham (FG) |
| 25th | 1987 | Vincent Brady (FF) | Charles Haughey (FF) | Richard Bruton (FG) | George Birmingham (FG) |
| 26th | 1989 | Vincent Brady (FF) | Charles Haughey (FF) | Richard Bruton (FG) | Ivor Callely (FF) |
| 27th | 1992 | Seán Haughey (FF) | Derek McDowell (Lab) | Richard Bruton (FG) | Ivor Callely (FF) |
| 28th | 1997 | Seán Haughey (FF) | Derek McDowell (Lab) | Richard Bruton (FG) | Ivor Callely (FF) |
| 29th | 2002 | Seán Haughey (FF) | Finian McGrath (Ind.) | Richard Bruton (FG) | Ivor Callely (FF) |
| 30th | 2007 | Seán Haughey (FF) | Finian McGrath (Ind.) | Richard Bruton (FG) | 3 seats from 2007 |
| 31st | 2011 | Aodhán Ó Ríordáin (Lab) | Finian McGrath (Ind.) | Richard Bruton (FG) | 3 seats from 2007 |
| 32nd | 2016 | Constituency abolished. See Dublin Bay North | | | |
