= 1927 Dublin South by-election =

By-election to the 5th Dáil

- 24 August 1927
- Turnout: 43,901 (54.1%)
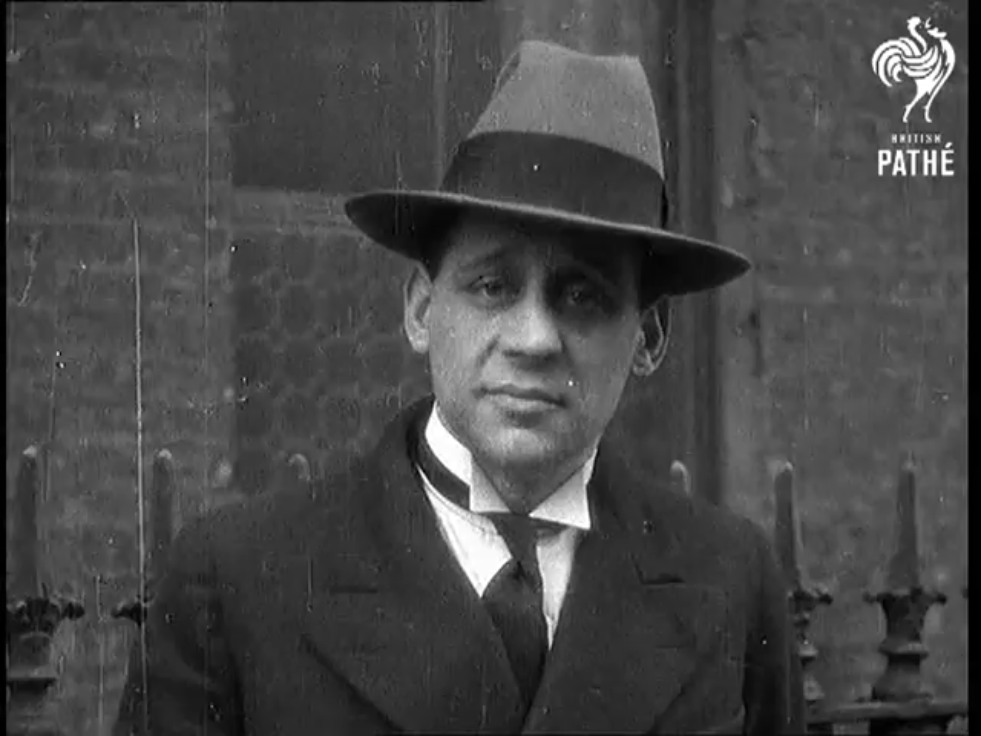

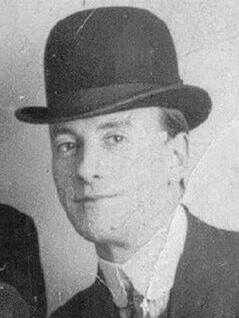
	Hennessy
Nominee	Thomas Hennessy	Robert Briscoe	Cathal Ó Murchadha
Party	Cumann na nGaedheal	Fianna Fáil	Sinn Féin
First preferences	24,139	18,647	1,115
Percentage	55.0%	42.5%	2.5%
TD before election
Constance Markievicz
Fianna Fáil
TD after election
Thomas Hennessy
Cumann na nGaedheal

A Dáil by-election was held in the constituency of Dublin South in the Irish Free State on Wednesday, 24 August 1927, to fill a vacancy in the 5th Dáil.

== Constituency ==
Dublin South was a seven seat constituency which included the borough electoral areas of Dublin 3, 5, 7, 9, and 10, being the wards of Fitzwilliam, Mansion House, Royal Exchange, South City, Merchant's Quay, New Kilmainham, Usher's Quay, Wood Quay, South Dock and Trinity.

== Background ==
Constance Markievicz died on 15 July 1927. Markievicz was a leader of Irish Citizen Army during the Easter Rising. She was elected for Dublin St Patrick's at the 1918 general election, becoming the first woman to be elected to the House of Commons of the United Kingdom. As with all elected for Sinn Féin, she did not sit at Westminster, but sat as a TD in Dáil Éireann. In April 1919, she was appointed as Secretary for Labour She was elected at the uncontested 1921 election for Dublin South, losing her seat at the 1922 general election. She was elected at the 1923 general election, joining Fianna Fáil in 1926.

The writ of election to fill the vacancy was agreed by the Dáil on 2 August 1927. The Cumann na nGaedheal candidate, Thomas Hennessy, had been elected for Dublin South at the 1925 by-election, but did not contest the June 1927 general election. The Fianna Fáil candidate, Robert Briscoe, had contested the June 1927 general election. The Sinn Féin candidate, Cathal Ó Murchadha, was elected at the uncontested 1921 election for Dublin South, losing his seat at the 1922 general election. He was elected at the 1923 general election, staying with Sinn Féin after 1926.

On 16 August 1927, the 3rd Executive Council, led by W. T. Cosgrave, survived a motion of no confidence on the casting vote of the Ceann Comhairle. Following the vote, the Dáil adjourned to 11 October 1927.

== Result ==
The by-election was held on 24 August 1927. It was held on the same day as the 1927 Dublin County by-election which followed the assassination of Kevin O'Higgins. The seat was won by Thomas Hennessy. He became the first and, as of 2026, the only person to win two Dáil by-elections. The by-election in Dublin County was also won by the Cumann na nGaedheal candidate.

1927 Dublin South by-election
Party	Candidate	FPv%	Count
Party	Candidate	FPv%	1
Cumann na nGaedheal	Thomas Hennessy	55.0	24,139
Fianna Fáil	Robert Briscoe	42.5	18,647
Sinn Féin	Cathal Ó Murchadha	2.5	1,115
Electorate: 81,136 Valid: 43,901 Quota: 21,951 Turnout: 54.1%

== Aftermath ==
On the evening of 25 August, following the result of the by-elections, Cosgrave sought a dissolution of the 5th Dáil, which was granted by the Governor-General. This was followed by the September 1927 general election. The 5th Dáil is the shortest in the history of the state, lasting only 63 days.

Both Hennessy and Briscoe were elected in September. Ó Murchadha did not contest; after the two by-elections in August 1927, Sinn Féin did not contest a Dáil election until the 1954 general election.
