= Dublin South (Dáil constituency) =

Dáil constituency (1921–1948, 1981–2016)

- Former Dáil constituency
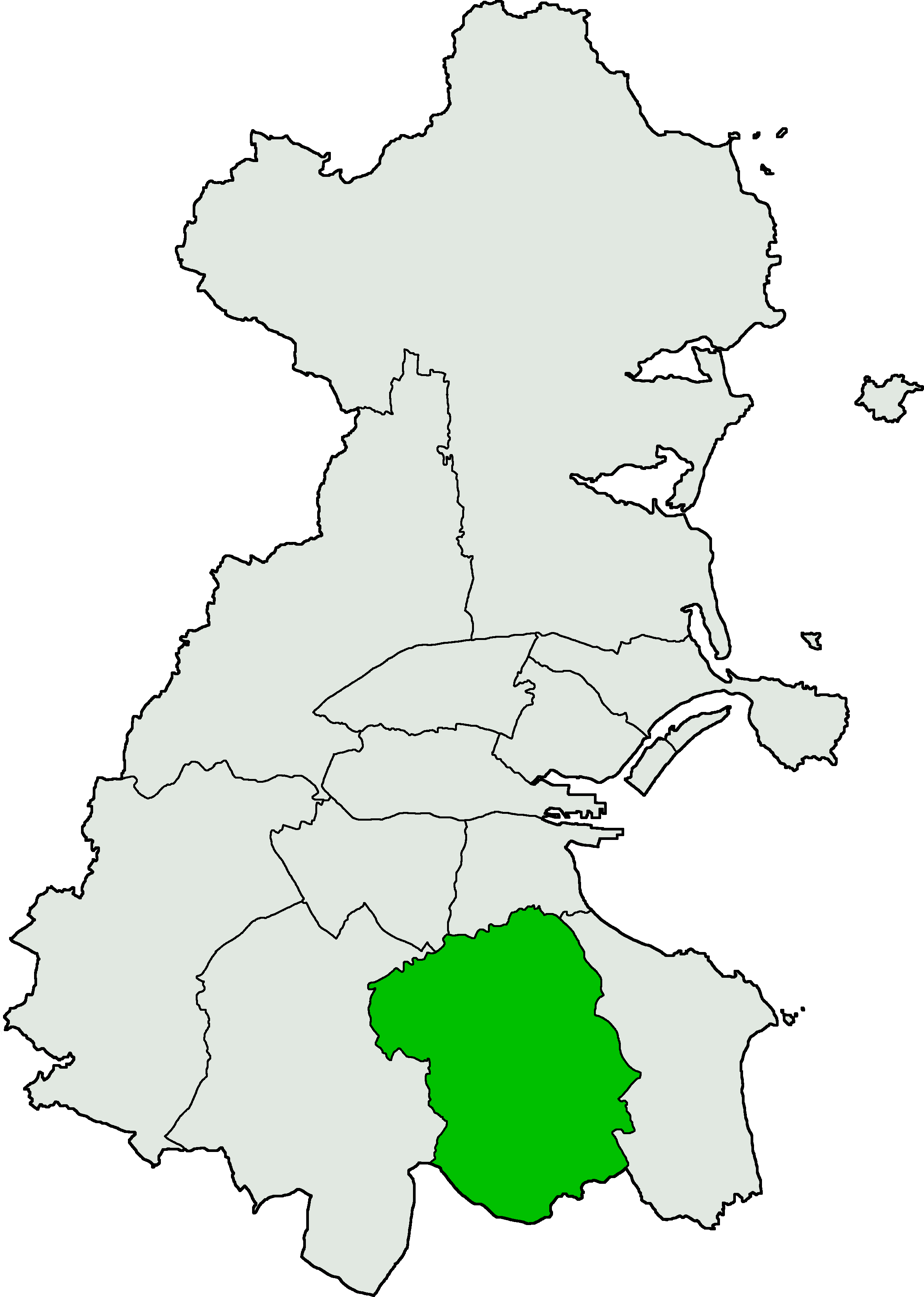
- Location of Dublin South within County Dublin

Former constituency
- Created: 1981
- Abolished: 2016
- Seats: 5
- Local government areas: Dún Laoghaire–Rathdown; South Dublin
- Created from: Dublin County South; Dublin County Mid
- Replaced by: Dublin Rathdown; Dublin South-West; Dún Laoghaire

Dublin South
- Former Dáil constituency

Former constituency
- Created: 1921
- Abolished: 1948
- Seats: 4 (1921–1923); 7 (1923–1948)
- Local government area: Dublin City
- Created from: Dublin St Patrick's; Dublin St Stephen's Green
- Replaced by: Dublin South-Central; Dublin South-East; Dublin South-West

Dublin South was a parliamentary constituency represented in Dáil Éireann, the lower house of the Irish parliament or Oireachtas, from 1981 to 2016 representing an area in the south of County Dublin (later Dún Laoghaire–Rathdown and South Dublin). A previous constituency of the same name existed in Dublin City from 1921 to 1948. The method of election was proportional representation by means of the single transferable vote (PR-STV).

== History and boundaries ==
=== 1921 to 1948 ===
A Dublin South constituency existed in Dublin City from 1921 to 1948. The first constituency of this name was created by the Government of Ireland Act 1920 as a 4-seat constituency for the Southern Ireland House of Commons and a single-seat constituency for the United Kingdom House of Commons at Westminster, combining the former Westminster constituencies of St Patrick's and St Stephen's Green. At the 1921 election for the Southern Ireland House of Commons, the four seats were won uncontested by Sinn Féin, who treated it as part of the election to the Second Dáil. It was never used as a Westminster constituency; under s. 1(4) of the Irish Free State (Agreement) Act 1922, no writ was to be issued "for a constituency in Ireland other than a constituency in Northern Ireland". Therefore, no vote was held in Dublin South at the 1922 United Kingdom general election on 15 November 1922, shortly before the Irish Free State left the United Kingdom on 6 December 1922. It was restructured by the Electoral Act 1923, the first electoral act of the new state.

Changes to the Dublin South constituency 1921–1937
Years	TDs	Boundaries	Notes
1921–1923	4	Merchants' Quay and Wood Quay; and Royal Exchange, Fitzwilliam and Mansion House wards and those parts of the South Dock and Trinity wards not contained within the Dublin Mid constituency	Amalgamation of former St Patrick's and St Stephen's Green constituencies.
1923–1937	7	Dublin No. 3 [Fitzwilliam, Mansion House, Royal Exchange, South City], Dublin No. 5 [Merchant's Quay], Dublin No. 7 [New Kilmainham and Usher's Quay], Dublin No. 9 [Wood Quay] and Dublin No. 10 [South Dock and Trinity].	New Kilmainham and Usher's Quay from the Dublin North-West; balance of South Dock and Trinity from Dublin Mid
1937–1948	5	The Fitzwilliam, Merchants Quay, Mansion House, New Kilmainham, Royal Exchange, South City, South Dock, Trinity, Ushers Quay and Wood Quay Wards, and so much of the townland of Ringsend as is situate in the county borough of Dublin and was not included in the former urban district of Pembroke.	Added Ringsend from Dublin County
1948	—	Constituency abolished	Areas moved to Dublin South-Central, Dublin South-East and Dublin South-West

=== 1981–2016 ===
A new constituency was created by the Electoral (Amendment) Act 1980 and was first used at the 1981 general election. This Dublin South (1981–2016) was one of Ireland's most affluent constituencies. The 2006 census reported that residents tended to have higher-than-average levels of educational attainment, especially in terms of third-level qualifications, and were much more likely to work in professional and managerial positions. "Volatile, unpredictable and utterly ruthless, Dublin South voters have hired and fired TDs with abandon over the years" – The Irish Times description of the constituency in August 2012.

Changes to the Dublin South constituency 1981–2016
Years	TDs	Boundaries	Notes
1981–1992	5	In the county borough of Dublin, the wards of Pembroke East D, Rathfarnham B, Rathfarnham C, Rathfarnham South; and in County Dublin, the district electoral divisions of Dundrum Number One, Dundrum Number Two, Dundrum Number Three, Dundrum Number Four, Dundrum Number Five, Glencullen, Milltown Number One, Milltown Number Two, Rathfarnham Number One, Rathfarnham Number Two, Stillorgan Number One, Whitechurch; and that part of the district electoral division of Tallaght Number One situated south of the centre of the River Dodder.	From the former Dublin County Mid of Pembroke East D and Dundrum Number One from Dublin South-East; Rathfarnham B, Rathfarnham C, Rathfarnham South and Rathfarnham Number One, Rathfarnham Number Two, Whitechurch, and part of Tallaght Number One; From the former Dublin County South Dundrum Number Two, Dundrum Number Three, Dundrum Number Four, Dundrum Number Five, Glencullen, Milltown Number One, Milltown Number Two, part of Stillorgan Number One; and transfer from Dún Laoghaire of remainder of Stillorgan Number One.
1992–1997	5	In the county borough of Dublin the ward of Pembroke East D; and in County Dublin, the district electoral divisions of Ballinteer-Broadford, Ballinteer-Ludford, Ballinteer-Marley, Ballinteer-Meadowbroads, Ballinteer-Meadowmount, Ballinteer-Woodpark, Ballyboden, Blackrock Glenomena, Churchtown-Castle, Churchtown-Landscape, Churchtown-Nutgrove, Churchtown-Orwell, Churchtown-Woodlawn, Clonskeagh-Belfield, Clonskeagh-Farranboley, Clonskeagh-Milltown, Clonskeagh-Roebuck, Clonskeagh-Windy Arbour, Dundrum-Balally, Dundrum-Kilmacud, Dundrum-Sandyford, Dundrum-Sweetmount, Dundrum-Taney, Edmondstown, Firhouse-Ballycullen, Firhouse-Knocklyon, Firhouse-Village, Rathfarnham-Ballyroan, Rathfarnham-Butterfield, Rathfarnham-Hermitage, Rathfarnham-St. Enda's, Rathfarnham Village, Stillorgan-Deerpark, Stillorgan-Kilmacud, Tibradden; and that part of the district electoral division of Glencullen situated west of a line drawn along the Enniskerry Road; and those parts of the district electoral divisions of Stillorgan-Merville and Stillorgan Mount Merrion situated west of a line drawn along the Stillorgan Road; and, in the district electoral division of Bohernabreena, the townlands of Jamestown and Killakee, and those parts of the townlands of Cruagh, Newtown and Woodtown situated within the said district electoral division.	Transfer of the Kilternan-Stepaside area to Dún Laoghaire; New definitions of wards and DEDs.
1997–2002	5	In Dún Laoghaire–Rathdown, the electoral divisions of Ballinteer-Broadford, Ballinteer-Ludford, Ballinteer-Marley, Ballinteer-Meadowbroads, Ballinteer-Meadowmount, Ballinteer-Woodpark, Churchtown-Castle, Churchtown-Landscape, Churchtown-Nutgrove, Churchtown-Orwell, Churchtown-Woodlawn, Clonskeagh-Farranboley, Clonskeagh-Milltown, Clonskeagh-Roebuck, Clonskeagh-Windy Arbour, Dundrum-Balally, Dundrum-Kilmacud, Dundrum-Sandyford, Dundrum-Sweetmount, Dundrum-Taney, Glencullen, Stillorgan-Deerpark, Stillorgan-Kilmacud, Tibradden; and those parts of the electoral divisions of Stillorgan-Merville and Stillorgan-Mount Merrion situated west of a line drawn along the Old Stillorgan Road; In South Dublin, the electoral divisions of Ballyboden, Edmondstown, Firhouse-Ballycullen, Firhouse-Knocklyon, Firhouse Village, Rathfarnham-Ballyroan, Rathfarnham-Butterfield, Rathfarnham-Hermitage, Rathfarnham-St. Enda's, Rathfarnham Village; and, in the electoral division of Bohernabreena, the townlands of Jamestown and Killakee, and those parts of the townlands of Cruagh, Newtown and Woodtown situated within the said electoral division.	Transfer of Pembroke East D and the Belfield/Woodbine/Seafield area to Dublin South-East; transfer of part of Glencullen from Dún Laoghaire. Establishment of new counties and new electoral division definitions.
2002–2007	5	In Dún Laoghaire–Rathdown, the electoral divisions of Ballinteer-Broadford, Ballinteer-Ludford, Ballinteer-Marley, Ballinteer-Meadowbroads, Ballinteer-Meadowmount, Ballinteer-Woodpark, Churchtown-Castle, Churchtown-Landscape, Churchtown-Nutgrove, Churchtown-Orwell, Churchtown-Woodlawn, Clonskeagh-Belfield, Clonskeagh-Farranboley, Clonskeagh-Milltown, Clonskeagh-Roebuck, Clonskeagh-Windy Arbour, Dundrum-Balally, Dundrum-Kilmacud, Dundrum-Sandyford, Dundrum-Sweetmount, Dundrum-Taney, Glencullen, Stillorgan-Deerpark, Stillorgan-Kilmacud, Stillorgan-Merville, Stillorgan-Mount Merrion, Tibradden; and that part of the electoral division of Cabinteely-Loughlinstown situated west of a line drawn along the road from Carrickmines to Kiltiernan; and that part of the electoral division of Stillorgan-Leopardstown situated south-west of a line drawn along the former Harcourt Street-Bray railway line; In South Dublin, the electoral divisions of Ballyboden, Edmondstown, Firhouse-Ballycullen, Firhouse-Knocklyon, Rathfarnham-Ballyroan, Rathfarnham-Butterfield, Rathfarnham-Hermitage, Rathfarnham-St. Enda's, Rathfarnham Village; and that part of the electoral division of Firhouse-Village situated north-east of a line drawn as follows— commencing at the intersection of the eastern boundary of the electoral division at Ballycullen Road by the imaginary south-easterly projection of the rear boundary of the curtilage of number 154 Woodlawn Park Grove, thence commencing in a north-westerly direction and proceeding along the said imaginary projection, the rear boundaries of the curtilages of numbers 154 to 164 Woodlawn Park Grove, and an imaginary line joining the north-western corner of the curtilage of number 164 Woodlawn Park Grove to the south-eastern corner of the curtilage of number 165 Woodlawn Park Grove, thence continuing in a north-westerly direction along the rear boundaries of the curtilages of numbers 165 to 184 Woodlawn Park Grove and an imaginary line joining the north-western corner of the curtilage of number 184 Woodlawn Park Grove and the south-eastern corner of the curtilage of number 1 Woodlawn Park Grove, thence continuing in a north-westerly direction along the south-western boundaries of the curtilages of numbers 1 and 27 Woodlawn Park Grove and along the imaginary north-westerly projection of the said boundary of the curtilage of number 27 Woodlawn Park Grove to its intersection by the pathway west of the front boundaries of the curtilages of numbers 28 to 37 Woodlawn Park Grove, thence commencing in a northerly direction and proceeding along the said pathway to its junction with Firhouse Road, thence commencing in a south-westerly direction and proceeding along Firhouse Road to its junction with the boundary of the townland of Tallaght, thence commencing in a north-easterly direction and proceeding along the boundary of the said townland to its junction with the south-western boundary of the curtilage of Firhouse National School (Scoil Carmel), thence along the imaginary north-westerly projection of the said boundary to its intersection by the north-western boundary of the electoral division at the River Dodder.	Transfer of Belfield area from Dublin South-East; transfer of Stillorgan, Leopardstown and Glenamuck area from Dún Laoghaire; transfer of area around Firhouse and Bohernabreena area to Dublin South-West.
2007–2011	5	In Dún Laoghaire–Rathdown, the electoral divisions of Ballinteer-Broadford, Ballinteer-Ludford, Ballinteer-Marley, Ballinteer-Meadowbroads, Ballinteer-Meadowmount, Ballinteer-Woodpark, Churchtown-Castle, Churchtown-Landscape, Churchtown-Nutgrove, Churchtown-Orwell, Churchtown-Woodlawn, Clonskeagh-Belfield, Clonskeagh-Farranboley, Clonskeagh-Milltown, Clonskeagh-Roebuck, Clonskeagh-Windy Arbour, Dundrum-Balally, Dundrum-Kilmacud, Dundrum-Sandyford, Dundrum-Sweetmount, Dundrum-Taney, Glencullen, Stillorgan-Deerpark, Stillorgan-Kilmacud, Stillorgan-Merville, Stillorgan-Mount Merrion, Tibradden; and that part of the electoral division of Cabinteely-Loughlinstown situated west of a line drawn along the road from Carrickmines to Kiltiernan; and that part of the electoral division of Stillorgan-Leopardstown situated south-west of a line drawn along the former Harcourt Street-Bray railway line; In South Dublin, the electoral divisions of Ballyboden, Edmondstown, Firhouse-Ballycullen, Firhouse-Knocklyon, Rathfarnham-Ballyroan, Rathfarnham-Butterfield, Rathfarnham-Hermitage, Rathfarnham-St. Enda's, Rathfarnham Village.	Transfer of remainder of Firhouse Village to Dublin South-West
2011–2016	5	In Dún Laoghaire–Rathdown, the electoral divisions of Ballinteer-Broadford, Ballinteer-Ludford, Ballinteer-Marley, Ballinteer-Meadowbroads, Ballinteer-Meadowmount, Ballinteer-Woodpark, Cabinteely-Loughlinstown, Churchtown-Castle, Churchtown-Landscape, Churchtown-Nutgrove, Churchtown-Orwell, Churchtown-Woodlawn, Clonskeagh-Belfield, Clonskeagh-Farranboley, Clonskeagh-Milltown, Clonskeagh-Roebuck, Clonskeagh-Windy Arbour, Dundrum-Balally, Dundrum-Kilmacud, Dundrum-Sandyford, Dundrum-Sweetmount, Dundrum-Taney, Foxrock-Carrickmines, Foxrock-Torquay, Glencullen, Stillorgan-Deerpark, Stillorgan-Kilmacud, Stillorgan-Leopardstown, Stillorgan-Merville, Stillorgan-Mount Merrion, Tibradden; In South Dublin, the electoral divisions of Ballyboden, Edmondstown, Firhouse-Ballycullen, Firhouse-Knocklyon, Rathfarnham-Ballyroan, Rathfarnham-Butterfield, Rathfarnham-Hermitage, Rathfarnham-St. Enda's, Rathfarnham Village.	Transfer from Dún Laoghaire of Cabinteely-Loughlinstown (part east of Carrickmines-Kiltiernan road), Foxrock-Carrickmines, Foxrock-Torquay and Stillorgan-Leopardstown (part north-east of former Harcourt Street-Bray railway line).
2016	—	Constituency abolished	Transfer to Dún Laoghaire of Cabinteely-Loughlinstown, Foxrock-Carrickmines, Foxrock-Torquay and Stillorgan-Leopardstown; Transfer to Dublin South-West of Ballyboden, Edmondstown, Firhouse-Ballycullen, Firhouse-Knocklyon, Rathfarnham-Ballyroan, Rathfarnham-Butterfield, Rathfarnham-Hermitage, Rathfarnham-St. Endas and Rathfarnham-Village; with remainder reconstituted as Dublin Rathdown

== TDs ==
=== TDs 1921–1948 ===
Teachtaí Dála (TDs) for Dublin South 1921–1948
Key to parties: CnaG = Cumann na nGaedheal; FF = Fianna Fáil; FG = Fine Gael; Ind. = Independent; Lab = Labour; NL = National League; Rep = Republican; SF = Sinn Féin; PT-SF = Sinn Féin (Pro-Treaty)
Dáil	Election	Deputy (Party)	Deputy (Party)	Deputy (Party)	Deputy (Party)	Deputy (Party)	Deputy (Party)	Deputy (Party)
2nd	1921	Thomas Kelly (SF)	Daniel McCarthy (SF)	Constance Markievicz (SF)	Cathal Ó Murchadha (SF)	4 seats 1921–1923		
3rd	1922	Thomas Kelly (PT-SF)	Daniel McCarthy (PT-SF)	William O'Brien (Lab)	Myles Keogh (Ind.)	4 seats 1921–1923		
4th	1923	Philip Cosgrave (CnaG)	Daniel McCarthy (CnaG)	Constance Markievicz (Rep)	Myles Keogh (Ind.)	Cathal Ó Murchadha (Rep)	Michael Hayes (CnaG)	Peadar Doyle (CnaG)
4th	1923 by-election	Philip Cosgrave (CnaG)	Daniel McCarthy (CnaG)	Constance Markievicz (Rep)	Myles Keogh (Ind.)	Cathal Ó Murchadha (Rep)	Hugh Kennedy (CnaG)	Peadar Doyle (CnaG)
4th	March 1924 by-election	James O'Mara (CnaG)	Daniel McCarthy (CnaG)	Constance Markievicz (Rep)	Myles Keogh (Ind.)	Cathal Ó Murchadha (Rep)	Hugh Kennedy (CnaG)	Peadar Doyle (CnaG)
4th	November 1924 by-election	James O'Mara (CnaG)	Daniel McCarthy (CnaG)	Constance Markievicz (Rep)	Myles Keogh (Ind.)	Cathal Ó Murchadha (Rep)	Seán Lemass (SF)	Peadar Doyle (CnaG)
4th	1925 by-election	James O'Mara (CnaG)	Thomas Hennessy (CnaG)	Constance Markievicz (Rep)	Myles Keogh (Ind.)	Cathal Ó Murchadha (Rep)	Seán Lemass (SF)	Peadar Doyle (CnaG)
5th	1927 (Jun)	James Beckett (CnaG)	Vincent Rice (NL)	Constance Markievicz (FF)	Myles Keogh (Ind.)	Thomas Lawlor (Lab)	Seán Lemass (FF)	Peadar Doyle (CnaG)
5th	1927 by-election	James Beckett (CnaG)	Vincent Rice (NL)	Thomas Hennessy (CnaG)	Myles Keogh (Ind.)	Thomas Lawlor (Lab)	Seán Lemass (FF)	Peadar Doyle (CnaG)
6th	1927 (Sep)	James Beckett (CnaG)	Robert Briscoe (FF)	Thomas Hennessy (CnaG)	Myles Keogh (CnaG)	Frank Kerlin (FF)	Seán Lemass (FF)	Peadar Doyle (CnaG)
7th	1932	James Beckett (CnaG)	Robert Briscoe (FF)	Thomas Hennessy (CnaG)	Myles Keogh (CnaG)	James Lynch (FF)	Seán Lemass (FF)	Peadar Doyle (CnaG)
8th	1933	James Beckett (CnaG)	Robert Briscoe (FF)	James McGuire (CnaG)	Thomas Kelly (FF)	James Lynch (FF)	Seán Lemass (FF)	Peadar Doyle (CnaG)
9th	1937	Myles Keogh (FG)	Robert Briscoe (FF)	Thomas Lawlor (Lab)	Thomas Kelly (FF)	Joseph Hannigan (Ind.)	Seán Lemass (FF)	Peadar Doyle (FG)
10th	1938	James Beckett (FG)	Robert Briscoe (FF)	James Lynch (FF)	Thomas Kelly (FF)	Joseph Hannigan (Ind.)	Seán Lemass (FF)	Peadar Doyle (FG)
10th	1939 by-election	John McCann (FF)	Robert Briscoe (FF)	James Lynch (FF)	Thomas Kelly (FF)	Joseph Hannigan (Ind.)	Seán Lemass (FF)	Peadar Doyle (FG)
11th	1943	Maurice Dockrell (FG)	Robert Briscoe (FF)	James Lynch (FF)	James Larkin Jnr (Lab)	John McCann (FF)	Seán Lemass (FF)	Peadar Doyle (FG)
12th	1944	Maurice Dockrell (FG)	Robert Briscoe (FF)	James Lynch (FF)	James Larkin Jnr (Lab)	John McCann (FF)	Seán Lemass (FF)	Peadar Doyle (FG)
13th	1948	Constituency abolished. See Dublin South-Central, Dublin South-East and Dublin South-West.						

Note: The columns in this table are used only for presentational purposes, and no significance should be attached to the order of columns. For details of the order in which seats were won at each election, see the detailed results of that election.

=== TDs 1981–2016 ===
Note that the boundaries of Dublin South from 1981–2016 share no common territory with the 1921–1948 boundaries. See §History and boundaries

Teachtaí Dála (TDs) for Dublin South 1981–2016
Key to parties: FF = Fianna Fáil; FG = Fine Gael; GP = Green; Ind. = Independent; Lab = Labour; PDs = Progressive Democrats
Dáil	Election	Deputy (Party)	Deputy (Party)	Deputy (Party)	Deputy (Party)	Deputy (Party)
22nd	1981	Niall Andrews (FF)	Séamus Brennan (FF)	Nuala Fennell (FG)	John Kelly (FG)	Alan Shatter (FG)
23rd	1982 (Feb)	Niall Andrews (FF)	Séamus Brennan (FF)	Nuala Fennell (FG)	John Kelly (FG)	Alan Shatter (FG)
24th	1982 (Nov)	Niall Andrews (FF)	Séamus Brennan (FF)	Nuala Fennell (FG)	John Kelly (FG)	Alan Shatter (FG)
25th	1987	Tom Kitt (FF)	Séamus Brennan (FF)	Anne Colley (PDs)	John Kelly (FG)	Alan Shatter (FG)
26th	1989	Tom Kitt (FF)	Séamus Brennan (FF)	Nuala Fennell (FG)	Roger Garland (GP)	Alan Shatter (FG)
27th	1992	Tom Kitt (FF)	Séamus Brennan (FF)	Liz O'Donnell (PDs)	Eithne FitzGerald (Lab)	Alan Shatter (FG)
28th	1997	Tom Kitt (FF)	Séamus Brennan (FF)	Liz O'Donnell (PDs)	Olivia Mitchell (FG)	Alan Shatter (FG)
29th	2002	Tom Kitt (FF)	Séamus Brennan (FF)	Liz O'Donnell (PDs)	Olivia Mitchell (FG)	Eamon Ryan (GP)
30th	2007	Tom Kitt (FF)	Séamus Brennan (FF)	Alan Shatter (FG)	Olivia Mitchell (FG)	Eamon Ryan (GP)
30th	2009 by-election	Tom Kitt (FF)	George Lee (FG)	Alan Shatter (FG)	Olivia Mitchell (FG)	Eamon Ryan (GP)
31st	2011	Shane Ross (Ind.)	Peter Mathews (FG)	Alan Shatter (FG)	Olivia Mitchell (FG)	Alex White (Lab)
32nd	2016	Constituency abolished. See Dublin Rathdown, Dublin South-West and Dún Laoghaire.				

Note: The columns in this table are used only for presentational purposes, and no significance should be attached to the order of columns. For details of the order in which seats were won at each election, see the detailed results of that election.

== Elections ==
*: Outgoing TD

=== 2011 general election ===
2011 general election: Dublin South
Party	Candidate	FPv%	Count							
Party	Candidate	FPv%	1	2	3	4	5	6	7	8
Independent	Shane Ross	23.5	17,075							
Fine Gael	Olivia Mitchell	13.3	9,635	10,454	10,577	10,661	10,763	11,159	11,627	13,379
Fine Gael	Peter Mathews	12.5	9,053	9,805	9,987	10,047	10,173	10,494	10,820	12,070
Labour	Alex White	11.7	8,524	9,319	9,467	9,747	10,407	14,203		
Fine Gael	Alan Shatter	10.6	7,716	8,499	8,580	8,626	8,738	8,966	9,301	10,611
Fianna Fáil	Maria Corrigan	9.4	6,844	7,168	7,332	7,400	7,564	7,762	7,932	9,163
Green	Eamon Ryan	6.8	4,929	5,489	5,626	5,798	6,120	6,536	7,332	
Labour	Aidan Culhane	6.2	4,535	4,839	4,940	5,232	5,691			
Sinn Féin	Sorcha Nic Cormaic	2.6	1,915	2,065	2,186	2,617				
People Before Profit	Nicola Curry (Note: Curry campaigned as a member of the United Left Alliance.)	1.8	1,277	1,455	1,664					
Christian Solidarity	Jane Murphy	0.4	277	296						
Independent	Buhidma Hussein Hamed	0.4	273	318						
Independent	John Doyle	0.3	246	343						
Independent	Gerard Dolan	0.2	156	192						
Independent	Raymond Whitehead	0.2	120	211						
Independent	Eamonn Zaidan	0.1	71	85						
Electorate: 102,387 Valid: 72,646 Spoilt: 459 (0.6%) Quota: 12,108 Turnout: 73,105 (71.4%)

=== 2009 by-election ===
Séamus Brennan died on 9 July 2008. The 2009 Dublin South by-election was held on 5 June 2009.

2009 by-election: Dublin South
Party	Candidate	FPv%	Count
Party	Candidate	FPv%	1
Fine Gael	George Lee	53.4	27,768
Labour	Alex White	19.8	10,294
Fianna Fáil	Shay Brennan	17.8	9,250
Green	Elizabeth Davidson	3.5	1,846
Sinn Féin	Shaun Tracey	3.3	1,705
Independent	Ross O'Mullane	1.2	650
Independent	Frank O'Gorman	0.7	351
Independent	Noel O'Gara	0.3	172
Electorate: 90,802 Valid: 52,036 Spoilt: 443 (0.8%) Quota: 26,019 Turnout: 52,479 (57.8%)

George Lee resigned from the Dáil on 8 February 2010. On 23 June 2010, a Labour Party motion to issue a writ of election to fill the vacancy was opposed by the government, and was defeated by a vote of 66 to 71. On 29 September 2010, a Fine Gael motion to issue the writ was opposed by the government and was defeated by a vote of 77 to 81. On 4 November 2010, a Labour Party motion to issue the writ was opposed by the government and was defeated by a vote of 71 to 76. The seat remained vacant until the dissolution of the 30th Dáil on 1 February 2011.

=== 2007 general election ===
2007 general election: Dublin South
Party	Candidate	FPv%	Count								
Party	Candidate	FPv%	1	2	3	4	5	6	7	8	9
Fianna Fáil	Séamus Brennan	21.8	13,373								
Fine Gael	Olivia Mitchell	13.1	8,037	8,148	8,227	8,236	9,544	9,991	10,846		
Fianna Fáil	Tom Kitt	13.9	8,487	10,124	10,425						
Green	Eamon Ryan	11.1	6,768	6,885	7,483	7,511	7,814	8,379	9,181	11,889	
Fine Gael	Alan Shatter	9.4	5,752	5,820	5,871	5,875	6,658	6,892	7,366	9,456	10,805
Progressive Democrats	Liz O'Donnell	6.6	4,045	4,254	4,328	4,337	4,426	4,520			
Labour	Alex White	5.8	3,575	3,629	3,843	3,854	4,045	5,739	5,962		
Fianna Fáil	Maria Corrigan	5.6	3,438	4,278	4,515	4,655	4,748	4,893	6,816	7,317	7,656
Fine Gael	Jim O'Leary	4.7	2,897	2,928	2,991	2,997					
Labour	Aidan Culhane	4.6	2,809	2,867	3,052	3,069	3,255				
Sinn Féin	Sorcha Nic Cormaic	1.6	992	1,021							
Sinn Féin	Shaun Tracey	1.4	851	864							
Fathers Rights	Liam Ó Gógáin	0.3	180	185							
Electorate: 89,464 Valid: 61,204 Spoilt: 418 (0.7%) Quota: 10,201 Turnout: 61,622 (68.9%)

=== 2002 general election ===
2002 general election: Dublin South
Party	Candidate	FPv%	Count								
Party	Candidate	FPv%	1	2	3	4	5	6	7	8	9
Fianna Fáil	Séamus Brennan	16.9	9,326								
Progressive Democrats	Liz O'Donnell	15.0	8,288	8,344	8,356	8,647	8,816	9,315			
Fianna Fáil	Tom Kitt	14.0	7,744	7,857	7,917	8,117	8,496	10,926			
Fine Gael	Olivia Mitchell	10.1	5,568	5,629	5,633	5,844	5,928	6,142	6,540	11,048	
Fine Gael	Alan Shatter	9.7	5,363	5,410	5,413	5,568	5,653	5,693	5,833		
Labour	Eithne FitzGerald	9.5	5,247	5,400	5,404	5,723	6,077	6,232	6,483	7,108	8,263
Green	Eamon Ryan	9.4	5,222	5,482	5,485	6,161	7,124	7,319	8,019	8,546	9,228
Fianna Fáil	Maria Corrigan	5.8	3,180	3,220	3,245	3,418	3,648				
Sinn Féin	Deirdre Whelan	3.9	2,172	2,345	2,347	2,474					
Ind. Health Alliance	Karen Canning	3.8	2,090	2,207	2,209						
Socialist Party	Lisa Maher	1.9	1,063								
Electorate: 92,645 Valid: 55,263 Spoilt: 427 (0.8%) Quota: 9,211 Turnout: 55,690 (60.1%)

=== 1997 general election ===
1997 general election: Dublin South
Party	Candidate	FPv%	Count							
Party	Candidate	FPv%	1	2	3	4	5	6	7	8
Fianna Fáil	Tom Kitt	17.1	9,904							
Fianna Fáil	Séamus Brennan	15.3	8,861	8,928	9,041	9,187	9,539	12,058		
Fine Gael	Olivia Mitchell	15.1	8,775	8,829	8,837	9,015	9,184	9,342	9,415	10,136
Fine Gael	Alan Shatter	14.0	8,094	8,157	8,165	8,272	8,352	8,556	8,659	9,364
Labour	Eithne FitzGerald	10.6	6,147	6,272	6,280	6,485	6,562	6,667	6,756	8,158
Progressive Democrats	Liz O'Donnell	9.4	5,444	5,491	5,520	5,669	5,784	6,593	8,104	9,070
Fianna Fáil	Ann Ormonde	6.3	3,629	3,683	3,744	3,837	4,091			
Green	Gerry Boland	6.1	3,539	3,780	3,785	4,141	4,432	4,582	4,818	
Independent	Richard Greene	2.5	1,431	1,482	1,485	1,585				
Independent	Christine Buckley	2.2	1,268	1,426	1,430					
Socialist Party	Lisa Maher	1.1	624							
Natural Law	Jack Lyons	0.2	115							
Independent	Johnny Kingsize Doody	0.1	80							
Independent	Gerard P. Dolan	0.1	75							
Electorate: 90,050 Valid: 57,986 Spoilt: 335 (0.6%) Quota: 9,665 Turnout: 58,321 (64.8%)

=== 1992 general election ===
1992 general election: Dublin South
Party	Candidate	FPv%	Count											
Party	Candidate	FPv%	1	2	3	4	5	6	7	8	9	10	11	12
Labour	Eithne FitzGerald	28.9	17,256											
Fianna Fáil	Séamus Brennan	15.2	9,074	9,514	9,531	9,587	9,627	9,687	10,001					
Fianna Fáil	Tom Kitt	12.3	7,304	7,891	7,900	7,969	8,014	8,079	8,303	11,005				
Fine Gael	Alan Shatter	10.5	6,244	7,494	7,503	7,513	7,580	7,862	7,938	8,118	8,303	8,309	9,657	10,685
Progressive Democrats	Liz O'Donnell	8.7	5,162	6,240	6,249	6,270	6,317	6,603	6,777	6,979	7,225	7,235	7,617	8,790
Fianna Fáil	Ann Ormonde	5.2	3,085	3,287	3,291	3,320	3,333	3,377	3,623					
Fine Gael	Maurice Manning	5.1	3,065	3,677	3,682	3,693	3,716	3,786	3,902	3,952	4,062	4,071		
Fine Gael	Olivia Mitchell	4.6	2,764	3,584	3,589	3,598	3,641	3,763	3,864	3,974	4,098	4,106	6,188	7,012
Green	Roger Garland	3.8	2,258	3,086	3,089	3,218	3,303	3,908	4,365	4,516	4,916	4,944	5,047	
Independent	Richard Greene	2.8	1,671	1,854	1,870	1,946	2,180	2,324						
Democratic Left	Marian White	1.1	640	1,770	1,774	1,827	1,860							
Independent	Owen Connolly	0.9	506	588	645	674								
Sinn Féin	George Robert Keegan	0.8	486	561	566									
Independent	Kevin Stewart Blair	0.2	119	148										
Electorate: 85,553 Valid: 59,634 Spoilt: 605 (1.0%) Quota: 9,940 Turnout: 60,239 (70.4%)

=== 1989 general election ===
1989 general election: Dublin South
Party	Candidate	FPv%	Count							
Party	Candidate	FPv%	1	2	3	4	5	6	7	8
Fianna Fáil	Séamus Brennan	25.7	13,927							
Fine Gael	Alan Shatter	14.7	7,969	8,143	8,205	8,275	9,382			
Fianna Fáil	Tom Kitt	13.3	7,217	10,669						
Fine Gael	Nuala Fennell	9.2	4,983	5,088	5,105	5,153	6,340	6,779	7,045	8,337
Green	Roger Garland	8.8	4,771	4,900	4,939	5,372	5,451	6,485	6,500	8,832
Progressive Democrats	Anne Colley	8.5	4,607	4,814	4,846	4,906	5,192	5,720	5,776	6,717
Labour	Eithne FitzGerald	7.6	4,134	4,233	4,258	4,927	5,026	5,461	5,478	
Fine Gael	Olivia Mitchell	5.1	2,786	2,822	2,834	2,860				
Fianna Fáil	Ann Ormonde	4.3	2,328	3,003	4,446	4,518	4,581			
Workers' Party	Eamonn O'Liatháin	2.7	1,440	1,462	1,473					
Electorate: 82,936 Valid: 54,162 Quota: 9,028 Turnout: 65.3%

=== 1987 general election ===
1987 general election: Dublin South
Party	Candidate	FPv%	Count												
Party	Candidate	FPv%	1	2	3	4	5	6	7	8	9	10	11	12	13
Progressive Democrats	Anne Colley	20.9	11,957												
Fianna Fáil	Séamus Brennan	17.3	9,940												
Fianna Fáil	Tom Kitt	14.7	8,423	8,640	8,929	8,954	8,959	8,983	9,023	9,240	9,536	9,794			
Fine Gael	John Kelly	12.6	7,247	7,975	7,986	7,999	8,015	8,035	8,045	8,093	8,317	8,599	8,620	8,877	9,829
Fine Gael	Alan Shatter	10.0	5,720	6,203	6,210	6,212	6,223	6,234	6,250	6,303	6,427	6,666	6,683	6,851	7,931
Fine Gael	Nuala Fennell	8.3	4,737	5,269	5,277	5,278	5,287	5,295	5,310	5,365	5,508	5,720	5,731	5,881	7,171
Labour	Eithne FitzGerald	4.7	2,684	2,833	2,841	2,847	2,857	2,864	2,883	3,340	3,603	4,242	4,263	4,772	
Fianna Fáil	Ann Ormonde	3.7	2,133	2,183	2,234	2,241	2,252	2,257	2,273	2,337	2,403	2,549	2,691		
Green	Roger Garland	2.4	1,377	1,455	1,457	1,466	1,483	1,506	1,560	1,824	2,155				
Workers' Party	Eamonn Ó Liathain	2.3	1,308	1,347	1,350	1,352	1,357	1,373	1,400	1,566					
Independent	Mairead Duchon	2.2	1,253	1,338	1,342	1,363	1,384	1,415	1,437						
Independent	Thomas Sharkey	0.3	189	203	204	213	222	240							
Independent	Padraig O'Neill	0.3	142	154	154	163	170								
Independent	Barbara Hyland	0.2	114	125	125	127									
Independent	Martin MacFeorais	0.2	107	110	110										
Electorate: 77,519 Valid: 57,331 Quota: 9,556 Turnout: 73.9%

=== November 1982 general election ===
November 1982 general election: Dublin South
Party	Candidate	FPv%	Count							
Party	Candidate	FPv%	1	2	3	4	5	6	7	8
Fine Gael	John Kelly	18.6	9,774							
Fine Gael	Alan Shatter	14.6	7,655	8,147	8,189	8,362	8,372	8,503	9,973	
Fianna Fáil	Séamus Brennan	13.8	7,219	7,244	7,263	7,341	7,752	7,814	7,895	7,986
Fine Gael	Nuala Fennell	13.6	7,106	7,418	7,447	7,618	7,634	7,766	9,124	
Fianna Fáil	Niall Andrews	12.6	6,597	6,602	6,620	6,672	7,224	7,272	7,342	7,388
Fianna Fáil	Tom Kitt	7.7	4,009	4,016	4,032	4,081	4,415	4,473	4,577	4,647
Fine Gael	Thomas Hand	5.6	2,959	3,133	3,145	3,221	3,236	3,317		
Labour	Eithne FitzGerald	4.6	2,388	2,400	2,559	2,789	2,807	4,426	4,611	5,498
Labour	Frank Buckley	3.7	1,911	1,917	1,998	2,127	2,150			
Fianna Fáil	Ruairí Brugha	2.6	1,353	1,355	1,358	1,391				
Green	Roger Garland	1.8	950	953	1,051					
Democratic Socialist	Denis O'Connor	0.9	479	481						
Electorate: 71,755 Valid: 52,400 Quota: 8,734 Turnout: 73.0%

=== February 1982 general election ===
February 1982 general election: Dublin South
Party	Candidate	FPv%	Count						
Party	Candidate	FPv%	1	2	3	4	5	6	7
Fine Gael	John Kelly	21.0	10,809						
Fianna Fáil	Séamus Brennan	15.6	8,055	8,107	8,176	9,555			
Fine Gael	Alan Shatter	13.2	6,779	7,790	8,878				
Fine Gael	Nuala Fennell	11.3	5,799	6,488	7,578	7,729	7,766	11,554	
Fianna Fáil	Niall Andrews	9.6	4,936	4,951	5,018	5,904	6,667	7,168	8,612
Fianna Fáil	Síle de Valera	9.4	4,843	4,850	4,895	5,550	5,702	6,010	6,356
Labour	John Horgan	8.9	4,589	4,705	5,048	5,188	5,215		
Fianna Fáil	Tom Kitt	6.1	3,133	3,150	3,249				
Fine Gael	Thomas Hand	4.9	2,511	2,837					
Electorate: 69,195 Valid: 51,454 Spoilt: 312 (0.6%) Quota: 8,576 Turnout: 51,766 (74.8%)

=== 1981 general election ===
1981 general election: Dublin South
Party	Candidate	FPv%	Count								
Party	Candidate	FPv%	1	2	3	4	5	6	7	8	9
Fine Gael	John Kelly	15.7	7,964	8,057	8,073	8,132	8,180	8,187	9,000		
Fianna Fáil	Séamus Brennan	15.3	7,779	7,838	7,861	7,904	8,862				
Fianna Fáil	Niall Andrews	11.2	5,690	5,732	5,752	5,777	6,522	6,796	6,943	7,090	7,421
Fianna Fáil	Síle de Valera	10.6	5,408	5,444	5,464	5,496	6,066	6,146	6,241	6,320	6,621
Fine Gael	Alan Shatter	9.4	4,762	4,942	4,963	5,045	5,134	5,143	5,557	7,226	8,866
Fine Gael	Nuala Fennell	8.9	4,527	4,614	4,654	4,819	4,901	4,912	5,470	7,288	9,304
Fine Gael	Alexis FitzGerald	6.9	3,495	3,549	3,577	3,620	3,652	3,655	4,179		
Labour	John Horgan	5.9	3,004	3,152	3,392	4,488	4,558	4,564	4,808	5,121	
Fianna Fáil	Tom Kitt	5.2	2,636	2,666	2,679	2,703					
Fine Gael	Thomas Hand	5.2	2,621	2,655	2,682	2,758	2,849	2,853			
Labour	Eithne FitzGerald	2.5	1,258	1,367	1,661						
Labour	Frank Buckley	1.4	711	750							
Independent	Norman Simpson	1.2	616								
Socialist Party	Denis O'Connor	0.7	335								
Electorate: 69,195 Valid: 50,806 Quota: 8,468 Turnout: 73.4%

=== 1944 general election ===
Full figures for the second count to the eighth count are unavailable. Byrne, Bourke and Hannigan all lost their deposits.

1944 general election: Dublin South
Party	Candidate	FPv%	Count								
Party	Candidate	FPv%	1	2	3	4	5	6	7	8	9
Fianna Fáil	Seán Lemass	31.3	15,385								
Fine Gael	Peadar Doyle	11.1	5,442	5,667	N/A	N/A	N/A	N/A	6,565		
Fine Gael	Maurice E. Dockrell	8.9	4,355	4,419	N/A	N/A	N/A	N/A	N/A	N/A	6,051
Fianna Fáil	John McCann	8.8	4,323	6,602							
Labour	James Larkin Jnr	7.3	3,587	3,849	N/A	N/A	N/A	N/A	N/A	N/A	6,658
Labour	Walter Beirne	7.3	3,571	3,686	N/A						
Fianna Fáil	Andrew Clarkin	6.8	3,328	4,389	N/A	N/A	N/A	N/A	N/A	N/A	5,238
Fianna Fáil	James B. Lynch	6.4	3,148	6,085	6,332						
Fianna Fáil	Robert Briscoe	5.8	2,852	4,935	N/A	N/A	N/A	N/A	N/A	N/A	6,029
Independent	Joseph Hannigan	3.7	1,824	1,983	N/A						
Fine Gael	Thomas Bourke	1.4	689	711	N/A						
Fine Gael	Michael Byrne	1.4	674	704	N/A						
Electorate: 81,004 Valid: 49,178 Quota: 6,148 Turnout: 60.7%

=== 1943 general election ===
Full figures for the second to the fifteenth counts are unavailable. Dowling, Donnelly, Hynes, Sheehy-Skeffington, Rice, Keogh, Hosey and O'Higgins all lost their deposits.

1943 general election: Dublin South
Party	Candidate	FPv%	Count															
Party	Candidate	FPv%	1	2	3	4	5	6	7	8	9	10	11	12	13	14	15	16
Fianna Fáil	Seán Lemass	30.9	16,399															
Fine Gael	Peadar Doyle	9.4	4,971	N/A	N/A	N/A	N/A	N/A	N/A	N/A	N/A	7,078						
Labour	Walter Beirne	6.3	3,326	N/A	N/A	N/A	N/A	N/A	N/A	N/A	N/A	N/A	N/A	N/A	N/A	N/A	N/A	5,360
Fianna Fáil	John McCann	5.9	3,133	N/A	N/A	N/A	N/A	N/A	N/A	N/A	N/A	N/A	7,180					
Fianna Fáil	Robert Briscoe	5.9	3,127	N/A	N/A	N/A	N/A	N/A	N/A	N/A	N/A	N/A	N/A	N/A	6,678			
Labour	James Larkin Jnr	5.7	3,049	N/A	N/A	N/A	N/A	N/A	N/A	N/A	N/A	N/A	N/A	N/A	N/A	N/A	N/A	5,606
Fine Gael	Maurice E. Dockrell	5.3	2,841	N/A	N/A	N/A	N/A	N/A	N/A	N/A	N/A	N/A	N/A	N/A	N/A	6,887		
Fianna Fáil	James B. Lynch	5.0	2,666	N/A	N/A	N/A	N/A	N/A	N/A	N/A	N/A	N/A	6,683					
Labour	Joseph Hannigan	4.4	2,345															
Fianna Fáil	Peter White	3.1	1,639															
Fine Gael	Patrick Cahill	2.9	1,525															
Fine Gael	Tom O'Higgins	2.8	1,461															
Fine Gael	Edward D. Hosey	2.4	1,280															
Fine Gael	Myles Keogh	2.2	1,152															
Independent	Vincent Rice	2.1	1,104															
Independent	Hanna Sheehy-Skeffington	1.7	917															
Labour	Owen Hynes	1.6	873															
Córas na Poblachta	Simon Donnelly	1.5	820															
Córas na Poblachta	Seán Dowling	0.9	494															
Electorate: 81,004 Valid: 53,122 Quota: 6,641 Turnout: 65.6%

=== 1939 by-election ===
Following the death of Fine Gael TD James Beckett, a by-election was held on 6 June 1939. The seat was won by the Fianna Fáil candidate John McCann.

1939 by-election: Dublin South
Party	Candidate	FPv%	Count
Party	Candidate	FPv%	1
Fianna Fáil	John McCann	55.8	20,059
Fine Gael	Patrick Cahill	44.2	15,877
Electorate: 80,961 Valid: 35,936 Quota: 17,969 Turnout: 44.4%

=== 1938 general election ===
1938 general election: Dublin South
Party	Candidate	FPv%	Count									
Party	Candidate	FPv%	1	2	3	4	5	6	7	8	9	10
Fianna Fáil	Seán Lemass	25.7	14,151									
Fine Gael	Peadar Doyle	12.5	6,877	7,022								
Fianna Fáil	John McCann	8.7	4,806	5,552	5,561	5,587	5,608	5,739	5,947	6,015	6,086	6,187
Fine Gael	James Beckett	8.5	4,681	4,743	4,747	4,763	4,968	4,997	5,272	8,564		
Fianna Fáil	James B. Lynch	8.0	4,401	5,713	5,725	5,766	5,784	5,919	6,450	6,567	6,663	6,791
Independent	Joseph Hannigan	7.0	3,850	4,064	4,082	4,120	4,185	4,253	5,397	6,114	7,464	
Fianna Fáil	Robert Briscoe	6.9	3,791	5,883	5,921	5,937	5,951	6,024	6,273	6,382	6,473	6,544
Fine Gael	Myles Keogh	6.8	3,760	3,837	3,848	3,876	4,287	4,329	4,722			
Fianna Fáil	Thomas Kelly	6.6	3,619	5,852	5,868	5,886	5,902	5,995	6,442	6,614	6,684	6,806
Labour	Thomas Lawlor	5.2	2,845	2,970	2,983	3,124	3,150	3,997				
Labour	Eamonn Lynch	2.0	1,076	1,292	1,298	1,445	1,456					
Fine Gael	Thomas O'Byrne	1.4	765	779	784	801						
Labour	Elizabeth O'Connor	0.8	460	489	493							
Electorate: 82,366 Valid: 55,082 Quota: 6,886 Turnout: 66.9%

=== 1937 general election ===
1937 general election: Dublin South
Party	Candidate	FPv%	Count											
Party	Candidate	FPv%	1	2	3	4	5	6	7	8	9	10	11	12
Fianna Fáil	Seán Lemass	28.0	15,969											
Fine Gael	Peadar Doyle	10.4	5,941	6,089	6,101	6,431	6,447	6,491	7,064	7,122	7,130			
Fine Gael	James Beckett	8.1	4,623	4,665	4,677	4,785	4,793	4,802	5,205	5,218	5,223	5,225	5,498	5,587
Independent	Joseph Hannigan	7.1	4,031	4,247	4,295	4,403	4,433	4,491	4,600	4,740	4,756	4,762	5,897	6,635
Fine Gael	Myles Keogh	7.0	3,973	4,037	4,042	4,230	4,244	4,294	5,137	5,161	5,165	5,169	5,639	5,808
Labour	Thomas Lawlor	6.8	3,872	4,088	4,301	4,330	4,387	5,703	5,743	5,857	5,878	5,889	6,459	7,206
Fianna Fáil	Robert Briscoe	5.8	3,315	6,082	6,177	6,216	6,467	6,530	6,540	7,427				
Fianna Fáil	Thomas Kelly	4.9	2,815	5,613	5,704	5,730	6,086	6,175	6,187	7,283				
Independent	Patrick Medlar	4.3	2,474	2,670	2,705	2,735	2,818	2,895	3,016	3,106	3,119	3,126		
Fianna Fáil	John McCann	3.6	2,058	2,685	2,739	2,747	3,224	3,322	3,347	3,743	3,976	4,102	4,392	
Fine Gael	James McGuire	3.5	2,000	2,022	2,037	2,143	2,149	2,174						
Fianna Fáil	Denis Healy	3.1	1,774	2,576	2,624	2,637	2,834	2,881	2,891					
Labour	John McCabe	2.7	1,523	1,639	1,827	1,847	1,905							
Fine Gael	Michael Byrne	1.8	999	1,020	1,027									
Independent	Frank Ryan	1.5	875	914										
Fianna Fáil	Ralph Lynch	1.4	771	1,539	1,569	1,575								
Electorate: 82,659 Valid: 57,013 Quota: 7,127 Turnout: 69.0%

=== 1933 general election ===
1933 general election: Dublin South
Party	Candidate	FPv%	Count							
Party	Candidate	FPv%	1	2	3	4	5	6	7	8
Fianna Fáil	Seán Lemass	24.2	14,716							
Cumann na nGaedheal	James Beckett	13.8	8,364							
Cumann na nGaedheal	James McGuire	12.2	7,414	7,444	7,538	7,543	8,060			
Cumann na nGaedheal	Peadar Doyle	9.7	5,920	5,973	6,348	6,359	7,015	7,175	7,293	7,415
Fianna Fáil	Robert Briscoe	8.1	4,894	8,275						
Fianna Fáil	Thomas Kelly	8.0	4,831	6,614	6,620	6,889	6,961	6,967	8,939	
Fianna Fáil	James B. Lynch	7.6	4,642	6,075	6,079	6,311	6,353	6,354	7,609	
Cumann na nGaedheal	Myles Keogh	7.0	4,259	4,323	4,441	4,444	6,113	6,405	6,470	6,551
Fianna Fáil	Denis Healy	4.8	2,888	3,219	3,230	3,383	3,444	3,449		
Cumann na nGaedheal	Thomas Hennessy	4.7	2,837	2,882	3,042	3,048				
Electorate: 81,224 Valid: 60,765 Quota: 7,596 Turnout: 74.8%

=== 1932 general election ===
1932 general election: Dublin South
Party	Candidate	FPv%	Count											
Party	Candidate	FPv%	1	2	3	4	5	6	7	8	9	10	11	12
Fianna Fáil	Seán Lemass	18.9	10,426											
Cumann na nGaedheal	James Beckett	13.4	7,381											
Cumann na nGaedheal	Myles Keogh	10.9	5,985	6,005	6,078	6,083	6,122	6,129	6,362	6,607	7,120			
Fianna Fáil	Robert Briscoe	10.3	5,676	7,524										
Cumann na nGaedheal	Peadar Doyle	9.4	5,196	5,210	5,252	5,256	5,279	5,291	5,540	5,852	6,408	6,470	8,530	
Cumann na nGaedheal	Thomas Hennessy	7.0	3,832	3,847	3,922	3,926	3,953	3,961	4,135	4,437	4,919	5,033	6,887	
Cumann na nGaedheal	Eugene Davy	6.3	3,478	3,489	3,754	3,758	3,780	3,788	3,911	4,087	4,407	4,444		
Fianna Fáil	James B. Lynch	5.7	3,162	3,772	3,775	4,047	4,273	4,494	4,545	5,118	5,627	5,638	5,750	6,007
Independent	Patrick Medlar	4.5	2,490	2,572	2,578	2,588	2,690	2,709	2,773	3,304				
Fianna Fáil	Eoghan O'Rahilly	4.4	2,440	3,056	3,058	3,262	3,445	4,176	4,240	4,553	5,079	5,091	5,198	5,311
Labour	Thomas Lawlor	3.4	1,898	1,951	1,955	1,960	2,098	2,110	2,757					
Labour	Richard Hennessy	2.8	1,536	1,554	1,578	1,586	1,634	1,638						
Independent	James Larkin Jnr	1.7	917	959	961	971								
Fianna Fáil	Frank O'Donnell	1.2	650	863	864	978	1,070							
Electorate: 79,558 Valid: 55,067 Quota: 6,884 Turnout: 69.2%

=== September 1927 general election ===
September 1927 general election: Dublin South
Party	Candidate	FPv%	Count									
Party	Candidate	FPv%	1	2	3	4	5	6	7	8	9	10
Fianna Fáil	Seán Lemass	20.7	11,240									
Cumann na nGaedheal	Thomas Hennessy	17.3	9,400									
Cumann na nGaedheal	James Beckett	13.5	7,362									
Fianna Fáil	Robert Briscoe	10.2	5,570	8,132								
Cumann na nGaedheal	Peadar Doyle	8.5	4,642	4,666	5,307	5,563	5,573	5,697	5,828	6,757	8,175	
Cumann na nGaedheal	Vincent Rice	6.8	3,678	3,719	4,211	4,307	4,313	4,342	4,492			
Labour	Thomas Lawlor	6.7	3,662	3,885	3,951	3,959	3,993	4,123	4,679	4,925	5,001	5,377
Cumann na nGaedheal	Myles Keogh	6.5	3,522	3,573	4,900	5,048	5,048	5,152	5,397	8,308		
Independent	John Lawlor (Note: John Lawlor, president of the Workers' Union of Ireland and a member of Jim Larkin's Irish Worker League, ran as an Independent Labour)	5.3	2,857	3,070	3,106	3,112	3,166	3,371				
Fianna Fáil	Frank Kerlin	2.4	1,320	2,239	2,254	2,257	2,727	4,359	6,052	6,117	6,134	6,204
Fianna Fáil	Andrew Clarkin	2.1	1,116	1,526	1,552	1,600	2,361					
Electorate: 79,639 Valid: 54,369 Quota: 6,797 Turnout: 68.3%

=== 1927 by-election ===
Fianna Fáil TD Constance Markievicz died on 15 July 1927. The by-election was held on 24 August 1927.

1927 by-election: Dublin South
Party	Candidate	FPv%	Count
Party	Candidate	FPv%	1
Cumann na nGaedheal	Thomas Hennessy	55.0	24,139
Fianna Fáil	Robert Briscoe	42.5	18,647
Sinn Féin	Cathal Ó Murchadha	2.5	1,115
Electorate: 81,136 Valid: 43,901 Quota: 21,951 Turnout: 54.1%

=== June 1927 general election ===
June 1927 general election: Dublin South
Party	Candidate	FPv%	Count											
Party	Candidate	FPv%	1	2	3	4	5	6	7	8	9	10	11	12
Fianna Fáil	Seán Lemass	16.1	8,547											
Cumann na nGaedheal	James Beckett	15.5	8,183											
National League	Vincent Rice	12.4	6,575	6,608	6,692									
Independent	Myles Keogh	10.0	5,290	5,329	5,478	5,568	5,675	5,701	5,769	6,078	6,395	6,691		
Cumann na nGaedheal	Peadar Doyle	8.4	4,428	4,441	5,242	5,278	5,652	5,652	5,677	5,921	6,013	6,191	8,789	
Fianna Fáil	Constance Markievicz	7.6	4,026	5,089	5,102	5,138	5,145	5,145	5,622	5,779	6,687			
Labour	Thomas Lawlor	5.3	2,826	2,868	2,890	3,175	3,213	3,215	3,274	4,398	4,648	4,917	5,157	6,209
Cumann na nGaedheal	John O'Neill	4.8	2,555	2,563	2,804	2,837	3,212	3,255	3,280	3,358	3,491	3,549		
Sinn Féin	Cathal Ó Murchadha	4.2	2,211	2,331	2,334	2,351	2,383	2,383	2,441	2,494	2,796	3,835	3,948	4,103
Independent	Michael O'Mullane	4.0	2,121	2,233	2,240	2,302	2,323	2,323	2,364	2,436				
Labour	Seán Campbell	3.4	1,825	1,845	1,904	2,114	2,145	2,146	2,163					
Fianna Fáil	Robert Briscoe	3.2	1,705	1,948	2,037	2,045	2,056	2,056	2,409	2,450	2,668			
Cumann na nGaedheal	Patrick Morgan	1.7	921	933	1,017	1,032								
Fianna Fáil	Denis Healy	1.7	918	1,128	1,134	1,142	1,150	1,150						
Labour	Thomas Nagle	1.6	821	833	838									
Electorate: 79,639 Valid: 52,952 Quota: 6,620 Turnout: 66.5%

=== 1925 by-election ===
Following the resignation of Cumann na nGaedheal TD Daniel McCarthy, a by-election was held on 11 March 1925. The seat was won by the Cumann na nGaedheal candidate Thomas Hennessy.

1925 by-election: Dublin South
Party	Candidate	FPv%	Count
Party	Candidate	FPv%	1
Cumann na nGaedheal	Thomas Hennessy	57.0	24,075
Republican	Michael O'Mullane	32.9	13,900
Labour	Thomas Lawlor	10.0	4,237
Electorate: 78,353 Valid: 42,212 Quota: 21,107 Turnout: 53.9%

=== November 1924 by-election ===
Following the appointment of Cumann na nGaedheal TD Hugh Kennedy as Chief Justice, a by-election was held on 18 November 1924. The seat was won by the Republican candidate Seán Lemass.

November 1924 by-election: Dublin South
Party	Candidate	FPv%	Count
Party	Candidate	FPv%	1
Republican	Seán Lemass	51.4	17,297
Cumann na nGaedheal	Séamus Hughes	48.6	16,340
Electorate: 78,682 Valid: 33,637 Quota: 16,819 Turnout: 42.8%

=== March 1924 by-election ===
Cumann na nGaedheal TD Philip Cosgrave died on 22 October 1923. The by-election was held on 12 March 1924. The seat was won by the Cumann na nGaedheal candidate James O'Mara.

March 1924 by-election: Dublin South
Party	Candidate	FPv%	Count	
Party	Candidate	FPv%	1	2
Cumann na nGaedheal	James O'Mara	49.0	15,884	17,193
Republican	Seán Lemass	42.0	13,639	13,942
Independent	John O'Neill	9.0	2,928	
Electorate: 76,882 Valid: 32,451 Quota: 16,226 Turnout: 42.2%

=== 1923 by-election ===
Michael Hayes was also elected for the National University constituency and resigned his seat in Dublin South when the Dáil met on 19 September 1923. A by-election was held on 25 October, won by Cumann na nGaedheal candidate Hugh Kennedy.

1923 by-election: Dublin South
Party	Candidate	FPv%	Count
Party	Candidate	FPv%	1
Cumann na nGaedheal	Hugh Kennedy	67.3	23,676
Republican	Michael O'Mullane	32.7	11,502
Electorate: 78,017 Valid: 35,178 Quota: 17,590 Turnout: 45.1%

=== 1923 general election ===
1923 general election: Dublin South
Party	Candidate	FPv%	Count																		
Party	Candidate	FPv%	1	2	3	4	5	6	7	8	9	10	11	12	13	14	15	16	17	18	19
Cumann na nGaedheal	Philip Cosgrave	34.7	16,011																		
Republican	Constance Markievicz	12.6	5,832																		
Cumann na nGaedheal	Daniel McCarthy	9.9	4,565	6,596																	
Independent	Myles Keogh	6.5	3,010	3,787	3,789	3,854	3,907	3,907	3,942	3,997	4,033	4,164	4,185	4,415	4,581	4,861	5,321	5,840			
Cumann na nGaedheal	Michael Hayes	6.0	2,778	4,605	4,606	4,930	4,986	4,987	5,001	5,100	5,118	5,312	5,322	5,565	6,406						
Independent	Andrew Beattie	5.3	2,451	2,691	2,691	2,699	2,746	2,746	2,748	2,782	2,868	2,943	2,949	2,982	3,012	3,088	3,167	3,772	3,827	3,958	4,010
Republican	Cathal Ó Murchadha	4.1	1,893	1,911	1,940	1,942	1,964	1,964	1,980	1,988	1,989	2,000	2,239	2,312	2,328	2,339	2,431	2,482	2,486	2,800	4,500
Cumann na nGaedheal	Peadar Doyle	3.1	1,409	5,563	5,565	5,761	5,772														
Republican	Michael O'Mullane	2.9	1,315	1,320	1,332	1,333	1,339	1,339	1,355	1,358	1,360	1,388	1,807	1,886	1,892	1,896	2,000	2,025	2,027	2,229	
Labour	William O'Brien	2.0	933	1,030	1,031	1,046	1,055	1,055	1,067	1,075	1,080	1,125	1,136								
Independent	Patrick Medlar	1.8	832	1,060	1,062	1,109	1,120	1,120	1,145	1,205	1,212	1,292	1,314	1,404	1,440	1,491					
Dublin Trades Council	John Farrelly	1.8	808	1,004	1,008	1,014	1,018	1,018	1,264	1,386	1,389	1,408	1,425	1,547	1,574	1,599	1,767	1,808	1,816		
Independent	William McCabe	1.7	793	933	933	956	987	987	991	1,004	1,337	1,392	1,398	1,472	1,517	1,585	1,700				
Cumann na nGaedheal	George Lyons	1.6	717	976	976	1,087	1,091	1,091	1,096	1,113	1,117	1,153	1,156	1,239							
Republican	Edward O'Kelly	1.5	709	721	728	730	732	732	741	748	753	771									
Independent	Bernard Shields	1.3	582	667	667	677	682	682	706	717	742										
Independent	James Shanks	1.1	484	512	512	514	525	525	531	535											
Dublin Trades Council	Edward Tucker	0.9	391	425	425	430	430	430													
Independent	Laurence Byrne	0.8	385	473	473	478	483	483	487												
Independent	Patrick Munden	0.6	265	286	287	290															
Electorate: 78,017 Valid: 46,163 Quota: 5,771 Turnout: 59.2%

=== 1922 general election ===
Kenneth Reddin, an election agent, published a sample ballot incorrectly stating that voters had only six preferences. Markievicz secured an injunction in the Republican Supreme Court against Reddin, who published an apology on election day in The Irish Times. The official notice of poll listed Markievicz's name first, but the ballot (and Reddin's sample) listed her third. She later complained that the electoral register was "rotten".

1922 general election: Dublin South
Party	Candidate	FPv%	Count				
Party	Candidate	FPv%	1	2	3	4	5
Sinn Féin (Pro-Treaty)	Daniel McCarthy	21.1	5,540				
Labour	William O'Brien	18.0	4,734	4,764	4,890	5,091	5,543
Independent	Myles Keogh	16.6	4,363	4,403	4,489	6,236	
Sinn Féin (Pro-Treaty)	Thomas Kelly	16.5	4,344	4,488	4,885	5,012	5,525
Sinn Féin (Anti-Treaty)	Constance Markievicz	15.0	3,951	3,971	4,663	4,675	4,684
Independent	Sir John O'Connell	7.9	2,068	2,079	2,106		
Sinn Féin (Anti-Treaty)	Cathal Ó Murchadha	5.0	1,308	1,341			
Electorate: 41,466 Valid: 26,308 Quota: 5,262 Turnout: 63.4%

=== 1921 general election ===
1921 general election: Dublin South (uncontested)
Party	Candidate
Sinn Féin	Thomas Kelly
Sinn Féin	Daniel McCarthy
Sinn Féin	Constance Markievicz
Sinn Féin	Cathal Ó Murchadha

== See also ==
- Dáil constituencies
- Politics of the Republic of Ireland
- Historic Dáil constituencies
- Elections in the Republic of Ireland
