= Joseph Hannigan =

Irish politician (1904–1957)

Senator
- In office 8 September 1943 – 18 August 1944
- Constituency: Administrative Panel

Teachta Dála
- In office July 1937 – June 1943
- Constituency: Dublin South

Personal details
- Born: 5 July 1904 Dublin, Ireland
- Died: 14 April 1957 (aged 52) Dublin, Ireland
- Party: Independent; Labour Party

Joseph Hannigan (5 July 1904 – 14 April 1957) was an Irish politician and medical practitioner. Hannigan was first elected to Dáil Éireann as an independent Teachta Dála (TD) for the Dublin South constituency at the 1937 general election. He was re-elected at the 1938 general election, and in 1939 he joined the Labour Party.

He lost his seat at the 1943 general election. He left the Labour Party in 1943. He was subsequently elected to the 4th Seanad in 1943 by the Administrative Panel. He did not contest the 1944 Seanad election.

| Dáil | Election | Deputy (Party) | Deputy (Party) | Deputy (Party) | Deputy (Party) | Deputy (Party) | Deputy (Party) | Deputy (Party) |
|---|---|---|---|---|---|---|---|---|
| 2nd | 1921 | Thomas Kelly (SF) | Daniel McCarthy (SF) | Constance Markievicz (SF) | Cathal Ó Murchadha (SF) | 4 seats 1921–1923 | | |
| 3rd | 1922 | Thomas Kelly (PT-SF) | Daniel McCarthy (PT-SF) | William O'Brien (Lab) | Myles Keogh (Ind.) | 4 seats 1921–1923 | | |
| 4th | 1923 | Philip Cosgrave (CnaG) | Daniel McCarthy (CnaG) | Constance Markievicz (Rep) | Myles Keogh (Ind.) | Cathal Ó Murchadha (Rep) | Michael Hayes (CnaG) | Peadar Doyle (CnaG) |
| 4th | 1923 by-election | Philip Cosgrave (CnaG) | Daniel McCarthy (CnaG) | Constance Markievicz (Rep) | Myles Keogh (Ind.) | Cathal Ó Murchadha (Rep) | Hugh Kennedy (CnaG) | Peadar Doyle (CnaG) |
| 4th | March 1924 by-election | James O'Mara (CnaG) | Daniel McCarthy (CnaG) | Constance Markievicz (Rep) | Myles Keogh (Ind.) | Cathal Ó Murchadha (Rep) | Hugh Kennedy (CnaG) | Peadar Doyle (CnaG) |
| 4th | November 1924 by-election | James O'Mara (CnaG) | Daniel McCarthy (CnaG) | Constance Markievicz (Rep) | Myles Keogh (Ind.) | Cathal Ó Murchadha (Rep) | Seán Lemass (SF) | Peadar Doyle (CnaG) |
| 4th | 1925 by-election | James O'Mara (CnaG) | Thomas Hennessy (CnaG) | Constance Markievicz (Rep) | Myles Keogh (Ind.) | Cathal Ó Murchadha (Rep) | Seán Lemass (SF) | Peadar Doyle (CnaG) |
| 5th | 1927 (Jun) | James Beckett (CnaG) | Vincent Rice (NL) | Constance Markievicz (FF) | Myles Keogh (Ind.) | Thomas Lawlor (Lab) | Seán Lemass (FF) | Peadar Doyle (CnaG) |
| 5th | 1927 by-election | James Beckett (CnaG) | Vincent Rice (NL) | Thomas Hennessy (CnaG) | Myles Keogh (Ind.) | Thomas Lawlor (Lab) | Seán Lemass (FF) | Peadar Doyle (CnaG) |
| 6th | 1927 (Sep) | James Beckett (CnaG) | Robert Briscoe (FF) | Thomas Hennessy (CnaG) | Myles Keogh (CnaG) | Frank Kerlin (FF) | Seán Lemass (FF) | Peadar Doyle (CnaG) |
| 7th | 1932 | James Beckett (CnaG) | Robert Briscoe (FF) | Thomas Hennessy (CnaG) | Myles Keogh (CnaG) | James Lynch (FF) | Seán Lemass (FF) | Peadar Doyle (CnaG) |
| 8th | 1933 | James Beckett (CnaG) | Robert Briscoe (FF) | James McGuire (CnaG) | Thomas Kelly (FF) | James Lynch (FF) | Seán Lemass (FF) | Peadar Doyle (CnaG) |
| 9th | 1937 | Myles Keogh (FG) | Robert Briscoe (FF) | Thomas Lawlor (Lab) | Thomas Kelly (FF) | Joseph Hannigan (Ind.) | Seán Lemass (FF) | Peadar Doyle (FG) |
| 10th | 1938 | James Beckett (FG) | Robert Briscoe (FF) | James Lynch (FF) | Thomas Kelly (FF) | Joseph Hannigan (Ind.) | Seán Lemass (FF) | Peadar Doyle (FG) |
| 10th | 1939 by-election | John McCann (FF) | Robert Briscoe (FF) | James Lynch (FF) | Thomas Kelly (FF) | Joseph Hannigan (Ind.) | Seán Lemass (FF) | Peadar Doyle (FG) |
| 11th | 1943 | Maurice Dockrell (FG) | Robert Briscoe (FF) | James Lynch (FF) | James Larkin Jnr (Lab) | John McCann (FF) | Seán Lemass (FF) | Peadar Doyle (FG) |
| 12th | 1944 | Maurice Dockrell (FG) | Robert Briscoe (FF) | James Lynch (FF) | James Larkin Jnr (Lab) | John McCann (FF) | Seán Lemass (FF) | Peadar Doyle (FG) |
| 13th | 1948 | Constituency abolished. See Dublin South-Central, Dublin South-East and Dublin South-West. | | | | | | |

| Dáil | Election | Deputy (Party) | Deputy (Party) | Deputy (Party) | Deputy (Party) | Deputy (Party) |
|---|---|---|---|---|---|---|
| 22nd | 1981 | Niall Andrews (FF) | Séamus Brennan (FF) | Nuala Fennell (FG) | John Kelly (FG) | Alan Shatter (FG) |
| 23rd | 1982 (Feb) | Niall Andrews (FF) | Séamus Brennan (FF) | Nuala Fennell (FG) | John Kelly (FG) | Alan Shatter (FG) |
| 24th | 1982 (Nov) | Niall Andrews (FF) | Séamus Brennan (FF) | Nuala Fennell (FG) | John Kelly (FG) | Alan Shatter (FG) |
| 25th | 1987 | Tom Kitt (FF) | Séamus Brennan (FF) | Anne Colley (PDs) | John Kelly (FG) | Alan Shatter (FG) |
| 26th | 1989 | Tom Kitt (FF) | Séamus Brennan (FF) | Nuala Fennell (FG) | Roger Garland (GP) | Alan Shatter (FG) |
| 27th | 1992 | Tom Kitt (FF) | Séamus Brennan (FF) | Liz O'Donnell (PDs) | Eithne FitzGerald (Lab) | Alan Shatter (FG) |
| 28th | 1997 | Tom Kitt (FF) | Séamus Brennan (FF) | Liz O'Donnell (PDs) | Olivia Mitchell (FG) | Alan Shatter (FG) |
| 29th | 2002 | Tom Kitt (FF) | Séamus Brennan (FF) | Liz O'Donnell (PDs) | Olivia Mitchell (FG) | Eamon Ryan (GP) |
| 30th | 2007 | Tom Kitt (FF) | Séamus Brennan (FF) | Alan Shatter (FG) | Olivia Mitchell (FG) | Eamon Ryan (GP) |
| 30th | 2009 by-election | Tom Kitt (FF) | George Lee (FG) | Alan Shatter (FG) | Olivia Mitchell (FG) | Eamon Ryan (GP) |
| 31st | 2011 | Shane Ross (Ind.) | Peter Mathews (FG) | Alan Shatter (FG) | Olivia Mitchell (FG) | Alex White (Lab) |
| 32nd | 2016 | Constituency abolished. See Dublin Rathdown, Dublin South-West and Dún Laoghaire. | | | | |
