= Keep Ireland Open =

Irish countryside access campaign group

- Formation: 1994
- Type: NGO, pressure group
- Headquarters: Dublin, Ireland
- Chairman: Roger Garland
- Website: keepirelandopen.org

Keep Ireland Open is a voluntary campaign organisation established to promote access to the Irish countryside and walkways. Founded in 1994, its chairman is former Green Party TD, Roger Garland. The group believes Irish legislation protecting rights-of-way and access to recreational use of land is inadequate and minimal. It consists of combination of individual members and various outdoors and environmental groups; including the Irish Ramblers, An Óige, all of the Scout and Guide Associations, the United Farmers Association, Irish Wildlife Trust, Association of Irish Riding Clubs, Federation of Local History Society and a number of walking groups. It claims that Ireland has one of the poorest records of protecting walking routes in Europe and that it is heavily influenced by farmers' lobby groups that resist further legislation. The organisation states freedom to roam over rough grazing land, a network of well-maintained rights-of-way in lowland areas and minimisation of barbed-wire fencing in mountain areas and beaches, as its aspirations. Keep Ireland Open has also been involved in several individual access disputes around the country, including in counties Wicklow, Cork, Sligo, Donegal, Mayo. These include groups such as the Uggool Beach and Free the Old Head of Kinsale campaigns which campaign for restoration of public access where it was previously enjoyed.

Keep Ireland Open representatives make presentations to government bodies, county councils, and submissions to Oireachtas Committees in support of the right to roam.

== See also ==
- Freedom to roam
- Right of way
