= Akademi Kreyòl Ayisyen =

Language regulator of Haitian Creole

Haitian Creole Academy
- Akademi Kreyòl Ayisyen
- Formation: 4 December 2014
- Headquarters: 20, Avni Lamartinièr, (Bwa vèna) Port-au-Prince, Haiti
- Services: Language regulation
- Members: 33–55 members
- President: Rosilia François Corneille
- Website: akademikreyol.net

The Second Official Orthographic Resolution

The Akademi Kreyòl Ayisyen (AKA; pronounced [akademi kɣejɔl ajisjɛ̃]; French: Académie du Créole Haïtien; lit. 'Haitian Creole Academy') is the language regulator of Haitian Creole. It is composed of up to 55 scholars under the leadership of Rogéda Dorcé Dorcil.

== Background ==
The Haitian Creole language did not have any regulation until the 1940s, when former Haitian president Élie Lescot made attempts at standardizing the language. It had an official orthography by the late 1970s, and it was elevated to co-official language with French in the 1987 Haitian Constitution. The constitution, in Article 213, stated that a Haitian creole language academy should be founded. The language still lacked an academy to regulate its evolution until about 25 years later.

== History ==
In December 2014, the Haitian president and legislation approved of the establishment of the Haitian Creole Academy. 33 scholars came together and formed the organization to form a uniform syntax, to ensure the Haitian government is able to better communicate with its people, lead the way for more publications of books and various other forms of media, and to end the stigma behind speaking the language.

In 2017, Renauld Govain, dean of the Faculty of Applied Linguistics at the State University of Haiti, criticized the Akademi's first resolution, saying it confused orthography, alphabet, and spelling.

== Members ==
The Akademi Kreyòl Ayisyen allows for anywhere from 33 to 55 akademisyen – or members. As of 2018, they included the following:

- Nicolas André (founding member)
- Paul Antoine
- Dominique Barthélemy
- Emmanuel Bazile (founding member)
- Serge Bellegarde (founding member)
- Jean Grégory Calixte (founding member)
- Adeline Magloire Chancy (founding member)
- Christophe Charles (founding member)
- Pierre Michel Chéry (founding member)
- Rosilia François Corneille
- Michel DeGraff (founding member)
- Fritz Deshommes (founding member)
- Rogeda Dorcé Dorcil (founding member)
- Wilner Dorlus (founding member)
- Rachelle Charlier Doucet
- Marie Rodny Laurent Estéus (founding member)
- Odette Roy Fombrun (founding member)
- Michel Frantz Grandoit (founding member)
- Michel-Ange Hyppolite (founding member)
- Gesner Jean-Paul (founding member)
- Pauris Jean-Baptiste (president; founding member)
- Samuel Jean-Baptiste (founding member)
- Marky Jean-Pierre (founding member)
- Joseph Sauveur Joseph (founding member)
- Rochambeau Lainy (founding member)
- Frenand Léger (founding member)
- Jacques Max Manigat (founding member)
- Guy Gérald Ménard (founding member)
- Ernst Mirville
- Claude Pierre (founding member)
- Pierre-André Pierre (founding member)
- Emmanuel Christian Plancher (founding member)
- Clotaire Saint-Natus (founding member)
- Gérard-Marie Tardieu (founding member)
- Jocelyne Trouillot (founding member)
- Féquière Vilsaint (founding member)

=== Former members ===
- Max Gesner Beauvoir (founding member; died 2015)
- Rachel Beauvoir Dominique (died 2018)
- Marie Marcelle Buteau Racine (died 2020)
