= Marie Marcelle Buteau Racine =

Haitian-American linguist and professor (1934–2020)

- Born: May 31, 1934; Les Cayes, Haiti
- Died: July 23, 2020 (aged 86); Philadelphia, PA
- Education: Howard University, Georgetown University
- Occupations: linguist, author, professor

Marie Marcelle Buteau Racine was a professor of linguistics.

== Biography ==
Marie Marcelle Buteau Racine was born on May 31, 1934, in Les Cayes, Haiti. She was a Haitian professor of linguistics and a founding member of the Akademi Kreyòl Ayisyen/Haitian Creole Academy. She emigrated to the United States in 1963 with her husband and later earned a M.A. in French from Howard University and a PhD in French and Theoretical Linguistics from Georgetown University. She would later teach at the University of the District of Columbia while being involved in social issues related to education, women's rights, and justice in Haiti, Latin America, and the United States. She died July 23, 2020, at the age of 86.

== Career ==
Racine was hired by Federal City College (later University of the District of Columbia) in 1969. She served as chair of the Department of Foreign Languages and later served as Associate Dean of the College of Liberal and Fine Arts from 1978 to 1987 and was acting dean from 1987 to 1988. She served as university assessment coordinator from 2003 to 2009, retiring in 2013. She was a Fulbright-Hays Fellow in 2002. Racine was a founding member of the Haitian Creole Academy (AKA) in 2014, an organization formed to preserve and foster the study of Haitian Creole. In addition to her work fostering the study of Haitian Creole, Racine also published on critical education issues in the American context.

== Personal life ==
Buteau married Étzer Racine and had two children, daughter Mikaele, and son Karl Anthony Racine, a prominent lawyer and politician and current attorney general of the District of Columbia.

== Selected works ==
- Racine, M. M. B. (1970). French and Creole lexico-semantic conflicts: A contribution to the study of languages in contact in the Haitian diglossic situation.
- Racine, M. M. B. (1976). A linguistic study of southern Haitian Creole: Phonology. Howard University.
- Racine, M. M. B. (1981). Adaptation of Haitian students to American schools.
- Racine, M. M. B. (1982). Influences on curriculum development in the public schools of Washington, D.C., 1804–1982. Dept. of Urban Studies, University of the District of Columbia.
- Racine, M. M. B., & Morisseau-Leroy, F. (1975). French Creole In The Caribbean. CLA Journal, 18(4), 491–500.
- Racine, M. M. B., Ogle, K., & Ecumenical Program on Central America and the Caribbean. (1999). Like the dew that waters the grass: Words from Haitian women.
- Racine, M. M. B., & Rode, M. E. (1989). Critical junctures: The process of change in public higher education in Washington, D.C., 1977–1987. Center for Applied Research and Urban Policy, University of the District of Columbia.
- Tatàn, & Racine, M. M. B. (1998). From “Like the Dew That Waters the Grass: Words from Haitian Women.” Women's Studies Quarterly, 26(3/4), 40–47.
