= Rachel Beauvoir-Dominique =

Haitian anthropologist (1965–2018)

Rachel Beauvoir-Dominique (18 May 1965 – 5 January 2018) was a Haitian anthropologist and Vodou mambo.

== Early life ==
Beauvoir-Dominique's father was Max Beauvoir, a Haitian biochemist, and her mother was Elisabeth Marchand, a French national and a mambo. She was born in 1965 while he was working as a researcher at the Cornell Medical Center in New York City. She was raised along with her sister Estelle Beauvoir Manuel in the United States and Haiti. In 1973 Max Beauvoir abandoned his career in chemistry, returned to Haiti, became a houngan and founded a Hounfour.

== Academic and religious career ==
Beauvoir-Dominique attended Tufts University where she studied cultural anthropology, and then the University of Oxford, where she studied social anthropology. She had been a critic of the Duvalier dictatorship and returned to Haiti to help rebuild following the regime's 1986 collapse. Beauvoir-Dominique joined the faculty of the University of Haiti, where she taught anthropology and Haitian culture.

In 1987, Beauvoir-Dominique and her husband, architect Didier Dominique, published Savalou E, a book about Vodou but also about Haiti's peasant society. Rather than an academic text, they intended the book to be accessible to the many Vodou practitioners who participated in their research. The book is written in Haitian Creole and they adapted it for radio to be broadcast in Haiti. The book was awarded the 1989 Casa de las Américas Prize. The book was republished 2003.

In the 1990s she collected oral histories in communities near Bois Caïman, the site of the 1791 meeting and Vodou ceremony where the first major slave insurrection of the Haitian Revolution is believed to have been planned. Her scholarship has helped bolster the claim that the meeting was, in fact, an historical event and not apocryphal. In 2000, she published a book on the subject, titled Investigations autour du sites historique du Bois Caïman.

Beauvoir-Dominique and her husband were untiring advocates and defenders of Vodou. They curated international museum exhibits dedicated to the religion in Chicago and Ottawa. In 2012 she was part of a group that successfully petitioned the Library of Congress to replace the outdated "Voodoo" with their preferred term, "Vodou", explaining that the former reflects a history of racism and is pejorative. Like her father, they both practiced Vodou; she was considered a mambo (or priestess) and, after the deaths of his wife (2018) and his father-in-law (2015), Dominique is considered the "heir" to Max Beauvoir, who had been the most important figure in Haitian Vodou at the time of his death.

== Death ==
Beauvoir-Dominique died of cancer on 5 January 2018. Her funeral in Mariani was attended by members of the government, Haitian Vodou officials, members of the Akademi Kreyòl Ayisyen, representative of Religions for Peace, journalist Liliane Pierre-Paul, former cabinet minister Marie Michèle Rey, former prime minister Michèle Pierre-Louis, and other Haitian and international luminaries.

== Works ==
=== Selected papers ===
- Beauvoir-Dominique, Rachel (2004). "Rara!: Vodou, Power, and Performance in Haiti and its Diaspora". Transforming Anthropology. 12 (1–2): 88–90. doi:10.1525/tran.2004.12.1-2.88.
- Beauvoir-Dominique, Rachel (2005). "Freeing the double. Beauty will be convulsive: On a collection of vodoo Art". Gradhiva. 1 (1): 5.
- Hainard, Jacques; Mathez, Philippe, eds. (2007). "Des traditions plastiques vodou-makaya dans le patrimoine haïtien". Le Vodou Un Art de Vivre (in French) (7). Musée Ethnographique de Genève: 171. doi:10.4000/gradhiva.1156.
- Beauvoir Dominique, Rachel (2010). "The Social Value of Voodoo throughout History: Slavery, Migrations and Solidarity". Museum International. 62 (4): 99–105. doi:10.1111/j.1468-0033.2011.01741.x. S2CID 142654011.

=== Chapters ===
- Beauvoir-Dominique, Rachel (2009). "The Rock Images of Haiti: A Living Heritage". In Hayward, Michele; Atkinson, Lesley-Gail; Cinquino, Michael A. (eds.). Rock Art of the Caribbean. University of Alabama Press. pp. 78–89. ISBN 9780817355302.
- Beauvoir-Dominique, Rachel (2017). "Les Bizango d'Haiti". In Vega, C.A.; Gilbert, R.; Canovas, G.V. (eds.). Haïti, Histoires et Rêves, Societé, Art et Culture (in French). El Colegio de Mexico.

=== Books ===
- Beauvoir-Dominique, Rachel; Dominique, Didier (2003) [First published 1987]. Savalou E (in Haitian Creole). Éditions du CIDIHCA.
- Beauvoir-Dominique, Rachel (1991). L'Ancienne Cathédrale de Port-au-Prince: perspectives d'un vestige de carrefours (in French). Henri Deschamps.
- Beauvoir-Dominique, Rachel (2000). Bois Caiman: investigation autour du site historique (in French). Ministry of Culture, Government of Haiti.

=== Radio ===
- Beauvoir, Rachel; Dominque, Didier (12 February 1989). Entre Nous: "Savalou E" (Radio broadcast) (in Haitian Creole). Radio Haiti.
