= KOSANBA =

Scholarly association studying Haitian Vodou

KOSANBA is a scholarly association dedicated to the study of Haitian Vodou.

== Founding ==
The organization was founded in 1997 at the Center for Black Studies Research of the University of California, Santa Barbara, then under the directorship of Claudine Michel. Dr. Michel serves as executive director of KOSANBA.

Thirteen scholars met for a colloquium on Haitian Vodou titled The Spirit and The Reality: Vodou and Haiti on April 25–26, 1997. At the end of the conference, they decided to institutionalize their efforts through a new association under the name The Congress of Santa Barbara. Using the Haitian Creole name for congress (kóngre) with the San- and Ba- of Santa Barbara, the abbreviation KOSANBA was born.

== Ongoing activities ==
According to their declaration, KOSANBA "proposes to have an impact on Haitian cultural politics as well as on other measures and policies that affect the Republic of Haiti ... It is the belief of the Congress that Vodou plays and shall continue to play a major role in the grand scheme of Haitian development and in the socio-economic, political, and cultural arenas. Development, when real and successful, always comes from the modernization of ancestral traditions, anchored in the rich cultural expressions of a nation."

KOSANBA meets every two years. Its colloquium on July 13–17, 2009, was held in Mirebalais, Haiti to coincide with the Saut-d'Eau pilgrimage. After the 2010 earthquake, KOSANBA did not meet until 2013. Its tenth colloquium was held October 18–20 of that year at Harvard University. The eleventh colloquium took place in Montréal from October 21–25, 2015, and the twelfth in New Orleans from November 1–3, 2017. In 2019, the association held its thirteenth colloquium at the Forum for Scholars and Publics at Duke University in Durham, North Carolina.

The current president of the association is Yanique Hume, Lecturer in Cultural Studies, University of the West Indies, Cave Hill Campus. LeGrace Benson, Director, Arts of Haiti Research Project, is Immediate Past President.
