= National Confederation of Haitian Vodou =

Haitian civil religious organization

The National Confederation of Haitian Vodou (Konfederasyon Nasyonal Vodou Ayisyen) is a Haitian civil organization which seeks to defend the practice of Haitian Vodou from defamation and persecution. It was headed by Max Beauvoir, until his death in 2015, who served as chef Supreme or "Ati Nasyonal" of the organization.

== History ==
In 2005, Beauvoir, a houngan and biochemist, launched the Federasyon Nasyonal Vodou Ayisyen, which he later renamed in 2008 as Konfederasyon Nasyonal Vodou Ayisyen.

In the aftermath of the 2010 Haiti earthquake, he expressed the KNVA's disapproval of the mass graves which were hastily dug for tens of thousands of deceased Haitian victims to René Préval, and he became one of the more prominent advocates of Haitian Vodouisants affected by the earthquake and the aftermath of anti-vodou violence motivated by Christian evangelicals.

The KNVA appointed a member, Anténor Guerrier, to the nine-member Provisional Electoral Council for the 2010 general election.

== Leadership ==
Beauvoir headed the organization as Ati from 2005 until his death in 2015. Following his death, a houngan from Gros Morne, Alcenat Zamor, was elected Ati on 12 December 2015, but died from pre-existing complications from a car accident on 30 December before he could be inducted. Following a transition period, Jérémie houngan Joseph Fritzner Comas was elected Ati on 27 February 2016, and was inducted on 16 May 2016. Comas was dismissed from his position on February 1, 2019 by the supervising council of the federation. After Ismaite André served as the interim Ati for several months and an election was held on May 13, 2019, Carl-Henry Desmornes was inaugurated on August 14, 2019 as the third Ati.
