= McConnell–Laubach orthography =

The McConnell–Laubach orthography is the revised form of a previously proposed orthographic system for Haitian Creole. It was first developed by H. Ormonde McConnell and his wife Primrose in 1940, and then later revised by him and Frank Laubach in 1943.

== History ==
=== McConnell ===
In 1940, a Protestant missionaries H. Ormonde and Primrose McConnell developed and proposed the first widely recognized phonemic system of writing for the Haitian Creole language. Prior to McConnell's attempt at creating a system of orthography, however, the Haitian diplomat Georges Sylvain had developed a small number of materials for the French-Haitian Creole bilingual elites, from his own French-based system of writing. Because it was largely unavailable to the masses, McConnell determined to create a system everyone could use. This original writing system contained 33 symbols:

Oral Vowels: a, è, é, i, o, ò, u

Nasal Vowels: â, ê, ô

Semi-Vowels: i/y, w, u

Consonants: b, d, f, g, h, j, k, l, m, n, p, r, s, t, v, z

Digraphs: sh, gn

=== McConnell-Laubach ===
American missionary Frank Laubach was not a speaker of Creole, though he was an expert in literacy. In 1943, he helped McConnell to revise his orthographic system, which resulted in what's known as the McConnell–Laubach Orthography. This contained two major changes: /ou/ instead of /u/, as in dou (Eng. 'gentle'), and /ch/ instead of /sh/, as in chante (Eng. 'to sing').

== Criticisms of the McConnell-Laubach system ==
=== Charles Pressoir ===
The greatest opponent to this new orthography was a Haitian scholar named Charles Pressoir. He, along with a number of Haitian intellectuals, claimed that the use of "Anglo-Saxon" letters in Haitian orthography looked "too American" and reminded the people of Haiti of the recent American occupation. More linguistically, he also heavily criticized the lack of front-rounded vowels, and was concerned that the method of transcribing nasal vowels could make it difficult for Haitians to learn French; something that he attributed to McConnell and Laubach's unfamiliarity with the French language and orthography.

In 1946, Pressoir and L. Faublas, the Haitian minister of education, responded with their own revised version of the McConnell–Laubach orthography, making several substantial changes in favor of "Frenchifying" the writing system. This was the Faublas-Pressoir system, and later called "alphabet ONAAC" when it was adopted by the Haitian government.

=== Political and cultural tensions ===
The backlash against the proposed McConnell-Laubach system was, at its heart, a fight for the cultural identity of Haiti. While the McConnell–Laubach orthography was an uncomfortable reminder of the American/Protestant occupation, Pressoir's alternative was a return to French control. Some years after the Faublas-Pressoir system was developed, however, a group of French Linguists from the University of Paris developed yet another orthography, adopted by the Institut Pédagogique National (IPN), that was more consistent than its predecessors and seen as a better representation of the language. In 1979, the IPN orthography was declared the official orthography of Haitian Creole.

== Comparison of Haitian orthographic systems ==
| IPA | McConnell-Laubach | Fablaus-Pressoir | IPN |
|---|---|---|---|
| Nasal vowels | | | |
| ẽ | ê | in | en |
| ã | â | an | an |
| õ | ô | on | on |
| ẽn | ên | inn | enn |
| ãn | ân | ann | ann |
| õn | ôn | onn | onn |
| ũn | ûn | oun | oun |
| ĩn | în | i-n | in |
| Oral vowel & /n/ | | | |
| in | in | i-n | in |
| ɔn | òn | òn | òn |
| an | an | a-n | àn |
| un | un | oun | oun |
| Mid vowels | | | |
| ɛ | è | è | è |
| e | é | é | e |
| o | o | o | o |
| ɔ | ò | ò | ò |
| Semi-vowels | | | |
| j | y, i | y, i (pre-vocalic) | y |
| w | w | w, ou (pre-vocalic) | w |
| Initial/post-consonantal /r/ | | | |
| w | r | r | w |
Source: Valdman et al. 1982
