= 1939 Dublin South by-election =

By-election to the 10th Dáil

- 6 June 1939
- Turnout: 35,936 (44.4%)
	McCann	Cahill
Nominee	John McCann	Patrick Cahill
Party	Fianna Fáil	Fine Gael
First preferences	20,059	15,877
Percentage	55.8%	44.2%
TD before election
James Beckett
Fine Gael
TD after election
John McCann
Fianna Fáil

A Dáil by-election was held in the constituency of Dublin South in Ireland on Tuesday, 6 June 1939, to fill a vacancy in the 10th Dáil. It followed the death of Fine Gael TD James Beckett on 19 December 1938.

In 1939, Dublin South was a seven-seat constituency which included the wards of Fitzwilliam, Merchants Quay, Mansion House, New Kilmainham, Royal Exchange, South City, South Dock, Trinity, Ushers Quay and Wood Quay; and also included Ringsend.

The writ of election to fill the vacancy was agreed by the Dáil on 17 May 1939.

It was the first by-election held in Ireland after the Constitution of Ireland came into force on 29 December 1937.

The by-election was won by the Fianna Fáil candidate John McCann.

== Result ==
1939 Dublin South by-election
Party	Candidate	FPv%	Count
Party	Candidate	FPv%	1
Fianna Fáil	John McCann	55.8	20,059
Fine Gael	Patrick Cahill	44.2	15,877
Electorate: 80,961 Valid: 35,936 Quota: 17,969 Turnout: 44.4%
