= Walter Beckett (composer) =

Irish composer

- Born: July 27, 1914; Dublin, Ireland
- Died: April 3, 1996 (aged 81) Dublin, Ireland
- Occupations: Composer, teacher, music critic
- Years active: 1945–1989

Walter Keohler Beckett (27 July 1914 – 3 April 1996) was an Irish composer, teacher and music critic. He was a cousin of the writer Samuel Beckett.

== Life ==
Beckett was born in Dublin. His parents were Elizabeth Ethel Beckett (née Keller) and James Beckett, a politician and builder. He studied organ with George Hewson and harmony with John F. Larchet at the Royal Irish Academy of Music (RIAM), in addition to music at Trinity College Dublin where he was conferred with a Mus.D. (Doctor of Music) in 1942. He lived from 1946 to 1963 in Venice, where he taught English and piano; he also wrote reviews from abroad for the Irish Times and made a series of orchestral arrangements of Irish traditional music for Radio Éireann.

In 1963 he moved to England, where he taught music at various schools before returning to Ireland in 1970 to succeed A.J. Potter at the RIAM as a professor of harmony and counterpoint; however, after having suffered a stroke in 1985, he had to retire. In 1986 he was elected a member of Aosdána, and an Honorary Fellow of the RIAM in 1990. He died in Dublin in 1996.

== Music ==
Beckett's more ambitious works from the 1940s and 1950s are a Suite for Orchestra (1945), Four Higgins Songs (1946), The Falaingin Dances (1958) and a Suite of Planxties (1960) for harp and orchestra. In the 1980s he produced a number of remarkable works such as the Quartet for Strings (1980) and Dublin Symphony (1989) for narrator, chamber choir and large orchestra. While Beckett was never a modernist, his later works nevertheless contained some advanced harmony, particularly in the quartet.

== Writings on music ==
Besides his activity as a music critic for the Irish Times, Beckett also wrote biographical articles for dictionaries, in particular for the first edition of Die Musik in Geschichte und Gegenwart.

His books include studies on Franz Liszt and ballet music:

- Liszt ("The Master Musicians" series) (London, 1956; revised edition, 1963)
- First Harmony Course (Dublin, 1976)
- contributions to Humphrey Searle: Ballet Music: An Introduction (London, 1958; revised edition, 1973)

== Compositions ==
Orchestral

- Suite for Orchestra (1945)
- Irish Suite (1952)
- The Enchanted Valley (1956)
- Irish Rhapsody (1957)
- The Falaingin Dances (1958)
- Suite of Planxties (1960) for harp and orchestra

Other instrumental music

- Preludes (1942; rev. 1980) for piano
- Prelude (1960) for piano
- Quartet for Strings (1980)
- Occasional Voluntary (1985) for organ

Vocal and choral

- Four Higgins Songs (Frederick Robert Higgins) (1946), for tenor and small orchestra
- Ancient Irish Lullaby (Suantraí) (trad. words, English translations by Gerald Griffin) (London, 1954), for female voices and piano
- An teicheadh go hÉigipt (anonymous) (1974), for soprano, mixed chorus and orchestra
- A dhroimín donn dílis (anonymous) (1974), for baritone and orchestra
- Goldenhair (James Joyce) (1980), song-cycle for low voice and piano
- Dublin Symphony (Rhoda Coghill, James Joyce) (1989), for narrator, mixed chorus and orchestra
