= George F. Beckett =

Irish architect (1877 – 1961)

- Born: George Francis Beckett; 15 April 1877; 7 Grosvenor Place, Rathmines, Dublin, Ireland
- Died: 21 November 1961 (aged 84); Dublin, Ireland
- Resting place: Deans Grange Cemetery

George F. Beckett (15 April 1877 – 21 November 1961) was an Irish architect.

== Early life and family ==
George Francis Beckett was born in 7 Grosvenor Place, Rathmines, Dublin on 15 April or 5 July 1877. His parents were Frances (née Horner) and James Beckett, builder. This was his father's second marriage, and he was the founder and president of the Dublin Master Builders' Association. Beckett was his parents' second son. He had four brothers and four sisters, as well as 4 half siblings from his father's first marriage to Mary Ann Jessie Kennedy. His brother, James Walter became a TD and building contractor. The family moved to 7 Kildare Street while Beckett's father worked on the construction of National Library and National Museum of Ireland. They later moved to Ely Place. He was a relative of Samuel Beckett. He attended Rathmines school, Dublin, after which he was a pupil and junior assistant to James Franklin Fuller. He then joined the office of Thomas Worthington & Son in Manchester.

On 9 June 1902 he married Edith Alice Park. They had two daughters and one son. His daughter, Primrose, married the Rev. H. Ormonde McConnell and became a missionary in Haiti. The family lived at 73 Lansdowne Road, Dublin. Beckett died on 21 November 1961, and is buried in Deans Grange Cemetery, County Dublin.

== Career ==
Beckett returned to Dublin in 1897, establishing his practice at 97 St Stephen's Green. His first major commission was for the Dublin Bread Company, for a tea-rooms and restaurant at 6–7 Lower Sackville Street, Dublin. Constructed using a steel frame faced with brick and Portland stone dressing around 1900, it was destroyed during the 1916 Easter Rising. He designed a number of Methodist churches across Ireland, such as in Dolphin's Barn, Dublin, Roscrea, County Tipperary, and Killarney, County Kerry. He also designed a number of Munster & Leinster Bank branches, including in Limerick and Cork, as well as flour mills and factories. In 1919, the architectural practice was renamed Beckett & Harrington when he took Cyril Ashlin Harrington into partnership.

Beckett was an active member of the Architectural Association of Ireland from 1900, serving in various offices almost continuously between 1901 and 1920, including as president in 1909 and 1919. In 1906, he was the first recipient of the Downes bronze medal for measured drawings. From 1905 he was also a member of the Royal Institute of the Architects of Ireland, serving as president from 1932 to 1934, and sitting on the town planning committee from 1927 to 1930 and 1937 to 1942. He was a member and an officer in the Civics Institute of Ireland from 1921, and had a particular interest in the clearance of slums and the building of children's playgrounds. He was appointed chair of the organising committee of the Dublin civic survey in 1923, and in this capacity co-authored the new town plan. He retired from architectural practice in 1950.
