= Jacques Max Manigat =

Haitian scholar (born 1931)

Jacques Max Manigat (born 29 December 1931) is a Haitian scholar. Originally from Cap-Haïtien, he is a member of the Akademi Kreyòl Ayisyen (Haitian Creole Academy). He is the author of several books on the Haitian diaspora.
