= Patrick Cahill (Fine Gael politician) =

Irish politician

Lord Mayor of Dublin
- In office 1947–1948
- Preceded by: John McCann
- Succeeded by: John Breen

Personal details
- Party: Fine Gael

Patrick Joseph Cahill was an Irish Fine Gael politician. He was a member of Dublin Corporation, and served as Lord Mayor of Dublin from 1947 to 1948.

He was an unsuccessful Fine Gael candidate for the Dublin South constituency at the 1939 by-election, and at the 1943 general election. He was also an unsuccessful candidate for the Dublin South-Central constituency at the 1948 general election.

Civic offices
Preceded by John McCann	Lord Mayor of Dublin; 1947–1948	Succeeded by John Breen
