= Michel DeGraff =

Haitian creolist (born 1963)

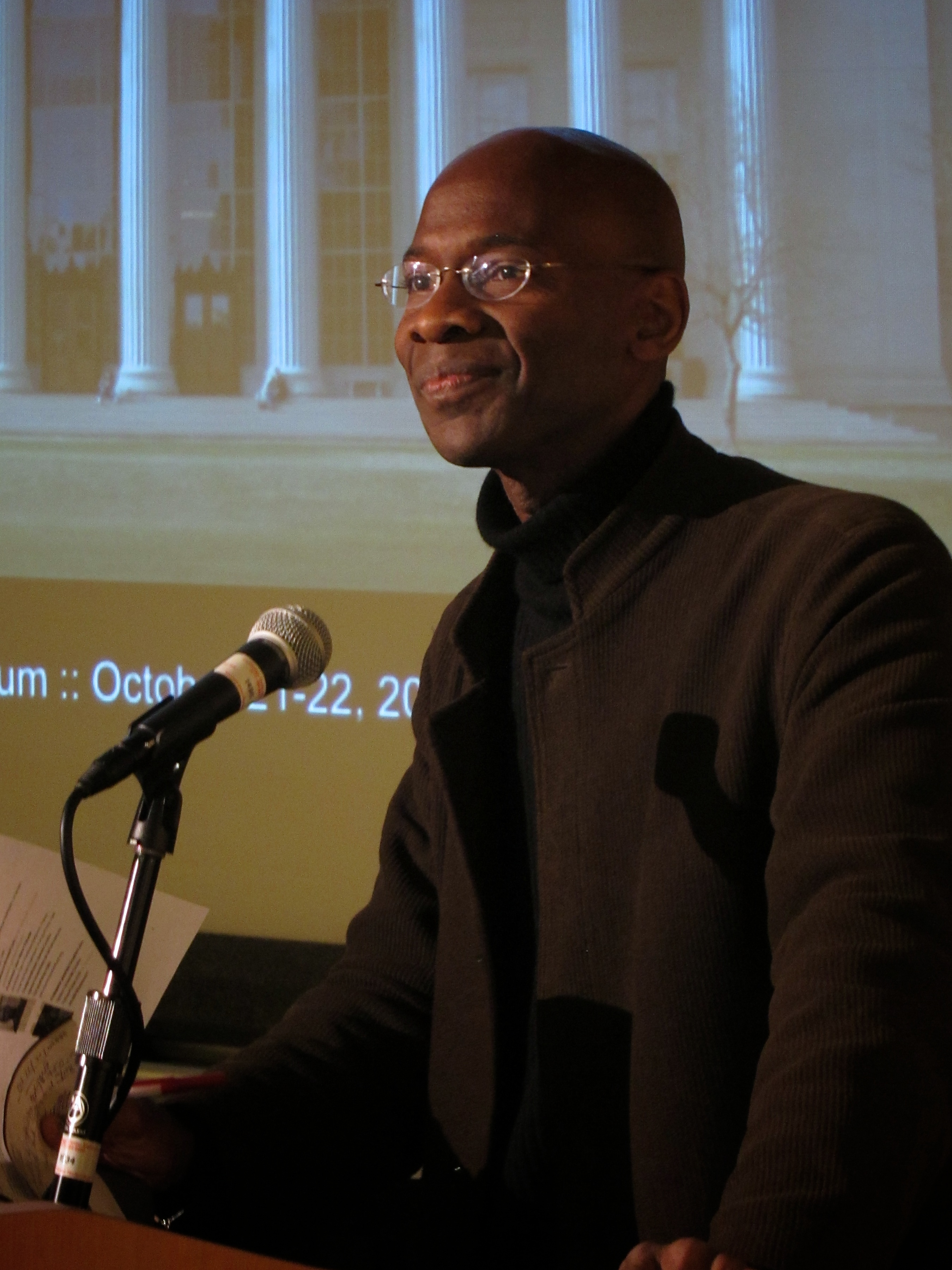
- Michel DeGraff at MIT-Haiti Symposium in 2010
- Born: 1963 (age 62–63); Haiti
- Education: City College of New York (BS); University of Pennsylvania (PhD)
- Scientific career
- Fields: Linguistics
- Workplaces: Massachusetts Institute of Technology
- Thesis: Creole grammars and acquisition of syntax: The case of Haitian
- Website: Official site

Michel Anne Frederic DeGraff (born 1963) is a Haitian creolist and a professor at the Massachusetts Institute of Technology (MIT). His scholarship focuses on Creole studies and the role of language and linguistics for decolonization and liberation. He has advocated for the recognition of Haitian Creole as a full-fledged language.

== Early life and education ==
DeGraff was born in Haiti in 1963. He grew up in a middle-class family and attended a school where the instruction was in French. He felt that French was a hindrance at school, as not speaking it well caused complexes of inferiority among otherwise bright children. He believes that he spoke one and a half languages, with Haitian Creole being the "half", when in fact the language that all children spoke well by default was Creole. He recalls that French, although imposed at home and at school, was never used for jokes or on the soccer field.

DeGraff moved to New York in 1982 and enrolled in City College of New York, where he studied computer science. He developed an interest in linguistics during an internship at Bell Labs in New Jersey in 1985, as a Summer Intern at AT&T Bell Laboratories' Linguistics and Artificial Intelligence department. In 1992, he earned a PhD in computer science from the University of Pennsylvania, with a dissertation on the role of language acquisition in the formation of the syntax of Haitian Creole.

== Academic career ==
DeGraff is a professor at the Massachusetts Institute of Technology. He previously served on the board of the Journal of Haitian Studies. He is also a founding member of the Haitian Creole Academy.

In the fall of 2012, he received a $1 million grant from the National Science Foundation to introduce online Creole language materials in the teaching of STEM in Haiti. He believes that Haitian children should be taught in their native language at all levels of instruction, contrary to the tradition of teaching them in French. DeGraff believes that instruction in French, a foreign language for most Haitian children, hinders their creativity and their ability to excel.

In 2022, DeGraff was elected as a fellow of the Linguistic Society of America.

In 2023, DeGraff came into conflict with the MIT administration as a result of his publicly espoused political views. After participating in pro-Palestinian protests with students, he proposed a course on the use of language and linguistics in decolonization, liberation, and peace and community building. The course was rejected because he was deemed not qualified to teach it. After complaints and protests about that decision, DeGraff filed a federal lawsuit against MIT over free speech and academic freedom. Administrators sanctioned him for being disruptive and removed him from the school's linguistics department.

== See also ==
- Akademi Kreyòl Ayisyen
