= James Franklin Fuller =

James Franklin Fuller (1835–1924) was an Irish actor, architect and novelist.

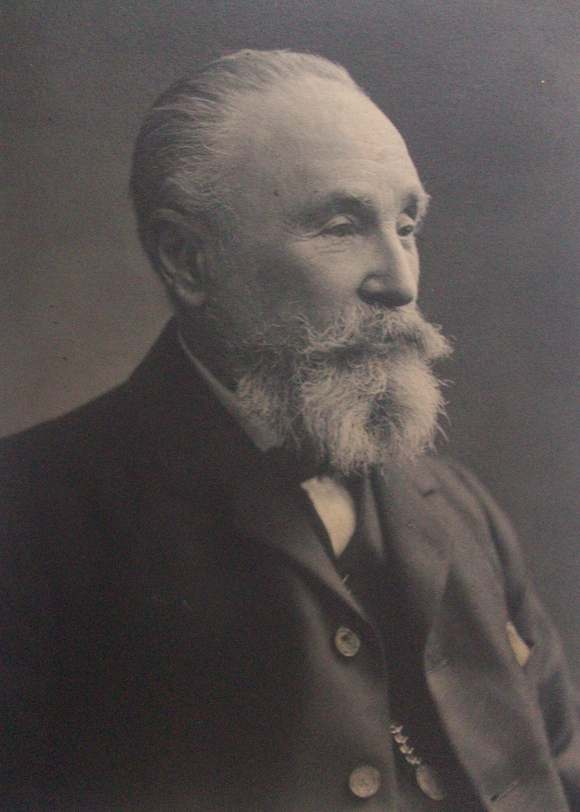
James Franklin Fuller

== Life ==
Fuller was born at Nedanone, County Kerry, the only son of Thomas Harnett Fuller of Glashnacree, County Kerry, by his first wife, Frances Diana, a daughter of Francis Christopher Bland of Derryquin Castle. He was educated in Blackrock, County Cork, and Dublin.

In 1850 he went to London where he qualified as an architect, and later moved to Manchester.

In 1862 he became a district architect under the Board of Ecclesiastical Commissioners in Ireland. In 1869, after the Church of Ireland was disestablished, he set up his own practice in Dublin. Two years later he became architect to the Representative Church Body and shortly afterwards was appointed architect to St. Patrick's Cathedral, as well as to a number of other institutions.

He ran a busy, though, according to his memoirs, unconventional, practice, not keeping ledgers or books and disdaining keeping financial records. As well as his ecclesiastical projects and public building works, he designed a number of large houses around County Kerry and County Mayo. He designed Kylemore Abbey, Connemara, in the 1860s and a few years later the neighbouring neo-Gothic church, a building of international significance. He also designed Mount Falcon (1876), a 9-bedroom Victorian manor estate house which is today a hotel on 100-acres of the original Knox family estate near Ballina.

During the 1890s, he took on George F. Beckett as a pupil and then junior assistant.

He wrote works of fiction, including Culmshire Folk (Cassell, 1873) and John Orlebar, Clerk (Cassell, 1878) and many articles of a historical and genealogical nature.

He was a great-grandfather of actress Peggy Cummins.

== Works ==
Some of his more prominent projects include:

Project	Year Completed	Location	Notes	Image
Kylemore Castle	1868–1875, 1878–1884	Connemara, County Galway, Ireland	The castle was designed by James Franklin Fuller, initially together with Ussher Roberts, in a neo-Gothic style.	Kylemore Castle
Derreen House and Gardens	1871–1873	Near Kenmare, County Kerry, Ireland.	Originally built in the first half of the eighteenth century, the house was remodeled by James Franklin Fuller.	Derreen House and Garden
Ashford Castle	1875–1881	Near Cong, County Galway, Ireland	Victorian rebuilding (in the baronial style) of a medieval castle from the 13th century.	Photo of Ashford Castle from the southwest
Mount Falcon	1876	Near Ballina, County Mayo, Ireland	Baronial manor house built for Utred Augustus Knox.	mount falcon country manor estate house
Farmleigh House	1881–1884	Castleknock, Dublin, Ireland	Once a small Georgian house built in the 18th century, it was subject to a major renovation programme between 1881 and 1884 by James Franklin Fuller.	Farmleigh House
St Catherine's Church	1885	Thomas Street, Dublin, Ireland	Reordering of interior, including the removal of box-pews and two East bays of gallery, relocation of the pulpit to North side of chancel arch.	St Catherine's Church, Dublin
Dromquinna House	Around 1890	Templenoe, County Kerry, Ireland	Built manor house for John Colomb.	
Kenmare Hotel (Park Hotel Kenmare today)	1894	Kenmare, County Kerry, Ireland	Built the hotel for the Great Southern and Western Railway.	
Parknasilla Hotel	1894	Sneem, County Kerry, Ireland	Built the hotel for the Great Southern and Western Railway.	

== Arms ==
Coat of arms of James Franklin Fuller
Notes Confirmed July 1874 by Sir John Bernard Burke, Ulster King of Arms. Crest A horse passant Proper charged on the shoulder with a mullet Or. Escutcheon Argent three bars Gules on a canton of the second a mullet Or. Motto Fortiter Et Recte
