= H. Ormonde McConnell =

Irish Methodist minister and missionary (1904–1998)

Reverend H. Ormonde McConnell MBE
- Born: 27 February 1904; Clonakilty, County Cork, Ireland
- Died: 5 January 5 January 1998 (aged 93); Brookeborough, County Fermanagh, Northern Ireland
- Known for: Methodist minister, missionary, and Haitian Creole orthographer

H. Ormonde McConnell, MBE (27 February 1904 – 5 January 1998) was an Irish Methodist minister and missionary in Haiti.

== Life ==
H. Ormonde McConnell was born in Clonakilty, County Cork on 27 February 1904. The family moved to Holywood, County Down when his father, Henry McConnell, was appointed as a Methodist minister there. At age 23, he competed at the World Convention at Crystal Palace and was part of the winning Irish relay team. He was invited to Lerry in 1927 to enter the Methodist ministry and to take up overseas service. He studied French at Queen's University Belfast, and theology at Edgehill Theological College.

In 1933, he was appointed to Port-au-Prince, Haiti. On 6 July 1934, he married Primrose Beckett in Coke Memorial Church, Kingston, Jamaica. They had four children, Patrick, Marian, Alec and Hazel. The couple lived in Haiti for 36 years. They learned Creole, and developed a written phonetic form of the language, which later became known as McConnell–Laubach orthography. They organised literacy programmes for children and adults and founded the Nouveau Collège Bird. They published a number of books on a wide variety of subjects in Creole.

In 1954, McConnell received permission from President Magloire to build a new church and donated $15,000. McConnell's father-in-law, George F. Beckett, designed the church. When Hurricane Hazel hit Haiti in October 1954, McConnell was the chair of the Red Cross Committee. He was Haiti's administrator for Church World Services. He oversaw the establishment of 40 missions, as well as a farming training programme and the building of an aqueduct. For his work in Haiti, he was awarded the National Order of Honour and Merit by the Haitian government, and an MBE.

He retired in 1970, and the couple returned to live in Holywood, County Down. In 1991, he published his memoir, Co-Workers with God. McConnell died in Northwick House Residential Home for the Elderly, Brookeborough, County Fermanagh on 5 January 1998.
