= Odette Roy Fombrun =

Haitian writer and intellectual (1917–2022)

Odette Fombrun
- Born: 13 June 1917; Port-au-Prince, Haiti
- Died: 23 December 2022 (aged 105); Petion-Ville, Ouest, Haiti

Odette Roy Fombrun (13 June 1917 – 23 December 2022) was a Haitian writer and intellectual.

== Biography ==
Born in Port-au-Prince, Haiti, she graduated in 1935 from the teacher's training college, École Normale d'Institutrices, and in 1945 went to the United States to pursue nursing studies for a year in Boston, Massachusetts. She then opened Haiti's first kindergarten and first professional flower shop.

Fombrun was awarded a Doctor Honoris Causa in December 2002 from the Université Royale d’Haïti in Port-au-Prince (Haïti).

A prolific writer of fiction and non-fiction, she published textbooks, mystery novels, newspaper and magazine articles. Beginning in 1959, Fombrun went into exile for 27 years. Upon her return to Haiti, she was associated with the drafting of the country's new constitution, the organization Ligue Féminine d'Action Sociale (Feminine League for Social Action), and the founding in 2007 of the Fondation Odette Roy Fombrun. She turned 100 in June 2017.

Her historical works include L'Ayiti des Indiens (Port-au-Prince: Deschamps, 1992) and Le Drapeau et les Armes de la République (Port-au-Prince: Deschamps, 1989).

Fombrun died peacefully in her sleep on 23 December 2022, at the age of 105.

== Bibliography ==
- Hall, Michael R. (12 January 2012). Historical Dictionary of Haiti. Scarecrow Press. ISBN 978-0-8108-7549-4.
