= Primrose McConnell =

Irish missionary

- Born: Frances Elaine Beckett; 1906; Foxrock, Dublin, Ireland
- Died: 29 May 1991 (aged 84–85); County Down, Northern Ireland
- Parent: George F. Beckett

Primrose McConnell (1906 – 29 May 1991) was an Irish missionary in Haiti.

== Life ==
Primrose McConnell was born Frances Elaine Beckett in 1906 in Foxrock, Dublin. Her parents were Edith Alice (née Park) and George F. Beckett, an architect. She had a brother and a sister. Samuel Beckett was a cousin, and the two attended Trinity College Dublin at the same time.

On 6 July 1934, she married the Rev. H. Ormonde McConnell in Coke Memorial Church, Kingston, Jamaica. They had four children, Patrick, Marian, Alec and Hazel. He was a Methodist minister posted to Port-au-Prince, Haiti. The couple lived there for 36 years, where they learned Creole, developing a written phonetic form of the language. Using the Laubach teaching method, they organised literacy programmes for children and adults and founded the Nouveau Collège Bird. They published a number of books on a wide variety of subjects in Creole, with the language becoming known as Haitian and being adopted as the official language of Haiti with French.

McConnell enlisted her father to design a new Methodist church in Port-au-Prince, which opened in 1954. She was also known as a gifted musician, playing the piano and organ as well as singing. The couple retired in 1970 and returned to Ireland. McConnell died on 29 May 1991, and is buried at Holywood, County Down. In Port-au-Prince, a thanksgiving service was held for her in the church.
