= Christophe Charles =

Haitian poet (born 1951)

Christophe Philippe Charles (born 1951) is a Haitian poet. Born in Port-au-Prince, Charles received a philosophy degree from the University of Haiti. One of his best-known poems is Désastre (1975).
