= Max Beauvoir =

Haitian biochemist and Vodou religious leader

- Born: Max Gesner Beauvoir; August 25, 1936; Haiti
- Died: September 12, 2015 (aged 79); Port-au-Prince, Haiti
- Other name: The Pope of Voodoo
- Education: University of Paris; City College of New York
- Occupations: Houngan, biochemist, chemical engineer
- Known for: Vodou leader
- Title: Ati, High Priest
- Spouse: Elisabeth Marchand
- Children: Estelle Manuel, Rachel Beauvoir-Dominique
- Parent(s): Dr. Gesner Beauvoir, Paulette Icart

Max Gesner Beauvoir (August 25, 1936 – September 12, 2015) was a Haitian biochemist and houngan. Beauvoir held one of the highest titles of Voudou priesthood, Ati or "Supreme Serviteur" (supreme servant), a title given to Houngans and Mambos (Voudou priests and priestesses) who have a great and very deep knowledge of the religion, and status within the religion. As Supreme Serviteur, Max was seen as a high authority within Vodou.

== Biography ==
Beauvoir was born on August 25, 1936, in Haiti. He left Haiti in the 1950s and graduated in 1958 from City College of New York with a degree in chemistry. He continued his studies at the Sorbonne from 1959 to 1962, when he graduated with a degree in biochemistry. First employed by a mining company in the mountains of Nimba (Liberia), he returned to the U.S. where, in 1965, at Cornell Medical Center, he supervised a team in synthesizing metabolic steroids. This led him to a job at an engineering company in northern New Jersey, and later to a period as engineer at Digital Equipment Company in Massachusetts. His interest in steroids led him to experiment with hydrocortisone synthesized from agave plants; however, the death of his father led him to move back to Haiti in January 1973 where he found employ at Plantation Dauphin, a large agave plantation, then with Société Haitiano-Américaine de Développement Agricole.

In 1974, with his wife Elisabeth, he opened a restaurant/night-club in his home in the village of Mariani. They pioneered the presentation of voodoo in an educational format to a paying public and, in 1975, both were formally initiated voodoo priests. This is when they founded Le Péristyle de Mariani, a Hounfour. In the following years, as Beauvoir built up his reputation to the public, he deepened his knowledge of the religion by visiting and paying homage to other branches of Vodou around the Haitian countryside. During this period, he founded the Group for Studies and Research on the African Tradition (French: Groupe d'Etudes et de Recherches Traditionnelles, GERT) with his daughters and a group of like-minded scholars.

The ruling Duvalier family largely ignored him until 1985 when the regime was threatened. When he was contacted by the National Palace for consultation, he responded by founding the Bòde Nasyonal in December 1985, the first reunion of important Houngan leaders of all the branches of Vodou to urge the Duvaliers to do more to meet the needs of the poor. This advice turned out to be too late to stop the fall of the regime, but this first organization, the Bòde Nasyonal, was essential later in 1986 to counter the effects of the post-Duvalier dechoukaj violence. Initially targeting the Tonton Macoutes paramilitary which had been used by the Duvalier regime to oppress the Haitian people, the violent crowds, at times manipulated by Christian churches or by profiteers, turned against Vodou practitioners and their temples. The resistance that Max Beauvoir led to protect innocent Vodou victims would earn him the respect of the entire Vodou community.

In 1996, Beauvoir founded The Temple of Yehwe, a Washington, D.C.–based non-profit organization for the promotion of education concerning Afro-American religion. In 1997, he became involved with the creation of the KOSANBA group at the University of California, Santa Barbara.

In Port-au-Prince, Max G. Beauvoir died on Saturday, September 12, 2015, aged 79.

== Involvement with KNVA ==
In 2005, he launched the Federasyon Nasyonal Vodou Ayisyen, which he later renamed in 2008 as Konfederasyon Nasyonal Vodou Ayisyen; he serves as "chef Supreme" or "Ati Nasyonal" of the organization, which is an attempt to organize the defense of Vodou in the country against defamation.

== In media ==
- Beauvoir was interviewed in 1982 by Canadian ethnobotanist Wade Davis for his 1985 book The Serpent and the Rainbow.
- Beauvoir held a patent on the process of obtaining hecogenin from plant leaves until 1993.
