= Bois Verna =

- Neighborhood
- Location in Haiti
- Coordinates: 18°32′11″N 72°19′48″W
- Country: Haiti
- Department: Ouest
- Arrondissement: Port-au-Prince

Bois Verna is a neighborhood of Port-au-Prince, Haiti. It has one of the largest concentration of the historic Haitian gingerbread style houses present.

== Attractions ==
Bois Verna is home to a number of gingerbread houses.

Maison Dufort, a house designed by Haitian architect Léon Mathon, one of the founders of the architectural style of the late 19th century, has undergone restoration since the 2010 Haiti earthquake with collaborative efforts from Belgium, California and local Haitians.
