= Claudine Michel =

Claudine Michel is the editor of the Journal of Haitian Studies and a professor emerita of Black studies at the University of California, Santa Barbara. Michel is the Director of the UCSB Center for Black Studies Research.

In 2004, Michel co-edited the Black Studies Reader, an early volume highlighting a broad range of significant Black Studies Scholars such as Robin D.G. Kelly, Katie Geneva Cannon, Angela Davis, Jacquelyn Grant, Elsa Barkley Brown, Stuart Hall, and Richard Brent Turner. This volume shows how Black Studies Departments emerged out of civil rights struggles in the early 1960s. The University of California Santa Barbara, where Michel was faculty, has one of the earliest Black Studies Programs, established in 1969.

Michel is a Haitian native and practitioner of Haitian Vodou who co-edited the first emic (insider) volume on Vodou, "Haitian Vodou: Spirit, Myth and Reality," with Patrick Belgarde-Smith. Mary Ann Clark at Yavapai College, in a review in Nova Religio, called this volume, "another extraordinary contribution by the editors and publisher."

== 2010 Haiti earthquake ==
Michel believes that aid after the 2010 Haiti earthquake is too top-to-bottom, resulting in Haiti "losing [its] soul".

== Works ==
- Etude Comparative des Théories du Développement de l'Enfant (DeBoeck/Université, Bruxelles/Paris, 1994). Co-author.
- Aspects Moraux et Educatifs du Vodou Haitien (Le Natal, Port-au-Prince, Haiti, 1995)
- Haitian Vodou: Spirit, Myth, and Reality (Indiana University Press, 2006). Co-author.
- Vodou in Haitian Life and Culture: Invisible Powers" (2006). Written by Patrick Bellegarde-Smith, edited by Michel.
- Offerings: Continuity and Transformation in Haitian Vodou (Oxford Press)

== Awards and honors ==
Michel received the Haitian Studies Association Service Award in 2008, particularly for her work as editor of the Journal of Haitian Studies.

In 2017 Michel was named Executive Director of the Haitian Studies Association

Upon retirement for UCSB, Michel was named an Emeritus Professor, and The Claudine Michel Fund at UC Santa Barbara was created in her honor, and awards "diverse faculty, staff and/or students".

== Sources ==
- "A Conversation with Claudine Michel". Center for Culture, Society, and Religion. Retrieved 2022-11-01.
