= Haitian Creole =

French-based creole language

- kreyòl ayisyen
- Pronunciation: [kɣejɔl ajisjɛ̃]
- Native to: Haiti
- Region: Hispaniola Island
- Ethnicity: Haitians
- Native speakers: 13 million (2020)
- Language family: French Creole: Circum-Caribbean French; Haitian Creole
- Writing system: Latin (Haitian Creole alphabet)

Official status
- Official language in: Haiti
- Recognised minority language in: Bahamas; Cuba; Costa Rica
- Regulated by: Akademi Kreyòl Ayisyen (Haitian Creole Academy)

Language codes
- ISO 639-1: ht
- ISO 639-2: hat
- ISO 639-3: hat
- Glottolog: hait1244 Haitian
- Linguasphere: 51-AAC-cb
- IETF: ht
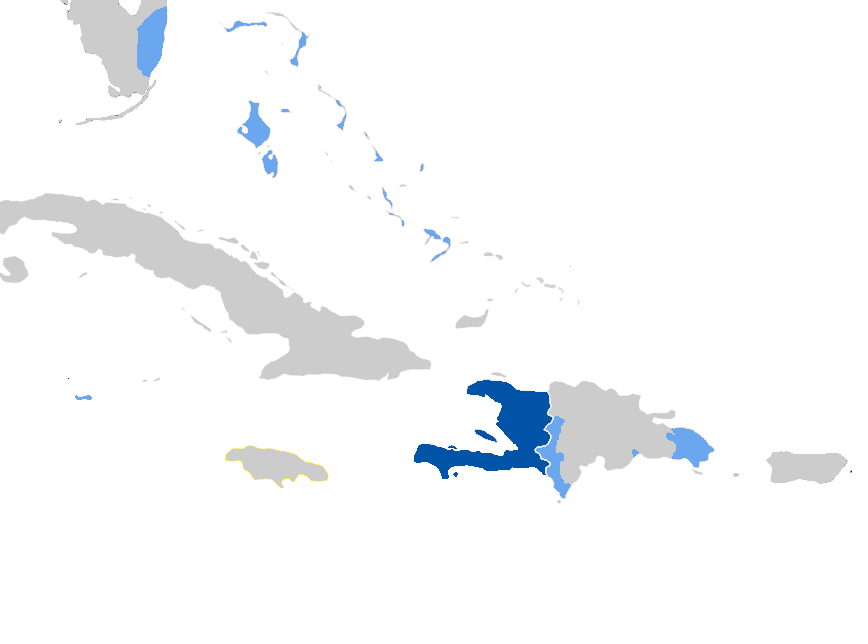
- Distribution of Haitian Creole. Areas in dark blue are where it is spoken by a majority; areas in light blue are where it is spoken by a minority.

Haitian Creole (Haitian Creole: kreyòl ayisyen, [kɣejɔl ajisjɛ̃]), or simply Creole (kreyòl), is an Afro-francophone-based creole language with a Romance foundation and significant Atlantic-Congo structural influences. It is spoken by over 13 million people worldwide, primarily Haitian citizens and the Haitian diaspora. It is one of the two official languages of Haiti (the other being French), where it is the native language of the vast majority of the population. It is also the most widely spoken creole language in the world.

The three main dialects of Haitian Creole are the Northern, Central, and Southern dialects; the Northern dialect is predominantly spoken in Cap-Haïtien, the Central in Port-au-Prince, and the Southern in Les Cayes.

The language emerged from contact between French settlers and enslaved Africans during the Atlantic slave trade in the French colony of Saint-Domingue (now Haiti) in the 17th and 18th centuries. Although its vocabulary largely derives from 18th-century French, its grammar is that of a West African Volta–Congo language branch, particularly the Fongbe and Igbo languages. It also has influences from other West African languages as well as from Spanish, English, Portuguese and Taíno. It is not mutually intelligible with standard French. Some estimate that Haitians are the largest community in the world to speak a modern creole language; others estimate that more people speak Nigerian Pidgin.

Ambassador Hervé Denis discusses the vital relationship between Haiti and its diaspora in Haitian Creole

Haitian Creole's use in communities and schools has been contentious since at least the 19th century. Some Haitians view French as inextricably linked to the legacy of colonialism and a language compelled on the population by conquerors, while Haitian Creole has been maligned by Francophones as an undereducated person's French. Until the late 20th century, Haitian presidents spoke only standard French to their fellow citizens, and until the 21st century, all instruction at Haitian elementary schools was in standard French, a second language to most of their students.

Haitian Creole is also spoken in regions with Haitian immigrant communities, including other Caribbean islands, French Guiana, Martinique, France, Canada (particularly Quebec) and the United States (including the U.S. state of Louisiana). It is related to Antillean Creole, spoken in the Lesser Antilles, and to other French-based creole languages.

== Etymology ==
The word creole comes from the Portuguese term crioulo, which means "a person raised in one's house" and from the Latin creare, which means "to create, make, bring forth, produce, beget". In the New World, the term originally referred to Europeans born and raised in overseas colonies (as opposed to the European-born peninsulares). To be "as rich as a Creole" at one time was a popular saying boasted in Paris during the colonial years of Haiti (then named Saint-Domingue), for being the most lucrative colony in the world. The noun Creole soon began to refer to the language spoken there as well, as it still is today.

== Origins ==
Haitian Creole contains elements from both the Romance group of Indo-European languages through its superstrate, French, as well as significant influences from African languages. There are many theories on the formation of the Haitian Creole language.

One theory estimates that Haitian Creole developed between 1680 and 1740. During the 17th century, French and Spanish colonizers produced tobacco, cotton, and sugar cane on the island. Throughout this period, the population was made of roughly equal numbers of engagés (white workers), gens de couleur libres (free people of colour) and slaves. The economy shifted more decisively into sugar production about 1690, just before the French colony of Saint-Domingue was officially recognized in 1697. The sugar crops needed a much larger labor force, which led to an increase in slave trafficking. In the 18th century an estimated 800,000 West Africans were enslaved and brought to Saint-Domingue. As the slave population increased, the proportion of French-speaking colonists decreased.

Many African slaves in the colony had come from Niger-Congo-speaking territory, and particularly speakers of Kwa languages, such as Gbe from West Africa and the Central Tano languages, and Bantu languages from Central Africa. Singler suggests that the number of Bantu speakers decreased while the number of Kwa speakers increased, with Gbe being the most dominant group. The first fifty years of Saint‑Domingue's sugar boom coincided with emergent Gbe predominance in the French Caribbean. In the interval during which Singler hypothesizes the language evolved, the Gbe population was around 50% of the kidnapped enslaved population.

Classical French (français classique) and langues d'oïl (Norman, Poitevin and Saintongeais dialects, Gallo and Picard) were spoken during the 17th and 18th centuries in Saint‑Domingue, as well as in New France and French West Africa. Slaves lacked a common means of communication and as a result would try to learn French to communicate with one another, though most were denied a formal education. With the constant trafficking and enslavement of Africans, the language became increasingly distinct from French. The language was also picked up by other members of the community and became used by the majority of those born in what is now Haiti.

=== Saint-Domingue Creole French ===
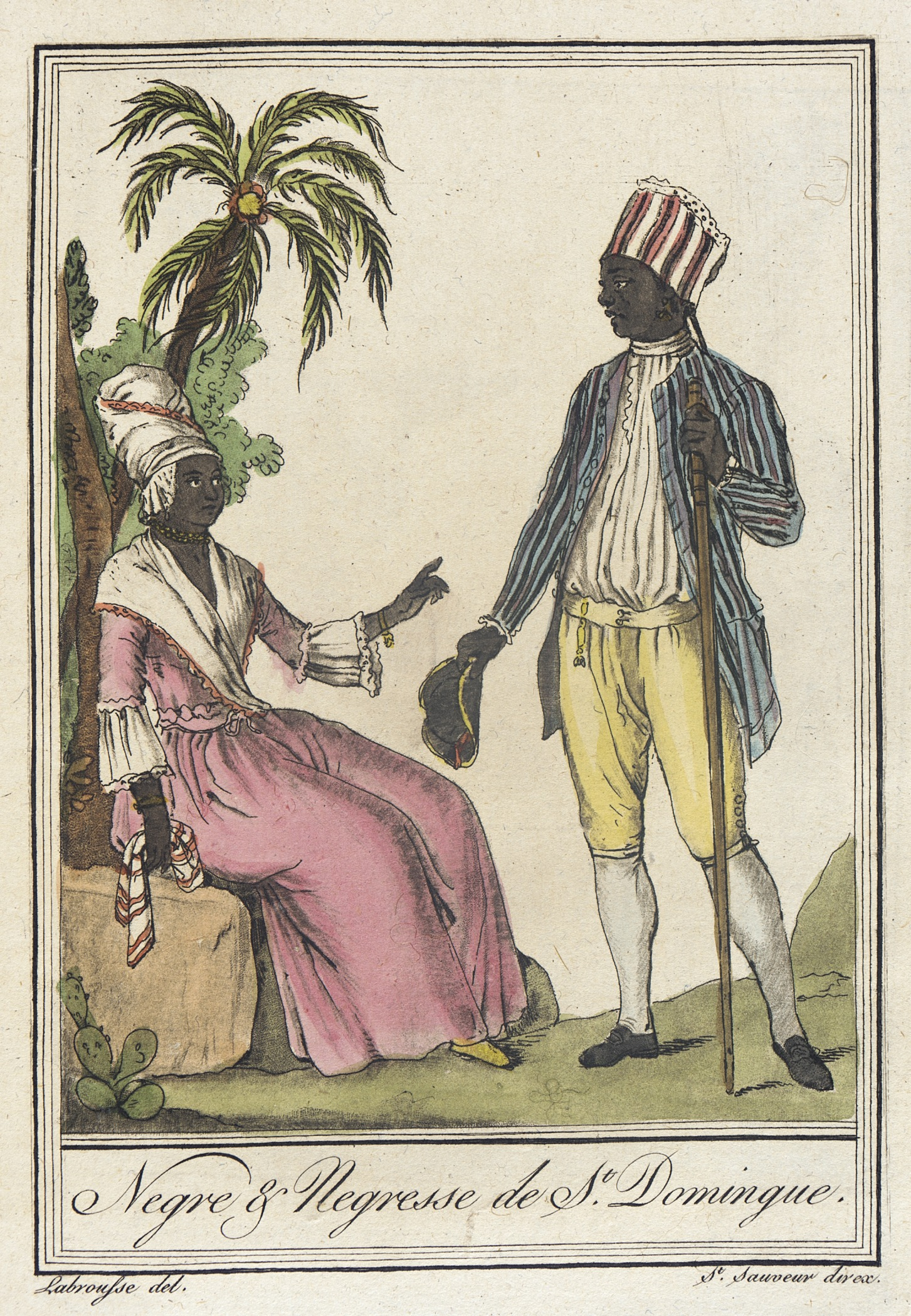
A rich Creole planter of Saint-Domingue with his wife

In Saint-Domingue, people of all classes spoke Creole French. There were both lower and higher registers of the language, depending on education and class. Creole served as a lingua franca throughout the West Indies.

L'Entrepreneur. Mo sorti apprend, Mouché, qué vou té éprouvé domage dan traversée.

Le Capitaine: Ça vrai.

L'Entr: Vou crére qué navire à vou gagné bisoin réparations?

Le C: Ly té carené anvant nou parti, mai coup z'ouragan là mété moué dan cas fair ly bay encor nion radoub.

L'Entr: Ly fair d'iau en pile?

Le C: Primié jours aprés z'orage, nou té fair trente-six pouces par vingt-quatre heurs; mai dan beau tem mo fair yo dégagé ça mo pu, et tancher miyor possible, nou fair à présent necqué treize pouces.

The Entrepreneur: I just learned, sir, that you garnered damages in your crossing.

The Captain: That's true.

The Entrepreneur: Do you believe that your ship needs repair?

The Captain: It careened before we left, but the blow from the hurricane put me in the position of getting it refitted again.

The Entrepreneur: Is it taking on a lot of water?

The Captain: The first days after the storm, we took on thirty-six inches in twenty-four hours; but in clear weather, I made them take as much of it out as I was able, and attached it the best we possibly could; we're presently taking on not even thirteen inches.

The flag of the Empire of Haiti (1804–1806)

Haïti, l'an 1er, 5e, jour de l'indépendance.

Chère maman moi,

Ambassadeurs à nous, partis pour chercher argent France, moi voulé écrire à vous par yo, pour dire vous combien nous contens. Français bon, oublié tout. Papas nous révoltés contre yo, papas nous tués papas yo, fils yo, gérens yo, papas nous brûlées habitations yo. Bagasse, eux viennent trouver nous! et dis nous, vous donner trente millions de gourdes à nous et nous laisser Haïti vous? Vous venez acheter du sucre, du café, de l’indigo chez nous? Mais vous payez la moitié du droit à nous. Vous pensez, chère maman, que nous avons accepté le marché. Le président nous a embrassés, bon papa Makau. Yo bu santé roi de France, santé Boyer, santé Christophe, santé Haïti, santé indépendance. Puis yo dansé Balcindé et Bai chi ca colé avec Haïtiens. Moi pas pouvé dire vous combien tout ça noble et beau.

Venir voir fils à vous sur habitation, maman moi, li donné vous cassave, gouillave et pimentade. Il est bien content si vous pouvez mener la blanche France pour épouse. Dis-lui, si ben heureuse. Nous plus tuer blancs, frères, amis, et camarades à nous.

Fils à vous, embrassez-vous, chère maman, moi.

Congo, Haïtien libre et indépendant, au Trou-Salé.

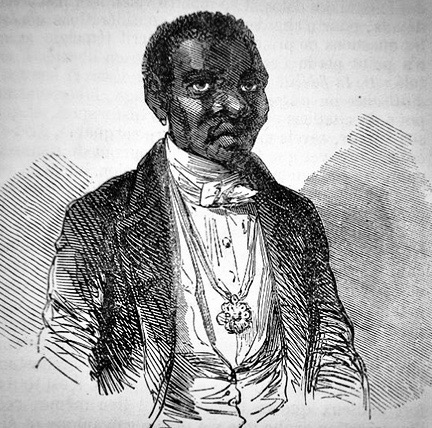
A Haitian planter

Haiti, 1st year, 5th day of independence.

My dear mother,

Our ambassadors left to get money from France, I want to write to you through them, to tell you how much we are happy. The French are good, they forgot everything. Our fathers revolted against them, our fathers killed their fathers, sons, managers, and our fathers burned down their plantations. Well, they came to find us, and told us, "you give thirty million gourdes to us and we'll leave Haiti to you? (And we replied) Will you come buy sugar, coffee, and indigo from us? You will pay only half directly to us." Do you believe my dear mother, that we accepted the deal? Our President hugged the good papa Makau (the French ambassador). They drank to the health of the King of France, to the health of Boyer, to the health of Christophe, to the health of Haiti, to independence. Then they danced Balcindé and Bai chi ca colé with Haitian women. I can't tell you how beautiful and noble all of this is.

Come see your son at his plantation, my mother, he will give you cassava, goyava, and pimentade. He will be happy if you can bring him a white Frenchwoman for a wife. Tell her, if you please. We won't kill anymore whites, brothers, friends, and camarades of ours.

Your son hugs you, my dear mother.

Congo, free and independent Haitian, at Trou-Salé.

=== Differences between Haitian Creole and French ===
Haitian Creole and French have similar pronunciations and also share many lexical items. However, many cognate terms actually have different meanings. For example, as Valdman mentions in Haitian Creole: Structure, Variation, Status, Origin, the word for "frequent" in French is fréquent; however, its cognate in Haitian Creole frekan means 'insolent, rude, and impertinent' and usually refers to people. In addition, the grammars of Haitian Creole and French are very different. For example, in Haitian Creole, verbs are not conjugated as they are in French. Additionally, Haitian Creole possesses different phonetics from standard French; however, it is similar in phonetic structure. The phrase-structure is another similarity between Haitian Creole and French but differs slightly in that it contains details from its African substratum language.

Both Haitian Creole and French have also experienced semantic change: words that had a single meaning in the 17th century have changed or have been replaced in both languages. For example, "Ki jan ou rele?" ("What is your name?") corresponds to the French "Comment vous appelez‑vous ?". Although the average French speaker would not understand this phrase, every word in it is in fact of French origin: qui "who"; genre "manner"; vous "you", and héler "to call", but the verb héler has been replaced by appeler in modern French and reduced to a meaning of "to flag down".

Claire Lefebvre proposed the theory of relexification, arguing that the process of relexification (the replacement of the phonological representation of a substratum lexical item with the phonological representation of a superstratum lexical item, so that the Haitian creole lexical item looks like French, but works like the substratum language(s)) was central in the development of Haitian Creole.

The Fon language, also known as the Fongbe language, is a modern Gbe language native to Benin, Nigeria and Togo in West Africa. This language has a grammatical structure similar to Haitian Creole, possibly making Creole a relexification of Fon with vocabulary from French. The two languages are often compared:

French	Fon	Haitian Creole	English
la maison	afe a	kay la	the house

=== Taíno influence ===
There are a number of Taíno influences in Haitian Creole; many objects, fruit and animal names are either haitianized or have a similar pronunciation. Many towns, places or sites have their official name being a translation of the Taíno word.

Taíno	Haitian Creole	Meaning
Amani	Amani-y	The nickname of the town of Saint-Marc and famous beach
Ayiti, Ayti	Ayiti, Haiti	The name of the country and the island. It means "Land of Great Mountains"
Barbacoa	Babekyou	Barbecue
Bajacu	Bayakou	The northern star, dawn, a Vodoun Loa associated with the star
Batey	Batèy	Batey, a settlement around a sugar mill
Caiman	Kayiman	Alligator
Caimito	Kayimit	Star apple
Canari	Kannari	A clay pot to keep water cool
Canoa	Kannòt	Canoe
Casabe	Kasav	Cassava
Casique	Kasik	Cacique, an indigenous chief
Cayo	Okay, or Les Cayes	A commune and seaport in the Sud département of Haiti
Gonaibo	Gonayiv, or Gonaïves	The biggest city and capital of Artibonite
Guanabo	Gonav, Gonâve or Lagonav	The biggest satellite island of Hispaniola and last refuge of the Taíno
Guayaba	Gwayav	Guava
Hamaca	Amaka	Hammock
Jatibonico	Latibonit, or Artibonite	The longest river of Hispaniola and the biggest and most populous département of Haiti. In Taíno the word means "sacred water".
Lambi	Lanbi	Conch
Mabi	Mabi	A bitter drink known in the West Indies as Mauby
Maboya	Mabouya	Iguana
Mahis	Mayi	Maize
Mamey	Mamey, or Abriko	The nickname of the town of Abricots
Manati	Lamanten	Manatee
Mani	Manba	Peanut butter
Sabana	Savann	Savanna
Tiburon	Tibiwon	The same word means "Tiburon", a coastal town in the South Peninsula (also called Tiburon Peninsula) and a river near the town
Yaguana	Leyogàn, Léogane	A coastal town south of Port-au-Prince and capital of the cacicat of Xaragua
Yucahu	Loko, or Louquo	The patron of healers and plants, a Vodoun Loa related to Yucahu, the supreme deity of the Taíno

== History ==
=== Early development ===
Haitian Creole developed in the 17th and 18th centuries in the colony of Saint-Domingue, in a setting that mixed speakers of various Niger–Congo languages with French colonists. In the early 1940s under President Élie Lescot, attempts were made to standardize the language. American linguistic expert Frank Laubach and Irish Methodist missionary H. Ormonde McConnell developed a standardized Haitian Creole orthography. Although some regarded the orthography highly, it was generally not well received. Its orthography was standardized in 1979. That same year Haitian Creole was elevated in status by the Act of 18 September 1979. The Institut Pédagogique National established an official orthography for Creole, and slight modifications were made over the next two decades. For example, the hyphen (-) is no longer used, nor is the apostrophe. The only accent mark retained is the grave accent in ⟨è⟩ and ⟨ò⟩.

=== Becoming an official language ===
The Constitution of 1987 upgraded Haitian Creole to a national language alongside French. It classified French as the langue d'instruction or "language of instruction", and Creole was classified as an outil d'enseignement or a "tool of education". The Constitution of 1987 names both Haitian Creole and French as the official languages, but recognizes Haitian Creole as the only language that all Haitians hold in common. French is spoken by only a small percentage of citizens.

=== Literature development ===
Even without government recognition, by the end of the 19th century, there were already literary texts written in Haitian Creole such as Oswald Durand's Choucoune and Georges Sylvain's Cric? Crac!. Félix Morisseau-Leroy was another influential author of Haitian Creole work. Since the 1980s, many educators, writers, and activists have written literature in Haitian Creole. In 2001, Open Gate: An Anthology of Haitian Creole Poetry was published. It was the first time a collection of Haitian Creole poetry was published in both Haitian Creole and English. On 28 October 2004, the Haitian daily Le Matin first published an entire edition in Haitian Creole in observance of the country's newly instated "Creole Day". Haitian Creole writers often use different literary strategies throughout their works, such as code-switching, to increase the audience's knowledge on the language. Literature in Haitian Creole is also used to educate the public on the dictatorial social and political forces in Haiti.

==== Notable Haitian Creole–language writers ====
- Louis-Philippe Dalembert (b. 1962), poet and novelist
- Frankétienne (1936–2025), poet, playwright, painter, musician, activist
- Ady Jean-Gardy (b. 1967), international press activist
- Josaphat-Robert Large (1942–2017), poet, novelist and art critic
- Félix Morisseau-Leroy (1912–1998), poet and playwright
- Elsie Suréna (b. 1956), writer and visual artist
- Lyonel Trouillot (b. 1956), poet and novelist

== Sociolinguistics ==
=== Role in society ===
Although both French and Haitian Creole are official languages in Haiti, French is often considered the high language and Haitian Creole the low language in the diglossic relationship of these two languages in society. That is to say, for the minority of Haitian population that is bilingual, the use of these two languages largely depends on the social context: standard French is used more in public, especially in formal situations, whereas Haitian Creole is used more on a daily basis and is often heard in ordinary conversation.

A large portion of the population in Haiti speaks only Haitian Creole, whether under formal or informal conditions:

French plays no role in the very formal situation of a Haitian peasant (more than 80% of the population make a living from agriculture) presiding at a family gathering after the death of a member, or at the worship of the family lwa or voodoo spirits, or contacting a Catholic priest for a church baptism, marriage, or solemn mass, or consulting a physician, nurse, or dentist, or going to a civil officer to declare a death or birth.

— Yves Dejean

=== Use in educational system ===
In most schools, French is still the preferred language for teaching. Generally speaking, Creole is more used in public schools, as that is where most children of ordinary families who speak Creole attend school.

Historically, the education system has been French-dominant. Except the children of elites, many had to drop out of school because learning French was very challenging to them and they had a hard time to follow up. The Bernard Reform of 1978 tried to introduce Creole as the teaching language in the first four years of primary school; however, the reform overall was not very successful. The use of Creole has grown; after the earthquake in 2010, basic education became free and more accessible to the monolingual masses. In the 2010s, the government has attempted to expand the use of Creole and improve the school system.

== Orthography ==
Haitian Creole has a phonemic orthography with highly regular spelling, except for proper nouns and foreign words. According to the official standardized orthography, Haitian Creole is composed of the following 32 symbols: ⟨a⟩, ⟨an⟩, ⟨b⟩, ⟨ch⟩, ⟨d⟩, ⟨e⟩, ⟨è⟩, ⟨en⟩, ⟨f⟩, ⟨g⟩, ⟨h⟩, ⟨i⟩, ⟨j⟩, ⟨k⟩, ⟨l⟩, ⟨m⟩, ⟨n⟩, ⟨ng⟩, ⟨o⟩, ⟨ò⟩, ⟨on⟩, ⟨ou⟩, ⟨oun⟩, ⟨p⟩, ⟨r⟩, ⟨s⟩, ⟨t⟩, ⟨ui⟩, ⟨v⟩, ⟨w⟩, ⟨y⟩, and ⟨z⟩. The letters ⟨c⟩ and ⟨u⟩ are always associated with another letter (in the multigraphs ⟨ch⟩, ⟨ou⟩, ⟨oun⟩, and ⟨ui⟩). The Haitian Creole alphabet has no ⟨q⟩ or ⟨x⟩; when ⟨x⟩ is used in loanwords and proper nouns, it represents the sounds /ks/, /kz/, or /gz/.

Consonants
Haitian orthography	IPA	Examples	English approximation
b	b	bagay	bow
ch	ʃ	cho	shoe
d	d	dous	do
f	f	fig	festival
g	ɡ	gwo	gain
h	h	hountò	hotel
j	ʒ	jedi	measure
k	k	kle	sky
l	l	liv	clean
m	m	machin	mother
n	n	nòt	note
ng	ŋ	bilding	feeling
p	p	pase	spy
r	ɣ	rezon	between go and loch
s	s	sis	six
t	t	tout	to
v	v	vyann	vent
z	z	zewo	zero
Non-native consonants
dj	dʒ	djaz	jazz
Semivowels
w	w	wi	we
y	j	pye	yes
Semivowel followed by vowel (digraph)
ui	ɥi	uit	roughly like sweet

Vowels
Haitian orthography	IPA	Examples	English approximation
a (or à before an n)	a	abako pàn	bra
e	e	ale	hey
è	ɛ	fèt	festival
i	i	lide	machine
o	o	oranj	blow
ò	ɔ	deyò	sort
ou	u	nou	you
Nasal vowels
an (when not followed by a vowel)	ã	anpil	many
en (when not followed by a vowel)	ɛ̃	mwen	en [ɛ]
on (when not followed by a vowel)	ɔ̃	tonton	tone [o]
oun (rarely)	ũ	oungan	No English equivalent; nasalized [u]

- There are no silent letters in the Haitian Creole orthography.
- All sounds are always spelled the same, except when a vowel carries a grave accent ⟨`⟩ before ⟨n⟩, which makes it an oral vowel instead of a nasal vowel:
  - ⟨en⟩ for /ɛ̃/ and ⟨èn⟩ for /ɛn/;
  - ⟨on⟩ for /ɔ̃/ and ⟨òn⟩ for /ɔn/; and
  - ⟨an⟩ for /ã/ and ⟨àn⟩ for /an/.
- When immediately followed by a vowel in a word, the digraphs denoting the nasal vowels (⟨an⟩, ⟨en⟩, ⟨on⟩, and sometimes ⟨oun⟩) are pronounced as an oral vowel followed by /n/.
- There is some ambiguity in the pronunciation of the high vowels of the letters ⟨i⟩ and ⟨ou⟩ when followed in spelling by ⟨n⟩. Common words such as moun ("person") and machin ("car") end with consonantal /n/, while very few words, mostly adopted from African languages, contain nasalized high vowels, as in oungan ("vodou priest").
- The diphthong /ɥi/ is extremely rare, and maybe only exists in the common word uit (← French huit) "eight". Most other instances of this diphthong have been replaced by /wi/, e.g. fwi (← fruit) "fruit", nwit (← nuit) "night".

=== Haitian orthography debate ===
The first technical orthography for Haitian Creole was developed in 1940 by H. Ormonde McConnell and Primrose McConnell, Irish Methodist missionaries. It was later revised with the help of Frank Laubach, resulting in the creation of what is known as the McConnell–Laubach orthography.

The McConnell–Laubach orthography received substantial criticism from members of the Haitian elite. Haitian scholar Charles Pressoir critiqued the McConnell–Laubach orthography for its lack of codified front rounded vowels, which are typically used only by francophone elites. Another criticism was of the broad use of the letters ⟨k⟩, ⟨w⟩, and ⟨y⟩, which Pressoir argued looked "too American". This criticism of the "American look" of the orthography was shared by many educated Haitians, who also criticized its association with Protestantism. The last of Pressoir's criticisms was that "the use of the circumflex to mark nasalized vowels" treated nasal sounds differently from the way they are represented in French, which he feared would inhibit the learning of French.

The creation of the orthography was essentially an articulation of the language ideologies of those involved and brought out political and social tensions between competing groups. A large portion of this tension lay in the ideology held by many that the French language is superior, which led to resentment of the language by some Haitians and an admiration for it from others. This orthographical controversy boiled down to an attempt to unify a conception of Haitian national identity. Where ⟨k⟩ and ⟨w⟩ seemed too Anglo-Saxon and American imperialistic, ⟨c⟩ and ⟨ou⟩ were symbolic of French colonialism.

=== French-based orthography ===
When Haiti was still a colony of France, edicts by the French government were often written in a French-lexicon creole and read aloud to the slave population. The first written text of Haitian Creole was composed in the French-lexicon in a poem called Lisette quitté la plaine in 1757 by Duvivier de la Mahautière, a white Creole planter.

Before Haitian Creole orthography was standardized in the late 20th century, spelling varied, but was based on subjecting spoken Haitian Creole to written French, a language whose spelling has a complicated relation to pronunciation. Unlike the phonetic orthography, French orthography of Haitian Creole is not standardized and varies according to the writer; some use exact French spelling, others adjust the spelling of certain words to represent pronunciation of the cognate in Haitian Creole, removing the silent letters. For example:
Li ale travay nan maten (lit. "He goes to work in the morning") could be transcribed as:

- Li ale travay nan maten,
- Lui aller travail nans matin, or
- Li aller travail nans matin.

== Grammar ==
Haitian Creole grammar is highly analytical: for example, verbs are not inflected for tense or person, and there is no grammatical gender, which means that adjectives and articles are not inflected according to the noun. The primary word order is subject–verb–object as it is in French and English.

Many grammatical features, particularly the pluralization of nouns and indication of possession, are indicated by appending certain markers, like yo, to the main word. There has been a debate going on for some years as to whether these markers are affixes or clitics, and if punctuation such as the hyphen should be used to connect them to the word.

Although the language's vocabulary has many words related to their French-language cognates, its sentence structure is like that of the West African Fon language.

Haitian Creole	Fon	French	English
bekàn mwen bike my	keke che bike my	ma bécane my bike	my bike
bekàn mwen yo bike my PL	keke che le bike my PL	mes bécanes my bikes	my bikes

=== Pronouns ===
There are six pronouns: first, second, and third person, each in both singular, and plural; all are of French etymological origin. There is no difference between direct and indirect objects.

Haitian Creole		Fon	French	English
Long form	Short form	Fon	French	English
mwen	m	nyɛ̀	je	I
mwen	m	nyɛ̀	j'	I
mwen	m	nyɛ̀	me	me
mwen	m	nyɛ̀	m'	me
mwen	m	nyɛ̀	moi	me
ou (Note: sometimes the French pronoun on ("one", "[generic] you", "[singular] they") is translated to Haitian Creole as ou and other times it is translated as yo) (Note: sometimes ou is written as w and in the sample phrases below, w indicates ou.)	w	hwɛ̀	tu	you (singular), thou (archaic)
ou	w	hwɛ̀	te	you (singular), thou (archaic)
ou	w	hwɛ̀	t'	you (singular), thou (archaic)
ou	w	hwɛ̀	toi	you (singular), thou (archaic)
li (Note: in the northern part of Haiti, li is often shortened to i as in Guadeloupe, Martinique and the other Lesser Antilles.)	l	é, éyɛ̀	il	he
li	l	é, éyɛ̀	elle	she, her
li	l	é, éyɛ̀	le	him, it
li	l	é, éyɛ̀	la	her, it
li	l	é, éyɛ̀	l'	him, her, it
li	l	é, éyɛ̀	lui	him, her, it
nou	n	mí	nous	we, us
nou	n	mí	vous	you (plural) (Note: in southern Haiti, the second person plural is zòt)
yo (Note: sometimes the French pronoun on ("one", "[generic] you", "[singular] they") is translated to Haitian Creole as yo and other times it is translated as ou)	y	yé	ils	they
yo	y	yé	elles	they
yo	y	yé	les	them
yo	y	yé	leur	them
yo	y	yé	eux	them

=== Possessive pronouns ===
==== Singular ====
Haitian Creole	French	English
pa mwen an	le mien	mine (masculine)
pa mwen an	la mienne	mine (feminine)
pa ou a	le tien	yours (masculine)
pa ou a	la tienne	yours (feminine)
pa li a	le sien	his/hers/its (masculine)
pa li a	la sienne	his/hers/its (feminine)
pa nou an	le/la nôtre	ours
pa nou an	le/la vôtre	yours ("of you-PLURAL")
pa yo a	le/la leur	theirs

==== Plural ====
Haitian Creole	French	English
pa mwen yo	les miens	mine
pa mwen yo	les miennes	mine
pa ou yo	les tiens	yours
pa ou yo	les tiennes	yours
pa li yo	les siens	his/hers/its
pa li yo	les siennes	his/hers/its
pa nou yo	les nôtres	ours
pa nou yo	les vôtres	yours ("of you-PLURAL")
pa yo	les leurs	theirs

=== Plural of nouns ===
Definite nouns are made plural when followed by the word yo; indefinite plural nouns are unmarked.

Haitian Creole	French	English
liv yo	les livres	the books
machin yo	les voitures	the cars
tifi yo met wòb	les filles mettent des robes	the girls put on dresses

=== Possession ===
Possession is indicated by placing the possessor or possessive pronoun after the item possessed. In the Capois dialect of northern Haiti, a or an is placed before the possessive pronoun. Note, however, that this is not considered the standard Kreyòl most often heard in the media or used in writing.

Possession does not indicate definiteness ("my friend" as opposed to "a friend of mine"), and possessive constructions are often followed by a definite article.

Haitian Creole	French	English
lajan li	son argent	his money
lajan li	son argent	her money
fanmi mwen	ma famille	my family
fanmi m	ma famille	my family
fanmi an m (Capois dialect)	ma famille	my family
kay yo	leur maison	their house
kay yo	leurs maisons	their houses
papa ou	ton père	your father
papa w	ton père	your father
chat Pyè a	le chat de Pierre	Pierre's cat
chèz Marie a	la chaise de Marie	Marie's chair
zanmi papa Jean	l'ami du père de Jean	Jean's father's friend
papa vwazen zanmi nou	le père du voisin de notre ami	our friend's neighbor's father

=== Indefinite article ===
The language has two indefinite articles, on and yon (pronounced /õ/ and /jõ/) which correspond to French un and une. Yon is derived from the French il y a un ("there is a"). Both are used only with singular nouns, and are placed before the noun:

Haitian Creole	French	English
on kouto	un couteau	a knife
yon kouto	un couteau	a knife
on kravat	une cravate	a necktie
yon kravat	une cravate	a necktie

=== Definite article ===
In Haitian Creole, the definite article has five forms, and it is placed after the noun it modifies. The final syllable of the preceding word determines which form the definite article takes. If the last sound is an oral consonant or a glide (spelled 'y' or 'w'), and if it is preceded by an oral vowel, the definite article is la:

Haitian Creole	French	English	Note
kravat la	la cravate	the tie	
liv la	le livre	the book	
kay la	la maison	the house	From French "la cahut(t)e" (English "hut, shack")
kaw la	le corbeau	the crow	

If the last sound is an oral consonant and is preceded by a nasal vowel, the definite article is lan:

Haitian Creole	French	English
lanp lan	la lampe	the lamp
bank lan	la banque	the bank

If the last sound is an oral vowel and is preceded by an oral consonant, the definite article is a:

Haitian Creole	French	English
kouto a	le couteau	the knife
peyi a	le pays	the country

If the last sound is any oral vowel other than i or ou and is preceded by a nasal consonant, then the definite article is also a:

Haitian Creole	French	English
lame a	l'armée	the army
anana a	l'ananas	the pineapple
dine a	le dîner	the dinner
nò a	le nord	the north

If a word ends in mi, mou, ni, nou, or if it ends with any nasal vowel, then the definite article is an:

Haitian Creole	French	English
fanmi an	la famille	the family
jenou an	le genou	the knee
chen an	le chien	the dog
pon an	le pont	the bridge

If the last sound is a nasal consonant, the definite article is nan, but may also be lan:

Haitian Creole	French	English	
machin nan	la voiture	the car	
machin lan	la voiture	the car	
telefonn nan	le téléphone	the telephone	The spelling "telefòn" is also attested.
telefonn lan	le téléphone	the telephone	The spelling "telefòn" is also attested.
fanm nan	la femme	the woman	
fanm lan	la femme	the woman	

=== Demonstratives ===
There is a single word sa that corresponds to English "this" and to "that" (and to French ce, ceci, cela, and ça). As in English, it may be used as a demonstrative, except that it is placed after the noun that it qualifies. It is often followed by a or yo (in order to mark number): sa a ("this here" or "that there"):

Haitian Creole	French	English
jaden sa bèl	ce jardin est beau	this garden is beautiful
jaden sa bèl	ce jardin est beau	that garden is beautiful

As in English, it may also be used as a pronoun, replacing a noun:

Haitian Creole	French	English
sa se zanmi mwen	c'est mon ami	this is my friend
sa se zanmi mwen	c'est mon ami	that is my friend
sa se chen frè mwen	c'est le chien de mon frère	this is my brother's dog
sa se chen frè mwen	c'est le chien de mon frère	that is my brother's dog

=== Verbs ===
Many verbs in Haitian Creole are the same spoken words as the French infinitive, but there is no conjugation in the language; the verbs have one form only, and changes in tense, mood, and aspect are indicated by the use of markers:

Haitian Creole	French	English
li ale travay nan maten	il va au travail le matin	he goes to work in the morning
li ale travay nan maten	elle va au travail le matin	she goes to work in the morning
li dòmi aswè	il dort le soir	he sleeps in the evening
li dòmi aswè	elle dort le soir	she sleeps in the evening
li li Bib la	il lit la Bible	he reads the Bible
li li Bib la	elle lit la Bible	she reads the Bible
mwen fè manje	je fais à manger	I make food
mwen fè manje	je fais à manger	I cook
nou toujou etidye	nous étudions toujours	we always study

==== Copula ====
The concept expressed in English by the verb "to be" is expressed in Haitian Creole by three words, se, ye, and sometimes e.

The verb se (pronounced similarly to the English word "say") is used to link a subject with a predicate nominative:

Haitian Creole	French	English
li se frè mwen	c'est mon frère	he is my brother
mwen se yon doktè	je suis médecin	I'm a doctor
mwen se yon doktè	je suis docteur	I'm a doctor
sa se yon pyebwa mango	c'est un manguier	this is a mango tree
sa se yon pyebwa mango	c'est un manguier	that is a mango tree
nou se zanmi	nous sommes amis	we are friends

The subject of a sentence with se might not be included. In which case, the sentence is interpreted as if the subject were sa ("this" or "that") or li ("he", "she" or "it"):

Haitian Creole	French	English
se yon bon ide	c'est une bonne idée	that's a good idea
se yon bon ide	c'est une bonne idée	this is a good idea
se nouvo chemiz mwen	c'est ma nouvelle chemise	that's my new shirt
se nouvo chemiz mwen	c'est ma nouvelle chemise	this is my new shirt

To express "I want to be", usually vin ("to become") is used instead of se.

Haitian Creole	French	English	
li pral vin bofrè m	il va devenir mon beau-frère	he will be my brother-in-law	he will be my stepbrother
li pral vin bofrè mwen	il va devenir mon beau-frère	he will be my brother-in-law	he will be my stepbrother
mwen vle vin yon doktè	je veux devenir docteur	I want to become a doctor	
sa pral vin yon pye mango	ça va devenir un manguier	that will become a mango tree	
sa pral vin yon pye mango	ça va devenir un manguier	this will become a mango tree	
nou pral vin zanmi	nous allons devenir amis	we will be friends	

Ye also means "to be", but is placed exclusively at the end of a sentence, after the predicate and the subject (in that order):

Haitian Creole	French	English
mwen se Ayisyen	je suis haïtien	I am Haitian
Ayisyen mwen ye	je suis haïtien	I am Haitian
Kòman ou ye?	lit. Comment + vous + êtes ("Comment êtes-vous?")	How are you?

Haitian Creole has stative verbs, which means that the verb "to be" is not covert when followed by an adjective. Therefore, malad means both "sick" and "to be sick":

Haitian Creole	French	English
mwen gen yon sè ki malad	j'ai une sœur malade	I have a sick sister
sè mwen malad	ma sœur est malade	my sister is sick

==== To have ====
The verb "to have" is genyen, often shortened to gen.

Haitian Creole	French	English
mwen gen lajan nan bank lan	j'ai de l'argent dans la banque	I have money in the bank

==== There is ====
The verb genyen (or gen) also means "there is" or "there are":

Haitian Creole	French	English
gen anpil Ayisyen nan Florid	il y a beaucoup d'Haïtiens en Floride	there are many Haitians in Florida
gen on moun la	il y a quelqu'un là	there is someone here
gen on moun la	il y a quelqu'un là	there is someone there
pa gen moun la	il n'y a personne là	there is nobody here
pa gen moun la	il n'y a personne là	there is nobody there

==== To know ====
The Haitian Creole word for "to know" and "to know how" is konnen, which is often shortened to konn.

Haitian Creole	French	English
Èske ou konnen non li?	Est-ce que tu connais son nom?	Do you know his name?
Èske ou konnen non li?	Est-ce que tu connais son nom?	Do you know her name?
mwen konnen kote li ye	je sais où il est	I know where he is
mwen konnen kote li ye	je sais où elle est	I know where she is
Mwen konn fè manje	Je sais comment faire à manger	I know how to cook (lit. "I know how to make food")
Èske ou konn ale Ayiti?	Est-ce que tu as été en Haïti?	Have you been to Haiti? (lit. "Do you know to go to Haiti?")
Li pa konn li franse	Il ne sait pas lire le français	He cannot read French (lit. "He doesn't know how to read French")
Li pa konn li franse	Elle ne sait pas lire le français	She cannot read French (lit. "She doesn't know how to read French")

==== To do ====
Fè means "do" or "make". It has a broad range of meanings, as it is one of the most common verbs used in idiomatic phrases.

Haitian Creole	French	English
Kòman ou fè pale kreyòl?	Comment as-tu appris à parler Créole?	How did you learn to speak Haitian Creole?
Marie konn fè mayi moulen.	Marie sait faire de la farine de maïs.	Marie knows how to make cornmeal.

==== To be able to ====
The verb kapab (or shortened to ka, kap or kab) means "to be able to (do something)". It refers to both "capability" and "availability":

Haitian Creole	French	English
mwen ka ale demen	je peux aller demain	I can go tomorrow
petèt mwen ka fè sa demen	je peux peut-être faire ça demain	maybe I can do that tomorrow
nou ka ale pita	nous pouvons aller plus tard	we can go later

==== Tense markers ====
There is no conjugation in Haitian Creole. In the present non-progressive tense, one just uses the basic verb form for stative verbs:

Haitian Creole	French	English
mwen pale kreyòl	je parle créole	I speak Creole

When the basic form of action verbs is used without any verb markers, it is generally understood as referring to the past:

Haitian Creole	French	English
mwen manje	j'ai mangé	I ate
ou manje	tu as mangé	you ate
li manje	il a mangé	he ate
li manje	elle a mangé	she ate
nou manje	nous avons mangé	we ate
yo manje	ils ont mangé	they ate
yo manje	elles ont mangé	they ate

Manje means both "food" and "to eat", as manger does in Canadian French; m ap manje bon manje means "I am eating good food".

For other tenses, special "tense marker" words are placed before the verb. The basic ones are:

Tense marker	Tense	Annotations
te	simple past	from French été ("been")
t ap	past progressive	a combination of te and ap, "was doing"
ap	present progressive	with ap and a, the pronouns nearly always take the short form (m ap, l ap, n ap, y ap, etc.). From 18th-century French être après, progressive form
a	future	some limitations on use. From French avoir à ("to have to")
pral	near or definite future	translates to "going to". Contraction of French pour aller ("going to")
ta	conditional future	a combination of te and a ("will do")

Simple past or past perfect:

Haitian Creole	English
mwen te manje	I ate
mwen te manje	I had eaten
ou te manje	you ate
ou te manje	you had eaten
li te manje	he ate
li te manje	she ate
li te manje	he had eaten
li te manje	she had eaten
nou te manje	we ate
nou te manje	we had eaten
yo te manje	they ate
yo te manje	they had eaten

Past progressive:

Haitian Creole	English
mwen t ap manje	I was eating
ou t ap manje	you were eating
li t ap manje	he was eating
li t ap manje	she was eating
nou t ap manje	we were eating
yo t ap manje	they were eating

Present progressive:

Haitian Creole	English
m ap manje	I am eating
w ap manje	you are eating
l ap manje	he is eating
l ap manje	she is eating
n ap manje	we are eating
y ap manje	they are eating

For the present progressive, it is customary, though not necessary, to add kounye a ("right now"):

Haitian Creole	English
m ap manje kounye a	I am eating right now
y ap manje kounye a	they are eating right now

Also, ap manje can mean "will eat" depending on the context of the sentence:

Haitian Creole	English
m ap manje apre m priye	I will eat after I pray
m ap manje apre m priye	I am eating after I pray
mwen p ap di sa	I will not say that
mwen p ap di sa	I am not saying that

Near or definite future:

Haitian Creole	English
mwen pral manje	I am going to eat
ou pral manje	you are going to eat
li pral manje	he is going to eat
li pral manje	she is going to eat
nou pral manje	we are going to eat
yo pral manje	they are going to eat

Future:

Haitian Creole	English
n a wè pita	see you later (lit. "we will see later")

Other examples:

Haitian Creole	English
mwen te wè zanmi ou yè	I saw your friend yesterday
nou te pale lontan	we spoke for a long time
lè l te gen uit an...	when he was eight years old...
lè l te gen uit an...	when she was eight years old...
m a travay	I will work
m pral travay	I'm going to work
n a li l demen	we'll read it tomorrow
nou pral li l demen	we are going to read it tomorrow
mwen t ap mache epi m te wè yon chen	I was walking and I saw a dog

Recent past markers include fèk and sòt (both mean "just" or "just now" and are often used together):

Haitian Creole	English
mwen fèk sòt antre kay la	I just entered the house

A verb mood marker is ta, corresponding to English "would" and equivalent to the French conditional tense:

Haitian Creole	English
yo ta renmen jwe	they would like to play
mwen ta vini si m te gen yon machin	I would come if I had a car
li ta bliye w si ou pa t la	he would forget you if you weren't here
li ta bliye w si ou pa t la	she would forget you if you weren't here

==== Negation ====
The word pa comes before a verb and any tense markers to negate it:

Haitian Creole	English
Rose pa vle ale	Rose doesn't want to go
Rose pa t vle ale	Rose didn't want to go

== Lexicon ==
Most of the lexicon of Creole is derived from French, with significant changes in pronunciation and morphology; often the French definite article was retained as part of the noun. For example, the French definite article la in la lune ("the moon") was incorporated into the Creole noun for moon: lalin. However, the language also inherited many words of different origins, among them Wolof, Fon, Kongo, English, Spanish, Portuguese, Taino and Arabic.

Haitian Creole creates and borrows new words to describe new or old concepts and realities. Examples of this are fè bak which was borrowed from English and means "to move backwards" (the original word derived from French is rekile from reculer), and also from English, napkin, which is being used as well as tòchon, from the French torchon.

=== Sample ===
Haitian Creole	IPA	Origin	English
ablado	/ablado/	Spanish: hablador	"a talker"
anasi	/anasi/	Akan: ananse	spider
annanna	/ãnãna/	Taino: ananas; also used in French	pineapple
Ayiti	/ajiti/	Taino: Ahatti, lit. 'mountainous land'	Haiti ("mountainous land")
bagay	/baɡaj/	French: bagage, lit. 'baggage'	thing
bannann	/bãnãn/	French: banane, lit. 'banana'	banana/plantain
bekàn	/bekan/	French: bécane	bicycle
bokit	/bokit/	bucket	
bòkò	/bɔkɔ/	Fon: bokono	sorcerer
Bondye	/bõdje/	French: bon dieu, lit. 'good God'	God
chenèt	/ʃenɛt/	French: quénette (French Antilles)	gap between the two front teeth
chouk	/ʃuk/	Fula: chuk, lit. 'to pierce, to poke'	poke
dekabès	/dekabes/	Spanish: dos cabezas, lit. 'two heads'	two-headed win during dominos
dèyè	/dɛjɛ/	French: derrière	behind
diri	/diɣi/	French: du riz, lit. 'some rice'	rice
èkondisyone	/ɛkondisjone/	air conditioner	air conditioner
Etazini	/etazini/	French: États-Unis	United States
fig	/fiɡ/	French: figue, lit. 'fig'	banana
je	/ʒe/	French: les yeux, lit. 'the eyes'	eye
kannistè	/kannistɛ/	canister	tin can
kay	/kaj/	French: la cahutte, lit. 'the hut'	house
kle	/kle/	French: clé, lit. 'key'	key, wrench
kle kola	/kle kola/	French: clé, lit. 'key'	bottle opener
kle kola	/kle kola/	cola	bottle opener
kònfleks	/kɔnfleks/	corn flakes	breakfast cereal
kawotchou	/kawotʃu/	French: caoutchouc, lit. 'rubber'	tire
lalin	/lalin/	French: la lune, lit. 'the moon'	moon
li	/li/	French: lui	he, she, him, her, it
makak	/makak/	French: macaque	monkey
manbo	/mãbo/	Kongo: mambu or Fon: nanbo	vodou priestess
marasa	/maɣasa/	Kongo: mapassa	twins
matant	/matãt/	French: ma tante, lit. 'my aunt'	aunt, aged woman
moun	/mun/	French: monde, lit. 'world'	people, person
mwen	/mwɛ̃/	French: moi, lit. 'me'	I, me, my, myself
nimewo	/nimewo/	French: numéro, lit. 'number'	number
oungan	/ũɡã/	Fon: houngan	vodou priest
piman	/pimã/	French: piment	a very hot pepper
pann	/pãn/	French: pendre, lit. 'to hang'	clothesline
podyab	/podjab/	French: pauvre diable or Spanish: pobre diablo	poor devil
pwa	/pwa/	French: pois, lit. 'pea'	bean
sapat	/sapat/	Spanish: zapato; French: savatte	sandal
seyfing	/sejfiŋ/	surfing	sea-surfing
tonton	/tõtõ/	French: tonton	uncle, aged man
vwazen	/vwazɛ̃/	French: voisin	neighbor
zonbi	/zõbi/	Kongo: nzumbi	soulless corpse, living dead, ghost, zombie
zwazo	/zwazo/	French: les oiseaux, lit. 'the birds'	bird

=== Nèg and blan ===
Although nèg and blan have similar words in French (nègre, a pejorative to refer to black people, and blanc, meaning white, or white person), the meanings they carry in French do not apply in Haitian Creole. Nèg means "a person" or "a man" (like "guy" or "dude" in American English). The word blan generally means "foreigner" or "not from Haiti". Thus, a non-black Haitian man (usually biracial) could be called nèg, while a black person from the US could be referred to as blan.

Etymologically, the word nèg is derived from the French nègre and is cognate with the Spanish negro ("black", both the color black and the people).

There are many other Haitian Creole terms for specific tones of skin including grimo, bren, roz, and mawon. Some Haitians consider such labels offensive because of their association with color discrimination and the Haitian class system, while others use the terms freely.

== Examples ==
Haitian Creole	English
Papa Nou ki nan sièl, ké non ou jouinn tout réspè, ké règn ou vini, ké volonté ou akonpli, sou té a tankou nan sièl. Ban nou jod a pin chak jou nou, padonnin nou péché nou, tankou nou padonnin moun ki ofansé nou. Pa minnin nou nan tentasion, min délivré nou an-ba malin an. Amen.	Our Father, who art in heaven, hallowed be thy name, thy kingdom come, thy will be done, on earth as it is in heaven. Give us this day, our daily bread, and forgive us our trespasses, as we forgive those who trespass against us. And lead us not into temptation, but deliver us from evil. Amen.

=== Salutations ===
Haitian Creole	English
A demen!	See you tomorrow!
A pi ta!	See you later!
Adye!	Goodbye! (permanently)
Anchante!	Nice to meet you! (lit. "enchanted!")
Bon apre-midi!	Good afternoon!
Bòn chans!	Good luck!
Bòn nui!	Good night!
Bonjou!	Good day!
Bonjou!	Good morning!
Bonswa!	Good evening
Dezole!	Sorry!
Eskize m!	Excuse me!
Kenbe la!	Hang in there! (informal)
Ki jan ou rele?	What's your name?
Ki non ou?	What's your name?
Ki non w?	What's your name?
Kòman ou rele?	What's your name?
Mwen rele...	My name is...
Non m se...	My name is...
Ki jan ou ye?	How are you?
Ki laj ou?	How old are you? (lit. "What is your age?")
Ki laj ou genyen?	How old are you? (lit. "What is your age?")
Kòman ou ye?	How are you?
Kon si, kon sa	So-so
Kontinye konsa!	Keep it up!
M ap boule	I'm managing (informal; lit. "I'm burning") (common response to sa kap fèt and sak pase)
M ap kenbe	I'm hanging on (informal)
M ap viv	I'm living
Mal	Bad
Men wi	Of course
Mèsi	Thank you
Mèsi anpil	Many thanks
Mwen byen	I'm well
Mwen dakò	I agree
Mwen gen ... an	I'm ... years old
Mwen la	I'm so-so (informal; lit. "I'm here")
N a wè pita!	See you later! (lit. "We will see later!")
Orevwa!	Goodbye! (temporarily)
Pa mal	Not bad
Pa pi mal	Not so bad
Padon!	Pardon!
Padon!	Sorry!
Padon!	Move!
Padone m!	Pardon me!
Padone m!	Forgive me!
Pòte w byen!	Take care! (lit. "Carry yourself well!")
Sa k ap fèt?	What's going on? (informal)
Sa k ap fèt?	What's up? (informal)
Sa k pase?	What's happening? (informal)
Sa k pase?	What's up? (informal)
Tout al byen	All is well (lit. "All goes well")
Tout bagay anfòm	Everything is fine (lit. "Everything is in form")
Tout pa bon	All is not well (lit. "All is not good")

== Proverbs and expressions ==
Proverbs play a central role in traditional Haitian culture and Haitian Creole speakers make frequent use of them as well as of other metaphors.

=== Proverbs ===
Haitian Creole	English
Men anpil, chay pa lou	Strength through unity (lit. "With many hands, the burden is not heavy"; Haitian Creole equivalent of the French on the coat of arms of Haiti, which reads l'union fait la force)
Apre bal, tanbou lou	There are consequences to your actions (lit. "After the dance, the drum is heavy")
Sak vid pa kanpe	No work gets done on an empty stomach (lit. "An empty bag does not stand up")
Pitit tig se tig	Like father like son (lit. "The son of a tiger is a tiger")
Ak pasyans w ap wè tete pis	Anything is possible (lit. "With patience you will see the breast of the ant")
Bay kou bliye, pote mak sonje	The giver of the blow forgets, the carrier of the scar remembers
Mache chèche pa janm dòmi san soupe	You will get what you deserve
Bèl dan pa di zanmi	Not all smiles are friendly (lit. "Good teeth don't mean (that person is) a friend")
Bèl antèman pa di paradi	A beautiful funeral does not guarantee heaven
Bèl fanm pa di bon mennaj	A beautiful wife does not guarantee a happy marriage
Dan konn mòde lang	People who work together sometimes hurt each other (lit. "Teeth are known to bite the tongue")
Sa k rive koukouloulou a ka rive kakalanga tou	What happens to the dumb guy can happen to the smart one too (lit. "What happens to the turkey can happen to the rooster too")
Chak jou pa Dimanch	Your luck will not last forever (lit. "Not every day is Sunday")
Fanm pou yon tan, manman pou tout tan	A woman is for a time, a mother is for all time
Nèg di san fè, Bondye fè san di	Man talks without doing, God does without talking
Sa Bondye sere pou ou, lavalas pa ka pote l ale	What God has saved for you, nobody can take it away
Nèg rich se milat, milat pòv se nèg	A rich negro is a mulatto, a poor mulatto is a negro
Pale franse pa di lespri	Speaking French does not mean you are smart
Wòch nan dlo pa konnen doulè wòch nan solèy	The rock in the water does not know the pain of the rock in the sun
Ravèt pa janm gen rezon devan poul	Justice will always be on the side of the stronger (lit. "A cockroach in front of a chicken is never correct")
Si ou bwè dlo nan vè, respèkte vè a	If you drink water from a glass, respect the glass
Si travay te bon bagay, moun rich ta pran l lontan	If work were a good thing, the rich would have grabbed it a long time ago
Sèl pa vante tèt li di li sale	Let others praise you (lit. "Salt doesn't brag that it's salty," said to those who praise themselves)
Bouch granmoun santi, sak ladan l se rezon	Wisdom comes from the mouth of old people (lit. "The mouth of the old stinks but what's inside is wisdom")
Tout moun se moun	Everyone matters (lit. "Everybody is a person")

=== Expressions ===
Haitian Creole	English
Se lave men, siye l atè	It was useless work (lit. "Wash your hands and wipe them on the floor")
M ap di ou sa kasayòl te di bèf la	Mind your own business
Li pale franse	He cannot be trusted, he is full of himself (lit. "He speaks French")
Kreyòl pale, kreyòl konprann	Speak straightforwardly and honestly (lit. "Creole talks, Creole understands")
Bouche nen ou pou bwè dlo santi	You have to accept a bad situation (lit. "Pinch your nose to drink smelly water")
Mache sou pinga ou, pou ou pa pile: "Si m te konnen!"	"Be on your guard, so you don't have to say: 'If only I'd known!'"
Tann jis nou tounen pwa tann	To wait forever (lit. "left hanging until we became string beans" which is a word play on tann, which means both "to hang" and "to wait")
San pran souf	Without taking a breath; continuously
W ap konn jòj	Warning or threat of punishment or reprimand (lit. "You will know George")
Dis ti piti tankou ou	Dismissing or defying a threat or show of force (lit. "Ten little ones like you couldn't.")
Lè poul va fè dan	Never (lit. "When hens grow teeth")
Piti piti zwazo fè nich li	You will learn (lit. "Little by little the bird makes its nest")

== Usage abroad ==
=== United States and Canada ===
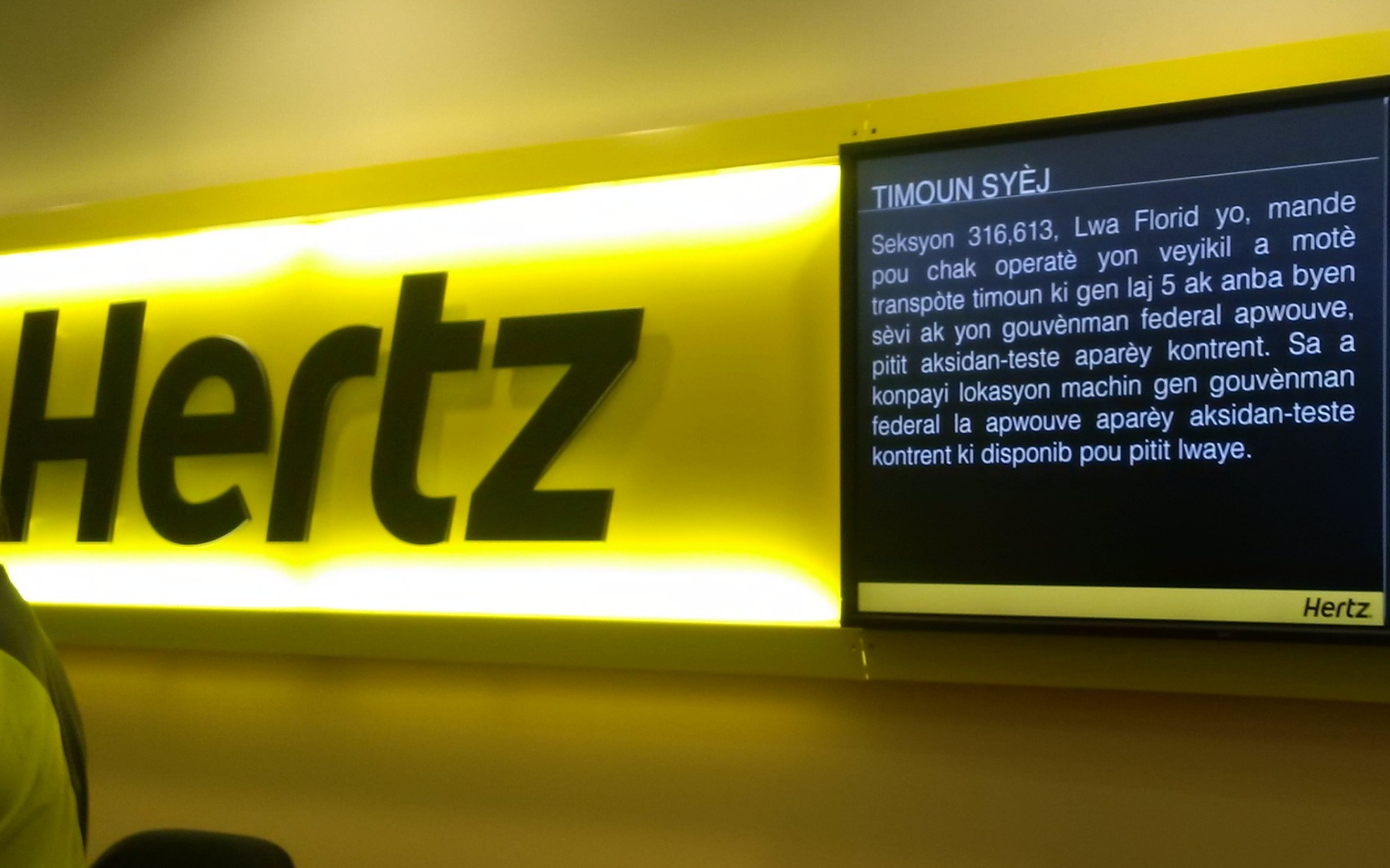
Haitian Creole display at a car rental counter in the Northwest Florida Beaches International Airport (2014)

A CDC-sponsored poster about the COVID-19 prevention in Haitian Creole

Haitian Creole is used widely among Haitians who have relocated to other countries, particularly the United States and Canada. Some of the larger Creole-speaking populations are found in Montreal, Quebec (where French is the official language), New York City, Boston, and Central and South Florida (Miami, Fort Lauderdale, and Palm Beach). To reach out to the large Haitian population, government agencies have produced various public service announcements, school-parent communications, and other materials in Haitian Creole. For instance, Miami-Dade County in Florida sends out paper communications in Haitian Creole in addition to English and Spanish. In the Boston area, the Boston subway system and area hospitals and medical offices post announcements in Haitian Creole as well as English. North America's only Creole-language television network is HBN, based in Miami. These areas also each have more than half a dozen Creole-language AM radio stations.

Haitian Creole and Haitian culture are taught in many colleges in the United States and the Bahamas. York College, City University of New York, features a minor in Haitian Creole. Indiana University's Albert Valdman founded the country's first Creole Institute where Haitian Creole, among other facets of Haiti, were studied and researched. The University of Kansas, Lawrence has an Institute of Haitian studies, founded by Bryant Freeman. The University of Massachusetts Boston, Florida International University, and Indiana University Bloomington offer seminars and courses annually at their Haitian Creole Summer Institutes. Brown University, University of Miami, Tulane University, and Duke University also offer Haitian Creole classes, and Columbia University and NYU have jointly offered a course since 2015. The University of Chicago began offering Creole courses in 2010.

As of 2015, the New York City Department of Education counted 2,838 Haitian Creole-speaking English-language learners (ELLs) in the city's K–12 schools, making it the seventh most common home language of ELLs citywide and the fifth most common home language of Brooklyn ELLs. Because of the large population of Haitian Creole-speaking students within NYC schools, various organizations have been established to respond to the needs of these students. For example, Flanbwayan and Gran Chimen Sant Kiltirèl, both located in Brooklyn, New York, aim to promote education and Haitian culture through advocacy, literacy projects, and cultural/artistic endeavors.

=== Cuba ===
Haitian Creole is the second most spoken language in Cuba after Spanish, where over 300,000 Haitian immigrants speak it. It is recognized as a minority language in Cuba and a considerable number of Cubans speak it fluently. Most of these speakers have never been to Haiti and do not possess Haitian ancestry, but merely learned it in their communities. In addition, there is a Haitian Creole radio station operating in Havana.

=== Dominican Republic ===
As of 2012, the language was also spoken by over 450,000 Haitians who reside in the neighboring Dominican Republic, although the locals do not speak it. However, some estimates suggest that there are over a million speakers due to a huge population of undocumented immigrants from Haiti.

=== The Bahamas ===
As of 2009, up to 80,000 Haitians were estimated residing in the Bahamas, where about 20,000 speak Haitian Creole. It is the third most‑spoken language after English and Bahamian Creole.

== Software ==
After the 2010 Haiti earthquake, international aid workers desperately needed translation tools for communicating in Haitian Creole. Furthermore, international organizations had little idea whom to contact as translators. As an emergency measure, Carnegie Mellon University released data for its own research into the public domain. Microsoft Research and Google Translate implemented alpha version machine translators based on the Carnegie Mellon data.

Several smartphone apps have been released, including learning with flashcards by Byki and two medical dictionaries, one by Educa Vision and a second by Ultralingua, the latter of which includes an audio phrase book and a section on cultural anthropology.

== See also ==
- Afro-Brazilians
- Akademi Kreyòl Ayisyen
- Antillean Creole French
- Creole language
- Louisiana Creole French
- Michel DeGraff
- Radio Haiti-Inter
