= Paudge Brennan =

Irish politician (1922–1998)

Parliamentary Secretary
- 1965–1970: Local Government

Teachta Dála
- In office November 1982 – January 1987
- In office June 1981 – February 1982
- In office May 1954 – February 1973
- Constituency: Wicklow

Senator
- In office 13 May 1982 – 24 November 1982
- Constituency: Nominated by the Taoiseach

Personal details
- Born: 18 February 1922 County Wicklow, Ireland
- Died: 10 June 1998 (aged 76) County Wicklow, Ireland
- Party: Fianna Fáil
- Other political affiliations: Clann na Poblachta; Aontacht Éireann; Independent
- Spouse: Mary Smith (m. 1950)
- Children: 6
- Parent: Thomas Brennan (father)

Patrick Brennan (18 February 1922 – 10 June 1998) was an Irish Fianna Fáil politician who sat for 25 years as a Teachta Dála (TD) for the Wicklow constituency, and was briefly a senator.

== Early life ==
Patrick Brennan was born on 18 February 1922 in Carnew, County Wicklow, the fourth among nine children of Thomas Brennan, a builder and politician, and Sarah Brennan (née Quinn). During the Irish War of Independence his father had been Commandant, 4th Battalion of the North Wexford Brigade of the Irish Republican Army, and later served as Fianna Fáil TD for Wicklow from 1944 to 1953. He was educated locally at Carnew national school and Carnew vocational school, and joined his father's building firm.

== Politics ==
Brennan first stood for election to Dáil Éireann as a Clann na Poblachta candidate in Kildare at the 1948 Irish general election. He fared poorly, coming second last with 3.0% of the vote, compared to 10.7% secured by his Clann na Poblachta running mate Daniel Boland. He was a member of Wicklow County Council from 1953 to 1965.

He ran next as a Fianna Fáil candidate in Wicklow at the 1953 by-election caused by the death of his father Thomas Brennan. The by-election was won by Fine Gael's Mark Deering. Brennan was elected at the following 1954 general election, and was re-elected at the next four general elections. He topped the poll on each occasion, and by virtue of one of the largest votes at the 1957 general election, he managed to secure two seats for Fianna Fáil in the constituency, where he was joined by his running mate James O'Toole.

On 21 April 1965 he was appointed as Parliamentary Secretary to the Minister for Local Government by the government of Seán Lemass. He was appointed to the same position on 16 November 1966 and on 9 July 1969 by the governments of Jack Lynch. He resigned on 8 May 1970, just two days after the resignation of the Minister for Local Government, Kevin Boland, and the sacking of Neil Blaney and Charles Haughey as ministers at the outbreak of the Arms Crisis.

Brennan abstained in a vote of confidence in Jim Gibbons on 10 November 1971 and was expelled from the Fianna Fáil parliamentary party on 17 November 1971. While closely aligned with Kevin Boland, Brennan joined Boland's new party, Aontacht Éireann. He contested the 1973 general election as an independent candidate, but he lost his seat to Fianna Fáil's Ciarán Murphy.

He subsequently rejoined Fianna Fáil, and at the 1981 general election was elected again as a TD for Wicklow. He lost his seat at the February 1982 election, and was nominated by the Taoiseach to the Seanad. He was re-elected to the Dáil at the November 1982 general election, ousting Ciarán Murphy. Brennan retired from politics at the 1987 general election.

== Personal life ==
He married Mary Smith in October 1950; and they had three sons and three daughters. They lived at Main Street, Carnew, County Wicklow.

Brennan died on 10 June 1998 in Wicklow, aged 76.

== See also ==
- Families in the Oireachtas

Political offices
New office	Parliamentary Secretary to the Minister for Local Government; 1965–1970	Succeeded by Liam Cunningham

Dáil	Election	Deputy (Party)	Deputy (Party)	Deputy (Party)	Deputy (Party)	Deputy (Party)
4th	1923	Christopher Byrne (CnaG)	James Everett (Lab)	Richard Wilson (FP)	3 seats 1923–1981	
5th	1927 (Jun)	Séamus Moore (FF)	James Everett (Lab)	Dermot O'Mahony (CnaG)	3 seats 1923–1981	
6th	1927 (Sep)	Séamus Moore (FF)	James Everett (Lab)	Dermot O'Mahony (CnaG)	3 seats 1923–1981	
7th	1932	Séamus Moore (FF)	James Everett (Lab)	Dermot O'Mahony (CnaG)	3 seats 1923–1981	
8th	1933	Séamus Moore (FF)	James Everett (Lab)	Dermot O'Mahony (CnaG)	3 seats 1923–1981	
9th	1937	Séamus Moore (FF)	James Everett (Lab)	Dermot O'Mahony (FG)	3 seats 1923–1981	
10th	1938	Séamus Moore (FF)	James Everett (Lab)	Patrick Cogan (Ind.)	3 seats 1923–1981	
11th	1943	Christopher Byrne (FF)	James Everett (Lab)	Patrick Cogan (CnaT)	3 seats 1923–1981	
12th	1944	Thomas Brennan (FF)	James Everett (NLP)	Patrick Cogan (CnaT)	3 seats 1923–1981	
13th	1948	Thomas Brennan (FF)	James Everett (NLP)	Patrick Cogan (Ind.)	3 seats 1923–1981	
14th	1951	Thomas Brennan (FF)	James Everett (Lab)	Patrick Cogan (Ind.)	3 seats 1923–1981	
14th	1953 by-election	Mark Deering (FG)	James Everett (Lab)	Patrick Cogan (Ind.)	3 seats 1923–1981	
15th	1954	Mark Deering (FG)	James Everett (Lab)	Paudge Brennan (FF)	3 seats 1923–1981	
16th	1957	James O'Toole (FF)	James Everett (Lab)	Paudge Brennan (FF)	3 seats 1923–1981	
17th	1961	Michael O'Higgins (FG)	James Everett (Lab)	Paudge Brennan (FF)	3 seats 1923–1981	
18th	1965	Michael O'Higgins (FG)	James Everett (Lab)	Paudge Brennan (FF)	3 seats 1923–1981	
18th	1968 by-election	Michael O'Higgins (FG)	Godfrey Timmins (FG)	Paudge Brennan (FF)	3 seats 1923–1981	
19th	1969	Liam Kavanagh (Lab)	Godfrey Timmins (FG)	Paudge Brennan (FF)	3 seats 1923–1981	
20th	1973	Liam Kavanagh (Lab)	Godfrey Timmins (FG)	Ciarán Murphy (FF)	3 seats 1923–1981	
21st	1977	Liam Kavanagh (Lab)	Godfrey Timmins (FG)	Ciarán Murphy (FF)	3 seats 1923–1981	
22nd	1981	Liam Kavanagh (Lab)	Godfrey Timmins (FG)	Ciarán Murphy (FF)	Paudge Brennan (FF)	4 seats 1981–1992
23rd	1982 (Feb)	Liam Kavanagh (Lab)	Godfrey Timmins (FG)	Ciarán Murphy (FF)	Gemma Hussey (FG)	4 seats 1981–1992
24th	1982 (Nov)	Liam Kavanagh (Lab)	Godfrey Timmins (FG)	Paudge Brennan (FF)	Gemma Hussey (FG)	4 seats 1981–1992
25th	1987	Liam Kavanagh (Lab)	Joe Jacob (FF)	Dick Roche (FF)	Gemma Hussey (FG)	4 seats 1981–1992
26th	1989	Liam Kavanagh (Lab)	Joe Jacob (FF)	Dick Roche (FF)	Godfrey Timmins (FG)	4 seats 1981–1992
27th	1992	Liam Kavanagh (Lab)	Joe Jacob (FF)	Liz McManus (DL)	Godfrey Timmins (FG)	Johnny Fox (Ind.)
27th	1995 by-election	Liam Kavanagh (Lab)	Joe Jacob (FF)	Liz McManus (DL)	Godfrey Timmins (FG)	Mildred Fox (Ind.)
28th	1997	Dick Roche (FF)	Joe Jacob (FF)	Liz McManus (DL)	Billy Timmins (FG)	Mildred Fox (Ind.)
29th	2002	Dick Roche (FF)	Joe Jacob (FF)	Liz McManus (Lab)	Billy Timmins (FG)	Mildred Fox (Ind.)
30th	2007	Dick Roche (FF)	Joe Behan (FF)	Liz McManus (Lab)	Billy Timmins (FG)	Andrew Doyle (FG)
31st	2011	Simon Harris (FG)	Stephen Donnelly (Ind.)	Anne Ferris (Lab)	Billy Timmins (FG)	Andrew Doyle (FG)
32nd	2016	Simon Harris (FG)	Stephen Donnelly (SD)	John Brady (SF)	Pat Casey (FF)	Andrew Doyle (FG)
33rd	2020	Simon Harris (FG)	Stephen Donnelly (FF)	John Brady (SF)	Jennifer Whitmore (SD)	Steven Matthews (GP)
34th	2024	Simon Harris (FG)	Edward Timmins (FG)	John Brady (SF)	Jennifer Whitmore (SD)	4 seats since 2024
