= Kildare–Wicklow =

Dáil constituency (1921–1923)

- Former Dáil constituency
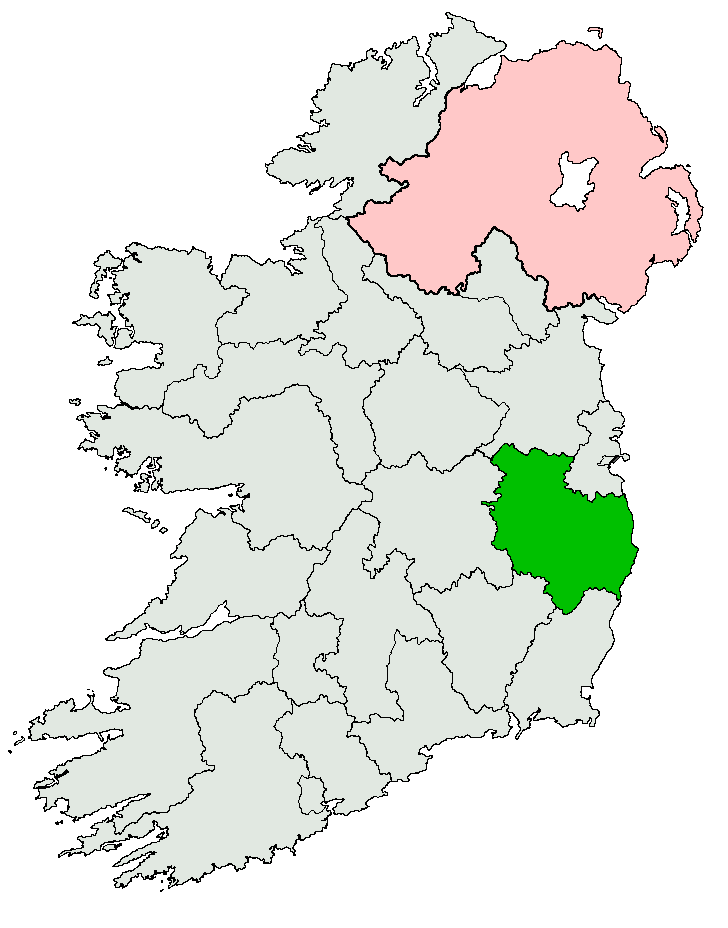
- Location of Kildare–Wicklow within Ireland

Former constituency
- Created: 1921
- Abolished: 1923
- Seats: 5
- Local government areas: County Kildare; County Wicklow
- Created from: North Kildare; South Kildare; East Wicklow; West Wicklow
- Replaced by: Kildare; Wicklow

Kildare–Wicklow was a parliamentary constituency represented in Dáil Éireann, the lower house of the Irish parliament or Oireachtas from 1921 to 1923. The constituency elected 5 deputies (Teachtaí Dála, commonly known as TDs) to the Dáil, on the system of proportional representation by means of the single transferable vote (PR-STV).

== History and boundaries ==
The constituency was created under the Government of Ireland Act 1920 to elect members to the House of Commons of Southern Ireland and first used at the 1921 general election to return the members of the 2nd Dáil. It covered all of County Kildare and County Wicklow.

Kildare–Wicklow was used again for the 1922 general election to the 3rd Dáil. Under the Electoral Act 1923, it was replaced by the two new single county constituencies of Kildare and Wicklow.

== TDs ==
Teachtaí Dála (TDs) for Kildare–Wicklow 1921–1923
Key to parties: FP = Farmers' Party; Lab = Labour; SF = Sinn Féin; AT-SF = Sinn Féin (Anti-Treaty); PT-SF = Sinn Féin (Pro-Treaty)
Dáil	Election	Deputy (Party)	Deputy (Party)	Deputy (Party)	Deputy (Party)	Deputy (Party)
2nd	1921	Erskine Childers (SF)	Domhnall Ua Buachalla (SF)	Robert Barton (SF)	Christopher Byrne (SF)	Art O'Connor (SF)
3rd	1922	Hugh Colohan (Lab)	James Everett (Lab)	Robert Barton (AT-SF)	Christopher Byrne (PT-SF)	Richard Wilson (FP)
4th	1923	Constituency abolished. See Kildare and Wicklow				

Note: The columns in this table are used only for presentational purposes, and no significance should be attached to the order of columns. For details of the order in which seats were won at each election, see the detailed results of that election.

== Elections ==
*: Outgoing TD

=== 1922 general election ===
1922 general election: Kildare–Wicklow
Party	Candidate	FPv%	Count								
Party	Candidate	FPv%	1	2	3	4	5	6	7	8	9
Sinn Féin (Pro-Treaty)	Christopher Byrne	26.6	9,170								
Labour	Hugh Colohan	18.9	6,522								
Labour	James Everett	17.4	5,993								
Farmers' Party	Richard Wilson	8.8	3,035	3,657	3,673	3,700	3,710	4,210	4,268	6,700	
Sinn Féin (Anti-Treaty)	Robert Barton	8.2	2,842	3,432	3,487	3,584	3,846	3,880	4,435	4,608	4,735
Farmers' Party	John Bergin	5.8	2,013	2,585	2,658	2,675	2,708	3,575	3,723		
Sinn Féin (Anti-Treaty)	Art O'Connor	5.1	1,776	2,397	2,705	2,758	2,903	2,964	3,917	4,215	4,360
Sinn Féin (Anti-Treaty)	Domhnall Ua Buachalla	4.2	1,438	1,822	2,032	2,052	2,121	2,207			
Farmers' Party	Patrick Phelan	3.5	1,213	1,678	1,755	1,765	1,785				
Sinn Féin (Anti-Treaty)	Erskine Childers	1.5	512	675	705	721					
Electorate: 58,584 Valid: 34,514 Quota: 5,753 Turnout: 58.9%

=== 1921 general election ===
1921 general election: Kildare–Wicklow (uncontested)
Party	Candidate
Sinn Féin	Robert Barton
Sinn Féin	Domhnall Ua Buachalla
Sinn Féin	Christopher Byrne
Sinn Féin	Erskine Childers
Sinn Féin	Art O'Connor

== See also ==
- Dáil constituencies
- Politics of the Republic of Ireland
- Historic Dáil constituencies
- Elections in the Republic of Ireland
