= Wicklow (Dáil constituency) =

Dáil constituency (1923–present)

- Dáil constituency
- Location of Wicklow within Ireland
- Interactive map of constituency boundaries since the 2024 general election
- Major settlements: Bray; Greystones; Wicklow

Current constituency
- Created: 1923
- Seats: 3 (1923–1981); 4 (1981–1992); 5 (1992–2024); 4 (2024–)
- TDs: John Brady (SF); Simon Harris (FG); Edward Timmins (FG); Jennifer Whitmore (SD)
- Local government area: County Wicklow
- Created from: Kildare–Wicklow
- EP constituency: South

Wicklow is a parliamentary constituency represented in Dáil Éireann, the lower house of the Irish parliament or Oireachtas. The constituency elects four deputies (Teachtaí Dála, commonly known as TDs) on the electoral system of proportional representation by means of the single transferable vote (PR-STV).

== Boundaries ==
From 2020 to 2024, the constituency spanned the entire area of County Wicklow, including the towns of Bray, Greystones, Arklow, Wicklow and Baltinglass. The Constituency Review Report 2023 of the Electoral Commission recommended that at the next general election, Wicklow lose a seat to become a four-seat constituency with the transfer of territory in the south of County Wicklow around the town of Arklow to the new constituency of Wicklow–Wexford.

For the 2024 general election, the Electoral (Amendment) Act 2023 defines the constituency as:

"The county of Wicklow except the part thereof which is comprised in the constituency of Wicklow-Wexford."

Changes to the Wicklow constituency
Years	TDs	Boundaries	Notes
1923–1937	3	County Wicklow.	Created from Kildare–Wicklow (5 seats).
1937–1948	3	County Wicklow; and in County Carlow, the district electoral divisions of Clonmore, Hacketstown, Haroldstown, Kineagh, Rahul, Rathvilly, Tiknock and Williamstown.	Transfer of DEDs in County Carlow from Carlow–Kilkenny
1948–1977	3	County Wicklow.	Transfer of DEDs in County Carlow to Carlow–Kilkenny; Increase in 1961 reflecting addition of Rathmichael (Bray) from County Dublin.
1977–1981	3	County Wicklow, except the parts in the constituencies of Dublin County Mid and Dublin County South.	Transfer of Blessington, Burgage Kilbride and Lackan, in the former Rural District of Baltinglass No. 1 to Dublin County Mid; Transfer of Bray No. 1 and Rathmichael (Bray) to Dublin County South.
1981–1992	4	County Wicklow.	Restoration to whole county.
1992–1997	5	County Wicklow; and in County Kildare, the district electoral divisions of Ballitore, Belan, Carrigeen, Castledermot, Graney, Inchaquire, Moone, Narraghmore, in the former Rural District of Athy No. 1; Ballymore Eustace, Carnalway, Gilitown, Kilcullen, Kilashee, Newtown, Usk, in the former Rural District of Naas No. 1.	Transfer of DEDs in County Kildare from Kildare.
1997–2020	5	County Wicklow; and in County Carlow, the electoral divisions of Clonmore, Hacketstown, Haroldstown, Kineagh, Rahill, Rathvilly, Ticknock, Williamstown, in the former Rural District of Baltinglass No. 2.	Transfer of EDs in County Kildare to Kildare South; transfer of EDs in County Carlow from Carlow–Kilkenny
2020–2024	5	County Wicklow	Transfer of EDs in County Carlow to Carlow–Kilkenny
2024–	4	County Wicklow, except the part in the constituency of Wicklow–Wexford	Transfer to Wicklow–Wexford of the electoral divisions of: Arklow Rural, Aughrim, Ballinaclash, Ballinacor, Ballinderry, Ballyarthur, Cronebane, Dunganstown East, Dunganstown South, Dunganstown West, Ennereilly, Kilbride, Ovoca, Rathdrum, in the former Rural District of Rathdrum; Aghowle, Ballingate, Ballinglen, Ballybeg, Carnew, Coolattin, Coolboy, Cronelea, Kilballyowen, Killinure, Kilpipe, Money, Rath, Shillelagh, Tinahely, in the former Rural District of Shillelagh; and Arklow No. 1 Urban, Arklow No. 2 Urban."

== TDs ==
Teachtaí Dála (TDs) for Wicklow 1923–
Key to parties: CnaT = Clann na Talmhan; CnaG = Cumann na nGaedheal; DL = Democratic Left; FP = Farmers' Party; FF = Fianna Fáil; FG = Fine Gael; GP = Green; Ind. = Independent; Lab = Labour; NLP = National Labour Party; SF = Sinn Féin; SD = Social Democrats
Dáil	Election	Deputy (Party)	Deputy (Party)	Deputy (Party)	Deputy (Party)	Deputy (Party)
4th	1923	Christopher Byrne (CnaG)	James Everett (Lab)	Richard Wilson (FP)	3 seats 1923–1981	
5th	1927 (Jun)	Séamus Moore (FF)	James Everett (Lab)	Dermot O'Mahony (CnaG)	3 seats 1923–1981	
6th	1927 (Sep)	Séamus Moore (FF)	James Everett (Lab)	Dermot O'Mahony (CnaG)	3 seats 1923–1981	
7th	1932	Séamus Moore (FF)	James Everett (Lab)	Dermot O'Mahony (CnaG)	3 seats 1923–1981	
8th	1933	Séamus Moore (FF)	James Everett (Lab)	Dermot O'Mahony (CnaG)	3 seats 1923–1981	
9th	1937	Séamus Moore (FF)	James Everett (Lab)	Dermot O'Mahony (FG)	3 seats 1923–1981	
10th	1938	Séamus Moore (FF)	James Everett (Lab)	Patrick Cogan (Ind.)	3 seats 1923–1981	
11th	1943	Christopher Byrne (FF)	James Everett (Lab)	Patrick Cogan (CnaT)	3 seats 1923–1981	
12th	1944	Thomas Brennan (FF)	James Everett (NLP)	Patrick Cogan (CnaT)	3 seats 1923–1981	
13th	1948	Thomas Brennan (FF)	James Everett (NLP)	Patrick Cogan (Ind.)	3 seats 1923–1981	
14th	1951	Thomas Brennan (FF)	James Everett (Lab)	Patrick Cogan (Ind.)	3 seats 1923–1981	
14th	1953 by-election	Mark Deering (FG)	James Everett (Lab)	Patrick Cogan (Ind.)	3 seats 1923–1981	
15th	1954	Mark Deering (FG)	James Everett (Lab)	Paudge Brennan (FF)	3 seats 1923–1981	
16th	1957	James O'Toole (FF)	James Everett (Lab)	Paudge Brennan (FF)	3 seats 1923–1981	
17th	1961	Michael O'Higgins (FG)	James Everett (Lab)	Paudge Brennan (FF)	3 seats 1923–1981	
18th	1965	Michael O'Higgins (FG)	James Everett (Lab)	Paudge Brennan (FF)	3 seats 1923–1981	
18th	1968 by-election	Michael O'Higgins (FG)	Godfrey Timmins (FG)	Paudge Brennan (FF)	3 seats 1923–1981	
19th	1969	Liam Kavanagh (Lab)	Godfrey Timmins (FG)	Paudge Brennan (FF)	3 seats 1923–1981	
20th	1973	Liam Kavanagh (Lab)	Godfrey Timmins (FG)	Ciarán Murphy (FF)	3 seats 1923–1981	
21st	1977	Liam Kavanagh (Lab)	Godfrey Timmins (FG)	Ciarán Murphy (FF)	3 seats 1923–1981	
22nd	1981	Liam Kavanagh (Lab)	Godfrey Timmins (FG)	Ciarán Murphy (FF)	Paudge Brennan (FF)	4 seats 1981–1992
23rd	1982 (Feb)	Liam Kavanagh (Lab)	Godfrey Timmins (FG)	Ciarán Murphy (FF)	Gemma Hussey (FG)	4 seats 1981–1992
24th	1982 (Nov)	Liam Kavanagh (Lab)	Godfrey Timmins (FG)	Paudge Brennan (FF)	Gemma Hussey (FG)	4 seats 1981–1992
25th	1987	Liam Kavanagh (Lab)	Joe Jacob (FF)	Dick Roche (FF)	Gemma Hussey (FG)	4 seats 1981–1992
26th	1989	Liam Kavanagh (Lab)	Joe Jacob (FF)	Dick Roche (FF)	Godfrey Timmins (FG)	4 seats 1981–1992
27th	1992	Liam Kavanagh (Lab)	Joe Jacob (FF)	Liz McManus (DL)	Godfrey Timmins (FG)	Johnny Fox (Ind.)
27th	1995 by-election	Liam Kavanagh (Lab)	Joe Jacob (FF)	Liz McManus (DL)	Godfrey Timmins (FG)	Mildred Fox (Ind.)
28th	1997	Dick Roche (FF)	Joe Jacob (FF)	Liz McManus (DL)	Billy Timmins (FG)	Mildred Fox (Ind.)
29th	2002	Dick Roche (FF)	Joe Jacob (FF)	Liz McManus (Lab)	Billy Timmins (FG)	Mildred Fox (Ind.)
30th	2007	Dick Roche (FF)	Joe Behan (FF)	Liz McManus (Lab)	Billy Timmins (FG)	Andrew Doyle (FG)
31st	2011	Simon Harris (FG)	Stephen Donnelly (Ind.)	Anne Ferris (Lab)	Billy Timmins (FG)	Andrew Doyle (FG)
32nd	2016	Simon Harris (FG)	Stephen Donnelly (SD)	John Brady (SF)	Pat Casey (FF)	Andrew Doyle (FG)
33rd	2020	Simon Harris (FG)	Stephen Donnelly (FF)	John Brady (SF)	Jennifer Whitmore (SD)	Steven Matthews (GP)
34th	2024	Simon Harris (FG)	Edward Timmins (FG)	John Brady (SF)	Jennifer Whitmore (SD)	4 seats since 2024

Note: The columns in this table are used only for presentational purposes, and no significance should be attached to the order of columns. For details of the order in which seats were won at each election, see the detailed results of that election.

== Elections ==
*: Outgoing TD

=== 2024 general election ===
2024 general election: Wicklow
Party	Candidate	FPv%	Count												
Party	Candidate	FPv%	1	2	3	4	5	6	7	8	9	10	11	12	13
Fine Gael	Simon Harris	29.6	16,869												
Sinn Féin	John Brady	14.8	8,450	8,601	8,654	8,950	9,143	9,523	9,851	10,289	10,491	10,640	11,945		
Social Democrats	Jennifer Whitmore	13.5	7,699	8,545	8,573	9,239	9,338	9,633	10,313	10,481	12,224				
Fianna Fáil	Stephen Donnelly	6.2	3,553	4,572	4,592	4,602	4,685	4,865	5,021	5,081	5,473	5,720	6,314	6,471	7,547
Independent	Shay Cullen	5.7	3,232	3,420	3,467	3,492	3,616	3,850	4,189	4,775	4,883	4,953	6,102	6,406	
Fine Gael	Edward Timmins	5.3	3,050	5,513	5,538	5,554	5,631	6,160	6,341	6,379	6,775	7,007	7,482	7,551	9,110
Independent	Joe Behan	5.1	2,909	3,138	3,210	3,235	3,596	3,678	3,778	4,447	4,570	4,681			
Green	Steven Matthews	4.1	2,366	2,627	2,645	2,733	2,771	2,810	3,094	3,142					
Labour	Paul O'Brien	3.5	2,009	2,150	2,160	2,243	2,270	2,296							
Independent	Gerry O'Neill	3.4	1,963	2,009	2,084	2,100	2,175								
Independent	Rob Carry	2.8	1,597	1,632	1,922	1,948	2,233	2,387	2,465						
Aontú	Ciarán Hogan	2.2	1,267	1,295	1,447	1,469									
PBP–Solidarity	Kellie McConnell (Note: McConnell is a member of People Before Profit.)	2.2	1,259	1,284	1,306										
Independent	Philip Dwyer	0.8	435	437											
The Irish People	Michaela Keddy	0.4	242	250											
Independent	Charlie Keddy	0.2	141	151											
Independent	Dominic Plant	0.1	21	23											
Independent	Sean O'Leary	0.1	9	9											
Electorate: 84,669 Valid: 57,071 Spoilt: 340 Quota: 11,415 Turnout: 67.8%

=== 2020 general election ===
2020 general election: Wicklow
Party	Candidate	FPv%	Count														
Party	Candidate	FPv%	1	2	3	4	5	6	7	8	9	10	11	12	13	14	15
Sinn Féin	John Brady	24.3	17,297														
Fine Gael	Simon Harris	12.3	8,765	8,885	8,890	8,913	8,929	8,948	8,968	9,129	9,171	9,369	9,545	9,774	11,261	11,752	11,838
Social Democrats	Jennifer Whitmore	9.9	7,039	7,951	7,966	7,996	8,035	8,095	8,208	8,635	9,422	9,987	11,148	11,405	11,875	13,405	
Green	Steven Matthews	7.9	5,634	6,064	6,079	6,095	6,114	6,159	6,299	6,629	7,072	7,410	7,713	7,838	8,114	9,108	9,622
Fianna Fáil	Stephen Donnelly	7.7	5,467	5,630	5,637	5,650	5,666	5,707	5,781	5,879	5,915	6,113	6,301	9,363	10,024	10,882	11,018
Fine Gael	Andrew Doyle	6.9	4,940	5,044	5,053	5,060	5,075	5,147	5,185	5,334	5,358	5,573	5,943	6,503	8,347	8,788	8,860
Fine Gael	Billy Timmins	6.6	4,679	4,796	4,798	4,803	4,812	4,935	5,051	5,138	5,160	5,283	5,429	5,813			
Fianna Fáil	Pat Casey	6.3	4,473	4,669	4,674	4,680	4,689	4,776	4,848	4,910	4,936	5,089	5,323				
Independent	John Snell	4.3	3,050	3,597	3,601	3,642	3,663	3,782	3,890	4,187	4,352	4,654					
Independent	Joe Behan	4.2	2,988	3,665	3,673	3,683	3,715	3,805	4,125	4,222	4,560	4,900	5,690	5,941	6,187		
Independent	Valerie Cox	2.5	1,805	2,107	2,115	2,128	2,144	2,235	2,370	2,480	2,724						
Labour	Paul O'Brien	2.4	1,727	1,912	1,915	1,927	1,936	1,956	1,975								
Aontú	Seamus Connor	1.5	1,051	1,208	1,211	1,217	1,239	1,351									
Solidarity–PBP	Sharon Briggs (Note: Briggs was a member of People Before Profit.)	1.5	1,037	2,244	2,255	2,262	2,278	2,335	2,403	2,448							
Independent	Tom Dunne	0.7	478	602	605	612	629										
National Party	Eileen Gunning	0.6	399	439	440	440	457										
Independent	Charlie Keddy	0.3	219	289	296	310											
Independent	John Larkin	0.2	173	212	219												
Independent	Anthony FitzGerald	0.1	79	93													
Independent	William King	0.0	20	26													
Electorate: 101,332 Valid: 71,320 Spoilt: 559 Quota: 11,887 Turnout: 71,879 (70.9%)

=== 2016 general election ===
2016 general election: Wicklow
Party	Candidate	FPv%	Count									
Party	Candidate	FPv%	1	2	3	4	5	6	7	8	9	10
Social Democrats	Stephen Donnelly	20.9	14,348									
Sinn Féin	John Brady	16.2	11,151	11,489								
Fine Gael	Simon Harris	15.7	10,819	11,468								
Fianna Fáil	Pat Casey	9.1	6,289	6,446	6,457	6,505	6,552	6,600	6,700	8,931	9,214	10,260
Fine Gael	Andrew Doyle	8.8	6,045	6,227	6,244	6,285	6,424	6,466	7,726	7,961	9,652	10,394
Renua	Billy Timmins	8.0	5,510	5,737	5,762	5,858	6,017	6,231	6,667	6,910	7,279	8,359
Independent	Joe Behan	4.5	3,070	3,345	3,374	3,539	3,717	4,288	4,332	4,613	5,218	
Fianna Fáil	Jennifer Cuffe	4.3	2,990	3,179	3,192	3,249	3,339	3,448	3,548			
Labour	Anne Ferris	3.8	2,634	2,861	2,873	2,912	3,413	3,633	3,859	4,032		
Fine Gael	Avril Cronin	3.0	2,091	2,149	2,163	2,176	2,261	2,322				
Green	Steven Matthews	2.0	1,350	1,614	1,651	1,745						
AAA–PBP	Sharon Briggs	1.8	1,241	1,396	1,454	1,918	2,219					
AAA–PBP	Anna Doyle	0.8	539	612	655							
Independent	Charlie Keddy	0.6	447	476	520							
Direct Democracy	Kathrina Hutchinson	0.2	168	217								
Independent	Bob Kearns	0.2	112	120								
Electorate: 97,858 Valid: 68,804 Spoilt: 596 (0.9%) Quota: 11,468 Turnout: 69,400 (70.9%)

=== 2011 general election ===
2011 general election: Wicklow
Party	Candidate	FPv%	Count																		
Party	Candidate	FPv%	1	2	3	4	5	6	7	8	9	10	11	12	13	14	15	16	17	18	19
Fine Gael	Andrew Doyle	14.2	10,035	10,038	10,040	10,056	10,070	10,106	10,117	10,133	10,151	10,207	10,264	10,566	10,882	11,087	11,622	11,991			
Fine Gael	Billy Timmins	13.0	9,165	9,167	9,171	9,181	9,194	9,202	9,213	9,224	9,241	9,253	9,320	9,467	9,756	10,184	10,450	10,729	11,867		
Fine Gael	Simon Harris	12.4	8,726	8,729	8,735	8,741	8,752	8,755	8,792	8,838	8,847	8,872	8,938	9,133	9,253	9,444	10,134	10,901	11,392	11,459	11,512
Sinn Féin	John Brady	10.1	7,089	7,090	7,099	7,115	7,120	7,144	7,163	7,187	7,220	7,269	7,404	7,676	7,887	8,027	8,626	9,037	9,797	9,839	9,854
Independent	Stephen Donnelly	9.2	6,530	6,536	6,557	6,571	6,604	6,624	6,647	6,692	6,732	6,792	6,919	7,389	7,508	7,670	8,576	8,980	9,909	9,946	9,966
Labour	Anne Ferris	7.7	5,436	5,439	5,452	5,456	5,469	5,476	5,481	5,514	5,559	5,577	5,657	5,997	6,925	7,036	7,713	10,243	10,948	11,042	11,070
Independent	Joe Behan	6.0	4,197	4,200	4,207	4,210	4,223	4,231	4,245	4,277	4,290	4,312	4,407	4,551	4,631	4,917					
Fianna Fáil	Dick Roche	5.5	3,891	3,891	3,895	3,898	3,921	3,926	3,944	3,964	3,967	3,977	4,010	4,057	4,129						
Fianna Fáil	Pat Fitzgerald	5.1	3,576	3,576	3,576	3,592	3,598	3,604	3,611	3,613	3,616	3,618	3,672	4,060	4,140	6,436	6,898	7,004			
Labour	Tom Fortune	4.9	3,420	3,421	3,423	3,423	3,427	3,435	3,468	3,482	3,495	3,507	3,551	3,659	4,807	4,931	5,282				
Labour	Conal Kavanagh	4.6	3,231	3,234	3,237	3,243	3,249	3,260	3,272	3,280	3,296	3,317	3,369	3,503							
Independent	Peter Dempsey	2.0	1,409	1,415	1,434	1,454	1,460	1,468	1,478	1,486	1,497	1,516	1,673								
Green	Niall Byrne	1.5	1,026	1,027	1,031	1,033	1,038	1,042	1,045	1,054	1,073	1,092	1,113								
Independent	Nicky Kelly	0.7	518	522	523	534	536	542	549	556	571	585									
Independent	Donal Kiernan	0.6	403	405	405	406	415	419	433	444	456	472									
Fís Nua	Gerry Kinsella (Note: Although Fís Nua was registered as a political party on 4 February 2011, the party's name did not appear on the ballot, as the Register of Political Parties in use was that in force on 1 February 2011, when the writ for the general election was issued.)	0.5	324	325	327	331	335	346	359	362	394										
Fís Nua	Pat Kavanagh	0.4	291	293	298	300	302	313	322	327											
Independent	Eugene Finnegan	0.4	286	288	293	295	303	305	309												
Independent	Charlie Keddy	0.3	233	236	241	261	262	266													
Independent	Michael Mulvihill	0.3	187	188	191	195	196														
Independent	Anthony Fitzgerald	0.3	184	184	185	186															
Independent	Jim Tallon	0.2	166	166	169																
Independent	Thomas Clarke	0.1	103	125																	
Independent	Kevin Carroll	0.1	74																		
Electorate: 95,339 Valid: 70,579 Spoilt: 702 (1.1%) Quota: 11,764 Turnout: 71,311 (74.8%)

=== 2007 general election ===
2007 general election: Wicklow
Party	Candidate	FPv%	Count								
Party	Candidate	FPv%	1	2	3	4	5	6	7	8	9
Fianna Fáil	Dick Roche	15.8	10,246	10,473	10,674	11,096					
Fianna Fáil	Joe Behan	14.5	9,431	9,673	9,956	10,223	10,892				
Fine Gael	Billy Timmins	12.4	8,072	8,177	8,309	8,973	9,157	9,604	9,674	10,431	11,288
Fine Gael	Andrew Doyle	10.7	6,961	7,070	7,279	7,514	7,780	8,231	8,250	9,285	10,202
Labour	Liz McManus	10.4	6,751	6,874	7,356	7,544	8,030	9,649	9,678	13,118	
Fianna Fáil	Pat Fitzgerald	7.6	5,029	5,149	5,193	5,561	5,744	7,127	7,271	7,771	8,016
Green	Déirdre de Búrca	7.4	4,790	4,983	5,706	5,834	6,730	7,131	7,144		
Labour	Nicky Kelly	5.9	3,857	3,901	3,935	4,297	4,702				
Sinn Féin	John Brady	5.0	3,234	3,305	3,383	3,551					
Independent	Pat Doran	4.4	2,841	2,893	3,009						
Independent	Evelyn Cawley	3.5	2,246	2,387							
Progressive Democrats	Dónal Ó Siocháin	1.4	903								
People Before Profit	Carmel McKenna	0.6	365								
Independent	Jim Tallon	0.2	120								
Fathers Rights	Norman Newell	0.1	79								
Electorate: 91,492 Valid: 64,925 Spoilt: 554 (0.9%) Quota: 10,821 Turnout: 65,479 (71.6%)

=== 2002 general election ===
2002 general election: Wicklow
Party	Candidate	FPv%	Count									
Party	Candidate	FPv%	1	2	3	4	5	6	7	8	9	10
Fianna Fáil	Dick Roche	16.9	9,213									
Fianna Fáil	Joe Jacob	14.4	7,836	7,899	7,913	7,926	8,045	8,073	8,306	8,969	9,125	
Labour	Liz McManus	13.9	7,595	7,612	7,636	7,693	7,901	8,120	8,310	10,520		
Fine Gael	Billy Timmins	13.5	7,372	7,377	7,388	7,398	7,466	8,396	8,476	9,110		
Labour	Nicky Kelly	12.0	6,529	6,532	6,536	6,555	6,662	6,691	6,910	7,809	8,657	8,669
Independent	Mildred Fox	11.6	6,324	6,342	6,364	6,410	6,642	6,726	6,975	8,247	8,669	8,688
Green	Déirdre de Búrca	5.9	3,208	3,212	3,240	3,277	3,500	3,561	4,026			
Labour	Jimmy O'Shaughnessy	3.7	2,029	2,031	2,032	2,032	2,128	2,148	2,188			
Sinn Féin	Mairéad Keane	2.8	1,527	1,530	1,536	1,546	1,649	1,659				
Fine Gael	Raymond O'Rourke	2.4	1,332	1,333	1,353	1,372	1,397					
Socialist Workers	Catherine Kennedy	0.7	399	400	412	425						
Independent	Robert Kearns	0.7	406	406	412	418						
Independent	Charlie Keddy	0.7	383	384	392	404						
Independent	Brian Kenny	0.4	236	237	247							
Independent	Barbara Hyland	0.3	171	171								
Electorate: 89,797 Valid: 54,560 Spoilt: 736 (1.3%) Quota: 9,094 Turnout: 55,296 (61.6%)

=== 1997 general election ===
1997 general election: Wicklow
Party	Candidate	FPv%	Count								
Party	Candidate	FPv%	1	2	3	4	5	6	7	8	9
Fianna Fáil	Joe Jacob	11.8	6,150	6,185	6,536	6,580	6,665	7,992	8,066	8,997	
Fianna Fáil	Dick Roche	11.7	6,101	6,200	6,575	6,672	6,715	7,873	8,156	8,725	
Independent	Mildred Fox	10.7	5,590	5,911	6,178	6,360	6,477	6,907	7,344	8,252	8,348
Labour	Liam Kavanagh	10.1	5,293	5,364	5,451	6,224	6,421	6,550	6,992	7,983	8,071
Democratic Left	Liz McManus	10.0	5,226	5,581	5,722	6,185	6,378	6,683	7,442	8,498	8,568
Fine Gael	Billy Timmins	9.9	5,171	5,225	5,298	5,364	5,986	6,065	8,174	8,500	8,526
Independent	Nicky Kelly	9.6	4,995	5,178	5,247	5,299	5,519	5,633	5,689		
Fianna Fáil	Michael D. Lawlor	6.4	3,368	3,423	3,655	3,703	3,731				
Fine Gael	George Jones	5.9	3,116	3,218	3,300	3,505	4,232	4,323			
Fine Gael	Tom Honan	3.8	2,021	2,065	2,117	2,260					
Labour	Tim Collins	3.7	1,924	2,072	2,106						
Progressive Democrats	Mary Heaslip	3.3	1,726	1,808							
Green	Alex Perkins	2.5	1,299								
Independent	Charlie Keddy	0.6	316								
Electorate: 80,458 Valid: 52,296 Spoilt: 434 (0.8%) Quota: 8,717 Turnout: 52,730 (65.5%)

=== 1995 by-election ===
Independent TD Johnny Fox died on 17 March 1995. A by-election was held to fill the vacancy on 29 June 1995. The seat was won by the Independent candidate Mildred Fox, daughter of the deceased TD.

1995 by-election: Wicklow
Party	Candidate	FPv%	Count							
Party	Candidate	FPv%	1	2	3	4	5	6	7	8
Independent	Mildred Fox	26.9	11,724	11,872	12,627	13,119	13,928	15,131	17,793	22,922
Fianna Fáil	Dick Roche	23.1	10,060	10,135	10,352	10,536	11,194	11,968	13,056	14,895
Fine Gael	Tom Honan	12.6	5,503	5,529	5,725	5,912	6,246	7,996	9,971	
Labour	Tim Collins	11.6	5,064	5,139	5,279	5,591	6,527	7,203		
Independent	Nicky Kelly	10.5	4,556	4,635	4,729	4,943	5,250			
Democratic Left	John McManus	6.5	2,841	2,907	2,956	3,249				
Independent	Susan Philips	3.7	1,627	1,663						
Green	Emer Singleton	3.6	1,565	1,674	1,816					
Independent	Charlie Keddy	0.6	254							
Workers' Party	Frank Hayes	0.5	211							
Natural Law	Desmond Garrett	0.2	104							
Independent	Jim Tallon	0.2	80							
Electorate: 81,525 Valid: 43,589 Quota: 21,795 Turnout: 53.5%

=== 1992 general election ===
1992 general election: Wicklow
Party	Candidate	FPv%	Count													
Party	Candidate	FPv%	1	2	3	4	5	6	7	8	9	10	11	12	13	14
Labour	Liam Kavanagh	22.8	11,843													
Fianna Fáil	Joe Jacob	12.5	6,475	6,813	6,819	6,877	6,939	7,048	7,107	7,772	7,863	8,258	8,651			
Democratic Left	Liz McManus	10.6	5,510	6,530	6,543	6,706	6,804	6,875	7,068	7,096	7,752	8,088	8,484	9,162		
Fianna Fáil	Dick Roche	10.1	5,250	5,394	5,394	5,465	5,569	5,660	5,778	6,347	6,462	6,531	6,604	6,858	7,119	7,227
Independent	Johnny Fox	9.2	4,749	5,056	5,062	5,154	5,413	5,631	5,801	5,842	6,208	6,350	6,498	6,846	7,456	7,656
Fine Gael	Godfrey Timmins	8.9	4,612	5,010	5,014	5,055	5,111	5,254	5,481	5,600	5,700	5,833	6,627	9,520		
Fine Gael	Shane Ross	5.6	2,903	3,107	3,107	3,128	3,170	3,336	3,749	3,786	3,972	3,995	4,626			
Independent	Vincent McElheron	3.5	1,806	1,950	1,953	1,975	2,010	2,024	2,055	2,070	2,135					
Fine Gael	Thomas Honan	3.2	1,676	1,832	1,835	1,853	1,877	1,918	2,046	2,067	2,149	2,914				
Fianna Fáil	Eamon Kane	2.7	1,376	1,404	1,404	1,422	1,439	1,630	1,660							
Progressive Democrats	Liam Nolan	2.6	1,367	1,475	1,476	1,488	1,514	1,587								
Green	Nuala Ahern	2.6	1,346	1,493	1,500	1,612	1,723	1,836	1,964	1,985						
Independent	Pat Dunlea	2.5	1,311	1,350	1,359	1,377	1,395									
Christian Centrist	John Hartnett	1.8	906	931	934	959										
Sinn Féin	Ken O'Connell	0.6	299	314	316											
Sinn Féin	Gerry O'Neill	0.3	179	191	192											
Workers' Party	Frank Hayes	0.3	139	227	229											
Independent	Barbara Hyland	0.2	87	97	100											
Independent	Leo Armstrong	0.1	57	68												
Electorate: 77,133 Valid: 51,891 Spoilt: 743 (1.4%) Quota: 8,649 Turnout: 52,634 (68.2%)

=== 1989 general election ===
1989 general election: Wicklow
Party	Candidate	FPv%	Count						
Party	Candidate	FPv%	1	2	3	4	5	6	7
Labour	Liam Kavanagh	20.1	8,541						
Fianna Fáil	Joe Jacob	19.9	8,454	8,462	8,539				
Fianna Fáil	Dick Roche	18.2	7,707	7,712	7,793	7,808	8,006	8,289	8,310
Fine Gael	Godfrey Timmins	18.1	7,661	7,676	7,742	7,748	7,959	8,780	
Fine Gael	George Jones	10.2	4,333	4,338	4,435	4,459	4,498	5,323	5,569
Progressive Democrats	Ciarán Murphy	5.0	2,109	2,114	2,203	2,208	2,291		
Workers' Party	Dermot Tobin	4.8	2,049	2,059	2,176	2,177	2,441	2,636	2,661
Independent	Seán Wolahan	2.2	919	922	1,020	1,020			
Independent	Barbara Hyland	1.6	666	668					
Electorate: 66,429 Valid: 42,439 Quota: 8,488 Turnout: 63.9%

=== 1987 general election ===
1987 general election: Wicklow
Party	Candidate	FPv%	Count							
Party	Candidate	FPv%	1	2	3	4	5	6	7	8
Fianna Fáil	Joe Jacob	19.2	8,825	8,876	8,938	9,196	9,263			
Labour	Liam Kavanagh	16.9	7,754	7,880	7,973	8,498	8,656	10,247		
Fine Gael	Gemma Hussey	14.1	6,474	6,589	6,692	6,740	7,042	7,367	9,238	
Fianna Fáil	Dick Roche	13.4	6,163	6,241	6,251	6,334	6,390	7,313	7,855	8,283
Fine Gael	Godfrey Timmins	12.4	5,710	5,741	5,813	5,911	6,024	6,213	7,463	7,853
Workers' Party	John McManus	7.6	3,509	3,744	3,765	3,987	4,079			
Progressive Democrats	Aidan Murphy	5.3	2,461	2,509	2,745	2,776	4,390	4,931		
Progressive Democrats	Donal Atkins	4.4	2,014	2,069	2,411	2,452				
Independent	Seán Wolahan	2.7	1,243	1,307	1,365					
Progressive Democrats	Michael Healy	2.1	975	1,009						
Green	Liam de Siuin	1.4	658							
Independent	Barbara Hyland	0.5	217							
Electorate: 64,272 Valid: 46,003 Quota: 9,202 Turnout: 71.6%

=== November 1982 general election ===
November 1982 general election: Wicklow
Party	Candidate	FPv%	Count					
Party	Candidate	FPv%	1	2	3	4	5	6
Fine Gael	Godfrey Timmins	18.8	7,886	7,928	7,983	8,111	8,393	9,114
Labour	Liam Kavanagh	18.3	7,681	7,753	7,856	8,280	9,984	
Fine Gael	Gemma Hussey	18.0	7,552	7,677	7,761	7,882	8,439	
Fianna Fáil	Paudge Brennan	13.8	5,806	5,833	6,416	7,734	8,126	8,330
Fianna Fáil	Ciarán Murphy	11.8	4,938	4,970	5,483	6,150	6,719	7,004
Workers' Party	John McManus	8.2	3,431	3,548	3,610	3,762		
Fianna Fáil	Declan Connolly	6.2	2,614	2,626	2,857			
Fianna Fáil	Johnny Fox	3.9	1,624	1,643				
Independent	Liam de Siuin	1.1	463					
Electorate: 58,213 Valid: 41,995 Quota: 8,400 Turnout: 72.1%

=== February 1982 general election ===
February 1982 general election: Wicklow
Party	Candidate	FPv%	Count			
Party	Candidate	FPv%	1	2	3	4
Labour	Liam Kavanagh	20.0	8,026			
Fine Gael	Godfrey Timmins	18.5	7,400	7,426	7,473	7,904
Fine Gael	Gemma Hussey	17.8	7,112	7,137	7,178	8,042
Fianna Fáil	Paudge Brennan	17.3	6,930	6,954	7,340	7,750
Fianna Fáil	Ciarán Murphy	16.5	6,616	6,632	7,186	7,902
Sinn Féin The Workers' Party	John McManus	6.8	2,739	2,783	2,820	
Fianna Fáil	Denis Teevan	2.7	1,072	1,086		
Independent	Jim Tallon	0.4	163			
Electorate: 56,097 Valid: 40,058 Spoilt: 324 (0.8%) Quota: 8,012 Turnout: 40,382 (71.9%)

=== 1981 general election ===
1981 general election: Wicklow
Party	Candidate	FPv%	Count							
Party	Candidate	FPv%	1	2	3	4	5	6	7	8
Fine Gael	Godfrey Timmins	16.8	6,899	6,933	7,520	7,835	8,159	8,529		
Labour	Liam Kavanagh	14.4	5,894	5,983	6,192	6,245	7,286	7,868	7,915	8,064
Fianna Fáil	Ciarán Murphy	14.3	5,881	5,961	6,054	6,911	7,488	8,736		
Fine Gael	Gemma Hussey	13.5	5,524	5,557	6,438	6,539	7,331	7,643	7,677	7,846
Fianna Fáil	Paudge Brennan	12.2	5,019	5,170	5,202	5,815	6,108	7,786	8,230	
Fianna Fáil	Declan Connolly	9.2	3,763	3,812	3,827	4,223	4,357			
Sinn Féin The Workers' Party	John McManus	7.2	2,974	3,248	3,344	3,387				
Fianna Fáil	Jim Ruttle	5.8	2,372	2,399	2,410					
Fine Gael	George Jones	4.7	1,925	1,936						
Independent	Richard O'Carroll	1.8	734							
Independent	Jim Tallon	0.2	65							
Electorate: 56,080 Valid: 41,050 Quota: 8,211 Turnout: 73.2%

=== 1977 general election ===
1977 general election: Wicklow
Party	Candidate	FPv%	Count						
Party	Candidate	FPv%	1	2	3	4	5	6	7
Fianna Fáil	Ciarán Murphy	24.7	8,163	8,317					
Labour	Liam Kavanagh	19.8	6,540	6,725	6,733	7,310	7,407	7,764	8,732
Fine Gael	Godfrey Timmins	19.1	6,291	6,339	6,342	6,514	6,832	9,326	
Fianna Fáil	Bernard Keating	13.5	4,465	4,524	4,534	4,788	6,732	6,851	6,953
Fine Gael	Charlie Keegan	8.9	2,939	2,984	2,987	3,066	3,146		
Fianna Fáil	Jimmy Miley	7.4	2,437	2,459	2,477	2,659			
Sinn Féin The Workers' Party	John McManus	3.7	1,231	1,612	1,631				
Irish Republican Socialist	Seamus Costello	2.9	955						
Electorate: 46,372 Valid: 33,021 Quota: 8,256 Turnout: 71.2%

=== 1973 general election ===
1973 general election: Wicklow
Party	Candidate	FPv%	Count						
Party	Candidate	FPv%	1	2	3	4	5	6	7
Fine Gael	Godfrey Timmins	23.6	6,960	7,097	7,451				
Fianna Fáil	Ciarán Murphy	15.3	4,521	4,553	4,767	4,770	5,941	6,366	6,602
Fianna Fáil	Jimmy Miley	13.9	4,095	4,115	4,201	4,202	5,019	5,714	5,907
Labour	Liam Kavanagh	10.9	3,231	3,894	4,555	4,578	4,685	5,379	7,474
Fine Gael	Mary Walsh	9.7	2,858	2,913	3,010	3,043	3,119	3,708	
Independent	Paudge Brennan	8.5	2,500	2,549	2,946	2,955	3,039		
Fianna Fáil	Basil Phelan	7.8	2,296	2,304	2,336	2,337			
Sinn Féin	Seamus Costello	6.7	1,966	2,084					
Labour	Thomas Byrne	3.7	1,094						
Electorate: 39,389 Valid: 29,521 Quota: 7,381 Turnout: 74.9%

=== 1969 general election ===
1969 general election: Wicklow
Party	Candidate	FPv%	Count				
Party	Candidate	FPv%	1	2	3	4	5
Fianna Fáil	Paudge Brennan	28.6	8,035				
Fine Gael	Michael O'Higgins	17.4	4,883	4,919	5,022	5,274	5,543
Fine Gael	Godfrey Timmins	16.3	4,597	4,634	4,756	4,950	5,595
Labour	Liam Kavanagh	14.1	3,963	4,043	4,176	6,126	6,444
Labour	William Lawless	9.1	2,550	2,591	2,745		
Fianna Fáil	Basil Phelan	7.6	2,129	2,401			
Fianna Fáil	Jimmy Miley	6.9	1,940	2,484	4,258	4,400	
Electorate: 37,578 Valid: 28,097 Quota: 7,025 Turnout: 74.8%

=== 1968 by-election ===
Labour Party TD James Everett died on 18 December 1967. A by-election was held to fill the vacancy on 14 March 1968.

1968 by-election: Wicklow
Party	Candidate	FPv%	Count				
Party	Candidate	FPv%	1	2	3	4	5
Fianna Fáil	Nancy O'Neill	37.2	9,788	9,829	9,945	10,343	12,050
Fine Gael	Godfrey Timmins	30.6	8,035	8,089	8,280	8,728	12,596
Labour	Liam Kavanagh	21.9	5,761	5,796	5,892	6,797	
Sinn Féin	Seamus Costello	7.6	2,009	2,024	2,081		
Liberal	Kevin McLeavey	1.9	509	526			
Independent	James J. Tallon	0.7	191				
Electorate: 36,658 Valid: 26,293 Quota: 13,147 Turnout: 71.7%

=== 1965 general election ===
1965 general election: Wicklow
Party	Candidate	FPv%	Count		
Party	Candidate	FPv%	1	2	3
Fianna Fáil	Paudge Brennan	35.0	8,806		
Labour	James Everett	23.0	5,799	6,028	6,557
Fine Gael	Michael O'Higgins	16.5	4,141	4,217	6,711
Fianna Fáil	Nancy O'Neill	13.0	3,282	5,317	5,469
Fine Gael	Mark Deering	12.5	3,139	3,313	
Electorate: 35,213 Valid: 25,167 Quota: 6,292 Turnout: 71.5%

=== 1961 general election ===
1961 general election: Wicklow
Party	Candidate	FPv%	Count				
Party	Candidate	FPv%	1	2	3	4	5
Fianna Fáil	Paudge Brennan	32.4	7,582				
Labour	James Everett	23.8	5,575	5,815	6,065		
Fine Gael	Michael O'Higgins	15.0	3,516	3,579	3,741	3,827	6,335
Fine Gael	Godfrey Timmins	14.4	3,368	3,465	3,526	3,557	
Fianna Fáil	James O'Toole	11.5	2,679	3,985	4,130	4,194	4,590
Independent	Henry McAuliffe	2.9	674	701			
Electorate: 35,394 Valid: 23,394 Quota: 5,849 Turnout: 66.1%

=== 1957 general election ===
1957 general election: Wicklow
Party	Candidate	FPv%	Count			
Party	Candidate	FPv%	1	2	3	4
Fianna Fáil	Paudge Brennan	40.1	9,477			
Labour	James Everett	22.9	5,423	5,698	5,827	6,129
Fine Gael	Mark Deering	18.5	4,371	4,663	4,737	5,514
Fianna Fáil	James O'Toole	13.9	3,278	6,148		
Fine Gael	Brendan Donnelly	4.6	1,089	1,219	1,254	
Electorate: 35,765 Valid: 23,638 Quota: 5,910 Turnout: 66.1%

=== 1954 general election ===
1954 general election: Wicklow
Party	Candidate	FPv%	Count			
Party	Candidate	FPv%	1	2	3	4
Fine Gael	Mark Deering	27.8	7,527			
Labour	James Everett	26.3	7,115			
Fianna Fáil	Paudge Brennan	21.2	5,741	5,774	5,831	7,065
Fianna Fáil	Patrick Cogan	11.3	3,053	3,094	3,112	3,681
Fianna Fáil	Mary Ledwidge	7.6	2,046	2,058	2,103	
Fine Gael	Brendan Donnelly	5.8	1,581	2,256	2,485	2,681
Electorate: 37,088 Valid: 27,063 Quota: 6,766 Turnout: 73.0%

=== 1953 by-election ===
Fianna Fáil TD Thomas Brennan died on 22 January 1953. A by-election was held to fill the vacancy on 18 June 1953.

1953 by-election: Wicklow
Party	Candidate	FPv%	Count				
Party	Candidate	FPv%	1	2	3	4	5
Fianna Fáil	Paudge Brennan	27.9	7,788	8,314	9,261	9,630	10,852
Labour	James J. McCrea	24.8	6,915	7,020	7,537	8,792	
Fine Gael	Mark Deering	23.1	6,433	7,382	7,607	8,833	14,672
Clann na Poblachta	William Clarke	9.2	2,568	2,804	3,125		
Independent	William Lawless	7.8	2,164	2,256			
Independent	Elizabeth Bobbett	7.3	2,029				
Electorate: 37,470 Valid: 27,897 Quota: 13,949 Turnout: 74.5%

=== 1951 general election ===
1951 general election: Wicklow
Party	Candidate	FPv%	Count			
Party	Candidate	FPv%	1	2	3	4
Labour	James Everett	24.2	6,535	6,563	8,638	
Fianna Fáil	Thomas Brennan	22.7	6,138	6,473	6,630	6,776
Fianna Fáil	Peter Ledwidge	19.2	5,178	5,653	5,826	6,037
Independent	Patrick Cogan	16.1	4,350	4,391	5,739	6,645
Fine Gael	Mark Deering	14.3	3,872	3,907		
Fianna Fáil	Joseph Groome	3.4	922			
Electorate: 37,772 Valid: 26,995 Quota: 6,749 Turnout: 71.5%

=== 1948 general election ===
1948 general election: Wicklow
Party	Candidate	FPv%	Count							
Party	Candidate	FPv%	1	2	3	4	5	6	7	8
National Labour Party	James Everett	18.3	4,834	4,879	5,005	5,424	6,198	6,952		
Fianna Fáil	Thomas Brennan	15.7	4,142	4,169	4,976	5,375	5,530	8,466		
Fine Gael	Edmund Sweetman	14.9	3,941	3,979	4,038	4,298	4,911	4,999	5,169	5,237
Independent	Patrick Cogan	13.7	3,618	3,646	3,686	3,945	4,434	4,768	5,418	5,573
Fianna Fáil	Christopher Byrne	12.9	3,414	3,426	4,081	4,258	4,416			
Labour	James J. McCrea	7.8	2,072	2,147	2,195					
Clann na Poblachta	William Clarke	6.9	1,824	2,401	2,436	2,960				
Fianna Fáil	Thomas F. O'Reilly	6.7	1,760	1,794						
Clann na Poblachta	Brendan Hyland	3.2	844							
Electorate: 37,311 Valid: 26,449 Quota: 6,613 Turnout: 70.9%

=== 1944 general election ===
Figures for the 6th count are not available.

1944 general election: Wicklow
Party	Candidate	FPv%	Count						
Party	Candidate	FPv%	1	2	3	4	5	6	7
National Labour Party	James Everett	19.2	4,992	5,048	5,502	5,907	6,845		
Fianna Fáil	Thomas Brennan	18.9	4,903	4,934	5,136	5,370	5,496	N/A	5,962
Fianna Fáil	Christopher Byrne	17.6	4,568	4,609	4,812	5,062	5,229	N/A	5,875
Clann na Talmhan	Patrick Cogan	17.4	4,519	4,615	4,816	5,075	7,519		
Fine Gael	Edmund Sweetman	13.6	3,548	3,810	3,971	4,257			
Labour	Edward Byrne	5.8	1,508	1,559	1,633				
Independent	William Clarke	5.1	1,325	1,391					
Independent	Henry Byrne	2.4	634						
Electorate: 38,937 Valid: 25,997 Quota: 6,500 Turnout: 66.8%

=== 1943 general election ===
Full figures for the 2nd count are not available.

1943 general election: Wicklow
Party	Candidate	FPv%	Count				
Party	Candidate	FPv%	1	2	3	4	5
Labour	James Everett	25.6	7,144				
Clann na Talmhan	Patrick Cogan	18.4	5,130	N/A	5,626	6,290	6,592
Fianna Fáil	Christopher Byrne	16.1	4,485	N/A	4,760	4,838	7,798
Fianna Fáil	Thomas Brennan	13.2	3,691	N/A	3,868	4,050	
Fine Gael	Ralph Barry	12.4	3,452	N/A	3,557	5,111	5,221
Fine Gael	Jacob Bourne	9.1	2,554	N/A	2,591		
Labour	Peter O'Reilly	5.3	1,476	1,585			
Electorate: 38,937 Valid: 27,932 Quota: 6,984 Turnout: 71.7%

=== 1938 general election ===
1938 general election: Wicklow
Party	Candidate	FPv%	Count		
Party	Candidate	FPv%	1	2	3
Fianna Fáil	Séamus Moore	33.1	9,497		
Labour	James Everett	28.3	8,125		
Fine Gael	Dermot O'Mahony	20.2	5,799	6,616	7,111
Independent	Patrick Cogan	18.4	5,285	6,788	7,241
Electorate: 37,884 Valid: 28,706 Quota: 7,177 Turnout: 75.8%

=== 1937 general election ===
1937 general election: Wicklow
Party	Candidate	FPv%	Count		
Party	Candidate	FPv%	1	2	3
Labour	James Everett	29.4	8,629		
Fine Gael	Dermot O'Mahony	23.0	6,771	6,952	7,121
Fianna Fáil	Séamus Moore	19.9	5,861	6,438	9,176
Independent	Patrick Cogan	15.6	4,580	4,717	5,218
Fianna Fáil	Christopher Byrne	12.1	3,558	3,942	
Electorate: 38,171 Valid: 29,399 Quota: 7,350 Turnout: 77.0%

=== 1933 general election ===
1933 general election: Wicklow
Party	Candidate	FPv%	Count	
Party	Candidate	FPv%	1	2
Fianna Fáil	Séamus Moore	31.8	8,995	
Cumann na nGaedheal	Dermot O'Mahony	26.7	7,564	
Labour	James Everett	23.6	6,684	8,526
National Centre Party	David Haskins	17.8	5,045	5,125
Electorate: 34,808 Valid: 28,288 Quota: 7,073 Turnout: 81.3%

=== 1932 general election ===
1932 general election: Wicklow
Party	Candidate	FPv%	Count			
Party	Candidate	FPv%	1	2	3	4
Cumann na nGaedheal	Dermot O'Mahony	26.8	7,034			
Labour	James Everett	23.5	6,157	6,183	6,439	6,880
Fianna Fáil	Séamus Moore	19.6	5,135	5,145	6,446	6,548
Independent	Christopher Byrne	16.5	4,325	4,386	4,506	5,775
Cumann na nGaedheal	Laurence O'Toole	7.0	1,837	2,215	2,237	
Fianna Fáil	Robert Devereux	6.6	1,736	1,738		
Electorate: 34,420 Valid: 26,224 Quota: 6,557 Turnout: 76.2%

=== September 1927 general election ===
September 1927 general election: Wicklow
Party	Candidate	FPv%	Count		
Party	Candidate	FPv%	1	2	3
Cumann na nGaedheal	Dermot O'Mahony	27.8	6,861		
Fianna Fáil	Séamus Moore	23.2	5,729	5,742	5,910
Labour	James Everett	22.1	5,438	5,512	5,814
Independent	Christopher Byrne	15.3	3,761	3,859	5,787
Farmers' Party	Richard Wilson	11.6	2,869	3,380	
Electorate: 35,044 Valid: 24,658 Quota: 6,165 Turnout: 70.4%

=== June 1927 general election ===
June 1927 general election: Wicklow
Party	Candidate	FPv%	Count			
Party	Candidate	FPv%	1	2	3	4
Labour	James Everett	28.8	6,985			
Fianna Fáil	Séamus Moore	21.7	5,261	5,687	5,943	6,907
Cumann na nGaedheal	Dermot O'Mahony	16.5	3,988	4,096	4,820	5,644
Farmers' Party	Richard Wilson	12.6	3,056	3,079	3,722	4,523
Independent	Christopher Byrne	11.2	2,716	3,014	3,430	
National League	Alan Patten	9.1	2,206	2,282		
Electorate: 35,044 Valid: 24,212 Quota: 6,054 Turnout: 69.1%

=== 1923 general election ===
1923 general election: Wicklow
Party	Candidate	FPv%	Count				
Party	Candidate	FPv%	1	2	3	4	5
Cumann na nGaedheal	Christopher Byrne	34.6	7,932				
Labour	James Everett	19.4	4,450	5,235	5,960		
Farmers' Party	Richard Wilson	18.7	4,281	5,170	5,232	5,299	6,590
Republican	Robert Barton	18.4	4,218	4,273	4,324	4,467	4,530
Independent	Joseph Moore	5.2	1,188	1,509	1,543	1,568	
Labour	Charles Gaule	3.6	830	987			
Electorate: 36,753 Valid: 22,899 Quota: 5,725 Turnout: 62.3%

== See also ==
- Dáil constituencies
- Elections in the Republic of Ireland
- Politics of the Republic of Ireland
- List of Dáil by-elections
- List of political parties in the Republic of Ireland
