= Art O'Connor =

Irish politician, judge, and Senior counsel (1888–1950)

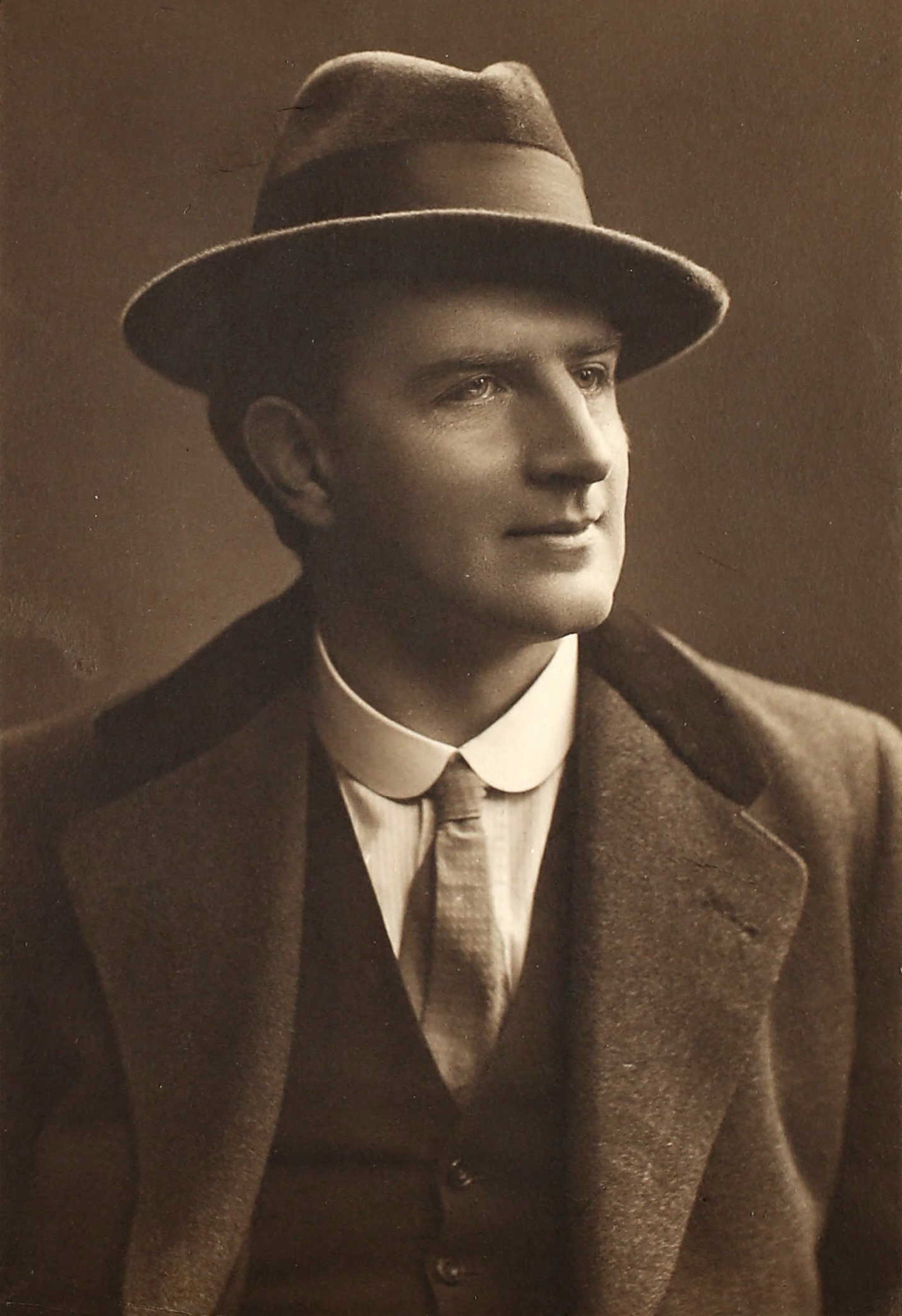
- O'Connor, c. 1920s

Secretary for Agriculture
- In office 26 August 1921 – 9 January 1922
- Preceded by: Robert Barton
- Succeeded by: Fionán Lynch

Teachta Dála
- In office May 1921 – June 1922
- Constituency: Kildare–Wicklow
- In office December 1918 – May 1921
- Constituency: Kildare South

Personal details
- Born: 18 May 1888 Celbridge, County Kildare, Ireland
- Died: 10 May 1950 (aged 61) Celbridge, County Kildare, Ireland
- Party: Sinn Féin
- Education: Trinity College Dublin

Arthur James Kickham O'Connor (18 May 1888 – 10 May 1950) was an Irish politician, lawyer and judge.

== Early life ==
He was born in 1888, the second son of Arthur O'Connor of Elm Hall, Celbridge, County Kildare (1834–1907) and his second wife Elizabeth (née Saul). He was educated at Blackrock College, County Dublin. He obtained the dispensation which was at that time required by Catholics in order to study engineering at the then almost exclusively Protestant Trinity College Dublin, from which he duly graduated in 1911.

== Politics ==
O'Connor was elected Sinn Féin MP for South Kildare at the 1918 general election. In January 1919 Sinn Féin MPs, who had been elected in the Westminster elections of 1918, refused to recognise the Parliament of the United Kingdom and instead assembled as a unicameral revolutionary parliament called Dáil Éireann. In the First Dáil, he was appointed Substitute Director of Agriculture during the absence of Robert Barton.

In the 1921 election, he was elected for Kildare–Wicklow and took his seat in the Second Dáil. He held the position of Minister of Agriculture from 26 August 1921 to 9 January 1922. O'Connor voted against the Anglo-Irish Treaty and joined the Republican side in the Irish Civil War. He lost his seat at the 1922 general election. He unsuccessfully contested the 1923 general election for the new constituency of Kildare and was also unsuccessful at the 1926 Leix–Offaly by-election.

In March 1926, Éamon de Valera resigned as titular President of the Irish Republic following his departure from Sinn Féin. O'Connor succeeded him to that nominal role. He unsuccessfully contested the June 1927 general election in Kildare.

== Legal career ==
He returned to Trinity College Dublin to study law. After graduating he was called to the bar, necessitating his recognition of the Irish Free State, and resignation as titular President of the Republic in 1927. He became a senior counsel in 1944. He was appointed as a judge of the Circuit Court for Cork city in 1947.

== Family life ==
He never married and died suddenly at his family home, Elm Hall, in 1950, and is buried in Donacomper Cemetery, Celbridge. His brothers were also involved in the Irish Republican movement and his sister Fanny was a member of Cumann na mBan. His brother Daniel was the State Solicitor for Kildare.

Parliament of the United Kingdom
Preceded by Denis Kilbride	Member of Parliament for South Kildare; 1918–1922	Constituency abolished
Oireachtas
New constituency	TD for South Kildare; 1918–1921	Constituency succeeded by Kildare–Wicklow
Political offices
Preceded by Robert Barton	Secretary for Agriculture; 1921–1922	Succeeded by Patrick Hogan

Dáil	Election	Deputy (Party)	Deputy (Party)	Deputy (Party)	Deputy (Party)	Deputy (Party)
2nd	1921	Erskine Childers (SF)	Domhnall Ua Buachalla (SF)	Robert Barton (SF)	Christopher Byrne (SF)	Art O'Connor (SF)
3rd	1922	Hugh Colohan (Lab)	James Everett (Lab)	Robert Barton (AT-SF)	Christopher Byrne (PT-SF)	Richard Wilson (FP)
4th	1923	Constituency abolished. See Kildare and Wicklow				
