= Christopher Byrne (politician) =

Irish politician (1886–1958)

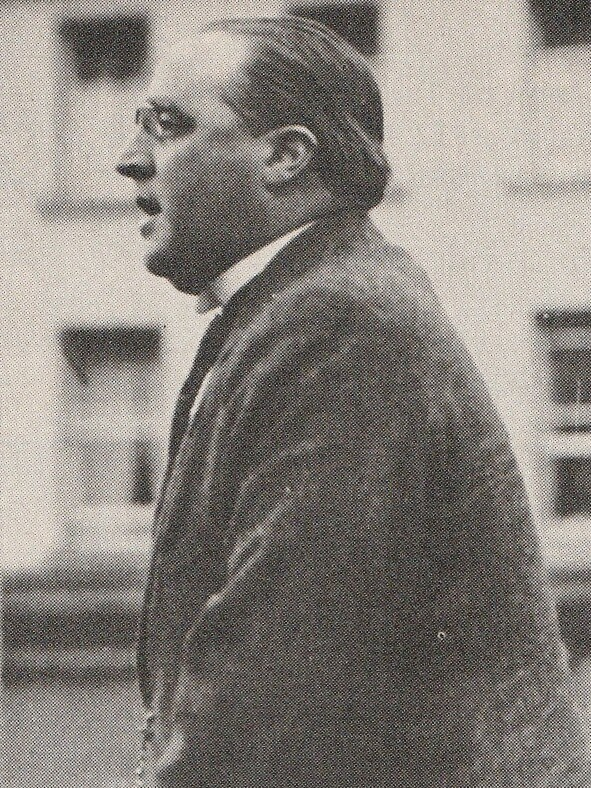
- Byrne, c.1920s

Senator
- In office 27 April 1938 – 8 September 1943
- Constituency: Administrative Panel

Teachta Dála
- In office June 1943 – May 1944
- In office August 1923 – June 1927
- Constituency: Wicklow
- In office May 1921 – August 1923
- Constituency: Kildare–Wicklow

Personal details
- Born: 1886 Blackrock, Dublin, Ireland
- Died: 12 April 1958 (aged 71) Dublin, Ireland
- Party: Sinn Féin; Cumann na nGaedheal; Clann Éireann; Fianna Fáil
- Spouse: Lucy Cullen (m. 1919)
- Education: Blackrock College

Christopher Michael Byrne (1886 – 12 April 1958) was an Irish politician whose career as a Teachta Dála (TD) and Senator came in two distinct periods, separated by a decade's gap and a change of party. He was also involved in the Gaelic Athletic Association (GAA).

== Personal life ==
He was born in Blackrock, County Dublin, and educated at Blackrock College. He married Lucy Cullen in 1919; they had no children.

== Politics ==
Byrne was first elected to the Second Dáil as Sinn Féin TD for Kildare–Wicklow, at the 1921 general election. He was re-elected the following year as a pro-Treaty Sinn Féin candidate, and returned at the 1923 general election as a Cumann na nGaedheal TD for the Wicklow constituency. In 1926 he resigned from Cumann na nGaedheal over the results of the Irish Boundary Commission and later joined Clann Éireann with other politicians who also opposed the results.

He stood as an independent candidate at the June 1927 general election, but lost his seat. He was again unsuccessful as an independent at the next election, in September 1927 and at the 1932 general election. He did not stand in 1933, but was a Fianna Fáil candidate at the 1937 general election. He did not win a seat on that occasion, but in the subsequent elections to the 2nd Seanad in 1938, he was elected on the Administrative Panel and re-elected later that year to the 3rd Seanad.

At the 1943 general election, he returned to Dáil Éireann as a Fianna Fáil TD for Wicklow. However, he lost his seat at the 1944 general election, to his Fianna Fáil running-mate Thomas Brennan. Byrne stood again in the 1948 general election, but was not re-elected. He then retired from national politics.

== Sports ==
Byrne had membership of the Ashford GAA club. In 1907, he served as Ashford's delegate to the county convention which was held in Aughrim. In 1908, he became the Leinster Provincial Council representative on the GAA's Central Council. He served as chairman of the Wicklow County Board between 1931 and 1954.

Dáil	Election	Deputy (Party)	Deputy (Party)	Deputy (Party)	Deputy (Party)	Deputy (Party)
2nd	1921	Erskine Childers (SF)	Domhnall Ua Buachalla (SF)	Robert Barton (SF)	Christopher Byrne (SF)	Art O'Connor (SF)
3rd	1922	Hugh Colohan (Lab)	James Everett (Lab)	Robert Barton (AT-SF)	Christopher Byrne (PT-SF)	Richard Wilson (FP)
4th	1923	Constituency abolished. See Kildare and Wicklow				

Dáil	Election	Deputy (Party)	Deputy (Party)	Deputy (Party)	Deputy (Party)	Deputy (Party)
4th	1923	Christopher Byrne (CnaG)	James Everett (Lab)	Richard Wilson (FP)	3 seats 1923–1981	
5th	1927 (Jun)	Séamus Moore (FF)	James Everett (Lab)	Dermot O'Mahony (CnaG)	3 seats 1923–1981	
6th	1927 (Sep)	Séamus Moore (FF)	James Everett (Lab)	Dermot O'Mahony (CnaG)	3 seats 1923–1981	
7th	1932	Séamus Moore (FF)	James Everett (Lab)	Dermot O'Mahony (CnaG)	3 seats 1923–1981	
8th	1933	Séamus Moore (FF)	James Everett (Lab)	Dermot O'Mahony (CnaG)	3 seats 1923–1981	
9th	1937	Séamus Moore (FF)	James Everett (Lab)	Dermot O'Mahony (FG)	3 seats 1923–1981	
10th	1938	Séamus Moore (FF)	James Everett (Lab)	Patrick Cogan (Ind.)	3 seats 1923–1981	
11th	1943	Christopher Byrne (FF)	James Everett (Lab)	Patrick Cogan (CnaT)	3 seats 1923–1981	
12th	1944	Thomas Brennan (FF)	James Everett (NLP)	Patrick Cogan (CnaT)	3 seats 1923–1981	
13th	1948	Thomas Brennan (FF)	James Everett (NLP)	Patrick Cogan (Ind.)	3 seats 1923–1981	
14th	1951	Thomas Brennan (FF)	James Everett (Lab)	Patrick Cogan (Ind.)	3 seats 1923–1981	
14th	1953 by-election	Mark Deering (FG)	James Everett (Lab)	Patrick Cogan (Ind.)	3 seats 1923–1981	
15th	1954	Mark Deering (FG)	James Everett (Lab)	Paudge Brennan (FF)	3 seats 1923–1981	
16th	1957	James O'Toole (FF)	James Everett (Lab)	Paudge Brennan (FF)	3 seats 1923–1981	
17th	1961	Michael O'Higgins (FG)	James Everett (Lab)	Paudge Brennan (FF)	3 seats 1923–1981	
18th	1965	Michael O'Higgins (FG)	James Everett (Lab)	Paudge Brennan (FF)	3 seats 1923–1981	
18th	1968 by-election	Michael O'Higgins (FG)	Godfrey Timmins (FG)	Paudge Brennan (FF)	3 seats 1923–1981	
19th	1969	Liam Kavanagh (Lab)	Godfrey Timmins (FG)	Paudge Brennan (FF)	3 seats 1923–1981	
20th	1973	Liam Kavanagh (Lab)	Godfrey Timmins (FG)	Ciarán Murphy (FF)	3 seats 1923–1981	
21st	1977	Liam Kavanagh (Lab)	Godfrey Timmins (FG)	Ciarán Murphy (FF)	3 seats 1923–1981	
22nd	1981	Liam Kavanagh (Lab)	Godfrey Timmins (FG)	Ciarán Murphy (FF)	Paudge Brennan (FF)	4 seats 1981–1992
23rd	1982 (Feb)	Liam Kavanagh (Lab)	Godfrey Timmins (FG)	Ciarán Murphy (FF)	Gemma Hussey (FG)	4 seats 1981–1992
24th	1982 (Nov)	Liam Kavanagh (Lab)	Godfrey Timmins (FG)	Paudge Brennan (FF)	Gemma Hussey (FG)	4 seats 1981–1992
25th	1987	Liam Kavanagh (Lab)	Joe Jacob (FF)	Dick Roche (FF)	Gemma Hussey (FG)	4 seats 1981–1992
26th	1989	Liam Kavanagh (Lab)	Joe Jacob (FF)	Dick Roche (FF)	Godfrey Timmins (FG)	4 seats 1981–1992
27th	1992	Liam Kavanagh (Lab)	Joe Jacob (FF)	Liz McManus (DL)	Godfrey Timmins (FG)	Johnny Fox (Ind.)
27th	1995 by-election	Liam Kavanagh (Lab)	Joe Jacob (FF)	Liz McManus (DL)	Godfrey Timmins (FG)	Mildred Fox (Ind.)
28th	1997	Dick Roche (FF)	Joe Jacob (FF)	Liz McManus (DL)	Billy Timmins (FG)	Mildred Fox (Ind.)
29th	2002	Dick Roche (FF)	Joe Jacob (FF)	Liz McManus (Lab)	Billy Timmins (FG)	Mildred Fox (Ind.)
30th	2007	Dick Roche (FF)	Joe Behan (FF)	Liz McManus (Lab)	Billy Timmins (FG)	Andrew Doyle (FG)
31st	2011	Simon Harris (FG)	Stephen Donnelly (Ind.)	Anne Ferris (Lab)	Billy Timmins (FG)	Andrew Doyle (FG)
32nd	2016	Simon Harris (FG)	Stephen Donnelly (SD)	John Brady (SF)	Pat Casey (FF)	Andrew Doyle (FG)
33rd	2020	Simon Harris (FG)	Stephen Donnelly (FF)	John Brady (SF)	Jennifer Whitmore (SD)	Steven Matthews (GP)
34th	2024	Simon Harris (FG)	Edward Timmins (FG)	John Brady (SF)	Jennifer Whitmore (SD)	4 seats since 2024
