= Séamus Moore (politician) =

Irish politician (died 1940)

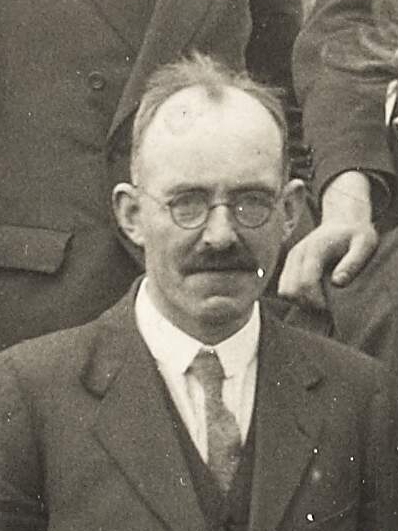
- Moore in 1927

Teachta Dála
- In office June 1927 – 14 June 1940
- Constituency: Wicklow

Personal details
- Died: 14 June 1940
- Party: Fianna Fáil

Séamus Moore (died 14 June 1940) was an Irish politician and businessman. He was first elected to Dáil Éireann as a Fianna Fáil Teachta Dála (TD) for the Wicklow constituency at the June 1927 general election. He was re-elected at each subsequent general election until his death in 1940. No by-election was held after his death.

He was Secretary of the Motor Traders' Association and lived at Beechmount Avenue in Ranelagh.

Dáil	Election	Deputy (Party)	Deputy (Party)	Deputy (Party)	Deputy (Party)	Deputy (Party)
4th	1923	Christopher Byrne (CnaG)	James Everett (Lab)	Richard Wilson (FP)	3 seats 1923–1981	
5th	1927 (Jun)	Séamus Moore (FF)	James Everett (Lab)	Dermot O'Mahony (CnaG)	3 seats 1923–1981	
6th	1927 (Sep)	Séamus Moore (FF)	James Everett (Lab)	Dermot O'Mahony (CnaG)	3 seats 1923–1981	
7th	1932	Séamus Moore (FF)	James Everett (Lab)	Dermot O'Mahony (CnaG)	3 seats 1923–1981	
8th	1933	Séamus Moore (FF)	James Everett (Lab)	Dermot O'Mahony (CnaG)	3 seats 1923–1981	
9th	1937	Séamus Moore (FF)	James Everett (Lab)	Dermot O'Mahony (FG)	3 seats 1923–1981	
10th	1938	Séamus Moore (FF)	James Everett (Lab)	Patrick Cogan (Ind.)	3 seats 1923–1981	
11th	1943	Christopher Byrne (FF)	James Everett (Lab)	Patrick Cogan (CnaT)	3 seats 1923–1981	
12th	1944	Thomas Brennan (FF)	James Everett (NLP)	Patrick Cogan (CnaT)	3 seats 1923–1981	
13th	1948	Thomas Brennan (FF)	James Everett (NLP)	Patrick Cogan (Ind.)	3 seats 1923–1981	
14th	1951	Thomas Brennan (FF)	James Everett (Lab)	Patrick Cogan (Ind.)	3 seats 1923–1981	
14th	1953 by-election	Mark Deering (FG)	James Everett (Lab)	Patrick Cogan (Ind.)	3 seats 1923–1981	
15th	1954	Mark Deering (FG)	James Everett (Lab)	Paudge Brennan (FF)	3 seats 1923–1981	
16th	1957	James O'Toole (FF)	James Everett (Lab)	Paudge Brennan (FF)	3 seats 1923–1981	
17th	1961	Michael O'Higgins (FG)	James Everett (Lab)	Paudge Brennan (FF)	3 seats 1923–1981	
18th	1965	Michael O'Higgins (FG)	James Everett (Lab)	Paudge Brennan (FF)	3 seats 1923–1981	
18th	1968 by-election	Michael O'Higgins (FG)	Godfrey Timmins (FG)	Paudge Brennan (FF)	3 seats 1923–1981	
19th	1969	Liam Kavanagh (Lab)	Godfrey Timmins (FG)	Paudge Brennan (FF)	3 seats 1923–1981	
20th	1973	Liam Kavanagh (Lab)	Godfrey Timmins (FG)	Ciarán Murphy (FF)	3 seats 1923–1981	
21st	1977	Liam Kavanagh (Lab)	Godfrey Timmins (FG)	Ciarán Murphy (FF)	3 seats 1923–1981	
22nd	1981	Liam Kavanagh (Lab)	Godfrey Timmins (FG)	Ciarán Murphy (FF)	Paudge Brennan (FF)	4 seats 1981–1992
23rd	1982 (Feb)	Liam Kavanagh (Lab)	Godfrey Timmins (FG)	Ciarán Murphy (FF)	Gemma Hussey (FG)	4 seats 1981–1992
24th	1982 (Nov)	Liam Kavanagh (Lab)	Godfrey Timmins (FG)	Paudge Brennan (FF)	Gemma Hussey (FG)	4 seats 1981–1992
25th	1987	Liam Kavanagh (Lab)	Joe Jacob (FF)	Dick Roche (FF)	Gemma Hussey (FG)	4 seats 1981–1992
26th	1989	Liam Kavanagh (Lab)	Joe Jacob (FF)	Dick Roche (FF)	Godfrey Timmins (FG)	4 seats 1981–1992
27th	1992	Liam Kavanagh (Lab)	Joe Jacob (FF)	Liz McManus (DL)	Godfrey Timmins (FG)	Johnny Fox (Ind.)
27th	1995 by-election	Liam Kavanagh (Lab)	Joe Jacob (FF)	Liz McManus (DL)	Godfrey Timmins (FG)	Mildred Fox (Ind.)
28th	1997	Dick Roche (FF)	Joe Jacob (FF)	Liz McManus (DL)	Billy Timmins (FG)	Mildred Fox (Ind.)
29th	2002	Dick Roche (FF)	Joe Jacob (FF)	Liz McManus (Lab)	Billy Timmins (FG)	Mildred Fox (Ind.)
30th	2007	Dick Roche (FF)	Joe Behan (FF)	Liz McManus (Lab)	Billy Timmins (FG)	Andrew Doyle (FG)
31st	2011	Simon Harris (FG)	Stephen Donnelly (Ind.)	Anne Ferris (Lab)	Billy Timmins (FG)	Andrew Doyle (FG)
32nd	2016	Simon Harris (FG)	Stephen Donnelly (SD)	John Brady (SF)	Pat Casey (FF)	Andrew Doyle (FG)
33rd	2020	Simon Harris (FG)	Stephen Donnelly (FF)	John Brady (SF)	Jennifer Whitmore (SD)	Steven Matthews (GP)
34th	2024	Simon Harris (FG)	Edward Timmins (FG)	John Brady (SF)	Jennifer Whitmore (SD)	4 seats since 2024
