= Irish passport =

Passport of citizens of the Republic of Ireland

Irish Passport Pas Éireannach
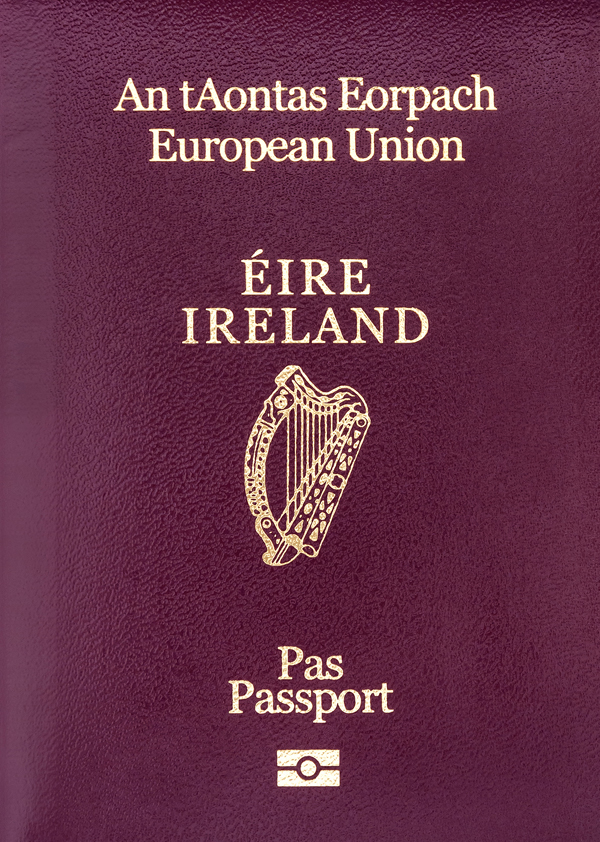
- The front cover of a contemporary Irish biometric passport booklet until June 2026 (with chip)
- Type: Passport
- Issued by: Department of Foreign Affairs and Trade of Ireland
- First issued: 3 April 1924 (first version); 1 January 1985 (first EU format); 1 October 2006 (first biometric passport); 26 June 2026 (current version); 26 June 2026 (passport card)
- Purpose: Identification
- Eligibility: Irish citizenship
- Expiration: Booklet: 10 years for adults, 5 years for children; Card: 5 years or validity of holder's passport booklet (whichever is shorter)
- Cost: Adult (18 or older): Standard 32 pages: €75; Large 66 pages: €105; Passport card: €35; Standard 32 page Passport + Passport card (online only bundle) : €100; Child: Standard 32 pages: €20; Passport card: €45

An Irish passport (Irish: pas Éireannach) is the passport issued to citizens of Ireland. An Irish passport enables the bearer to travel internationally and serves as evidence of Irish nationality and citizenship of the European Union. It also facilitates the access to consular assistance from both Irish embassies and any embassy from other European Union member states while abroad.

Irish passports are issued by the Passport Office, a division of the Department of Foreign Affairs and Trade. All Irish passports have been biometric since 2006. In 2015, the Irish government introduced the Passport Card, which enables Irish citizens who already possess a passport to travel throughout the European Economic Area (EEA) and Switzerland. An Irish Passport Card is intended for travel and identification purposes and functions similarly to an EEA national identity card.

Both Irish passports and Irish passport cards allow Irish citizens to travel, live, and work without restriction in any country within the EEA, Switzerland and the Common Travel Area. Irish citizens have visa-free or visa on arrival access to 193 countries and territories; the international access available to Irish citizens ranks third in the world according to the 2024 Visa Restrictions Index.

As of 2026, Irish citizens are the only nationality in the world with the automatic right to live and work in both the European Union and the United Kingdom.

== History ==
The Irish Free State was created in 1922 as a dominion of the British Commonwealth, modelled explicitly on the Dominion of Canada. At the time, dominion status was a limited form of independence and while the Free State Constitution referred to "citizens of the Irish Free State", the rights and obligations of such citizens were expressed to apply only "within the limits of the jurisdiction of the Irish Free State".

The Irish Free State first notified the UK Government that it proposed to issue its own passports in 1923. The Irish government initially proposed that the description they would give citizens in their passports would be "Citizen of the Irish Free State". According to a report from The Irish Times the first time that Irish passports were used was by the Irish delegation to the League of Nations in August 1923. The British Government objected to this. It insisted that the appropriate description was "British subject", because, inter alia, the Irish Free State was part of the British Commonwealth. The Irish government considered the British viewpoint. The Governor-General subsequently informed the British government that the description that would generally be used (with some exceptions) would be "Citizen of the Irish Free State and of the British Commonwealth of Nations". Without reaching agreement with the UK, the Irish government issued its first passports to the general public on 3 April 1924, using this description.

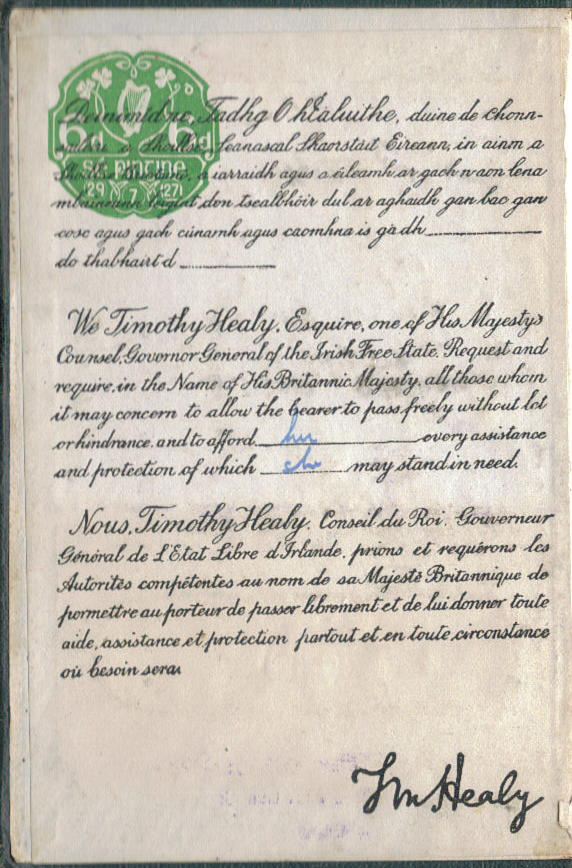
Statement on Irish Free State passport, 1927: We Timothy Healy, Esquire, one of His Majesty's Counsel, Governor-General of the Irish Free State, Request and require, in the Name of His Britannic Majesty, all those whom it may concern to allow the bearer to pass freely … etc.

The British Government was not satisfied with this compromise. It instructed its consular and passport officers everywhere that Irish Free State passports were not to be recognised if the holder was not described in the passport as a "British subject". This led to considerable practical difficulty for Irish Free State citizens abroad, with many having to obtain British passports in addition to their Irish Free State passports. The British consular officers would also confiscate the Irish Free State passports, a practice the Irish authorities regarded as "very humiliating".

The stalemate as regards Irish passports continued until January 1930 when the Irish authorities reluctantly accepted a compromise formula originally suggested by the Irish Minister for External Affairs, Desmond Fitzgerald, in 1926. The Irish authorities issued a circular letter to British consular and passport authorities agreeing that Irish passports would be changed so that they were issued by the Minister for External Affairs in the name of the king using the king's full title; would describe the bearer as "one of His Majesty's subjects of the Irish Free State"; and if passports were issued to persons other than subjects of His Majesty, that fact would be stated. This formula settled the thorny issue.

In 1939, two years after the adoption of the Constitution of 1937, which formally renamed the state "Ireland", the Irish government decided to make significant changes to the form of Irish passports. As a courtesy, the Irish authorities notified the British authorities. In a memorandum dated 1 March 1939 entitled "The Form of Eire Passports", the British Secretary of State for Dominion Affairs, Thomas W. H. Inskip, informed his government of developments which had recently taken place "regarding the form of passports issued by the Government of Eire".

In the memorandum, the Secretary of State reported that "hitherto [the passports] (which have not, I understand, been amended since 1936) have borne two indications of relationship to the British Commonwealth of Nations". These, the memorandum noted, were the reference to the king including his full title in the "request" page; and a front page, where underneath the words "Irish Free State" (in Irish, English and French) appear the words "British Commonwealth of Nations". The proposals notified by the Irish authorities included replacing the reference to "Irish Free State" with "Ireland"; amending the "request" page to drop reference to the king; and dropping the reference to the "British Commonwealth of Nations". The Secretary of State proposed that he reply to the Irish authorities in terms that "His Majesty's Government in the United Kingdom greatly regrets the proposed elimination of the king's name from Éire passports; that in their view, the omission, when it comes to be known, is bound to create a bad impression in the UK and to widen the separation which Mr de Valera deplores between Éire and Northern Ireland".

The Secretary of State noted in his memorandum that to "say more than this might raise questions [relating to whether or not Ireland was still in the Commonwealth] which it was the object of the statement of the 30th December 1937, to avoid". This was a reference to the communique published by Downing Street noting the adoption of the Irish Constitution, stating that in their view Ireland continued to be part of the Commonwealth and affirming the position of Northern Ireland as part of the United Kingdom.

Ultimately, the Irish proceeded with their plans including that the term "Citizen of the Irish Free State and of the British Commonwealth of Nations" would be replaced with "Citizen of Ireland". This has remained the description up to present time, with current Irish passports describing the holder as a "citizen of Ireland" on the request page and giving the holder's nationality as "Éireannach/Irish" on the information page.

The evolution of the physical description of the passport utilised by Irish citizens from 3 April 1924 to 1 January 1985 (when the new European passports were introduced) was one of change. Prior to the first usage of an Irish passport in 1924, Irish citizens were issued with a 32-page British Passport, which had a navy blue hardcover with an embossed British coat of arms. Above the coat of arms the identifier "British Passport" was printed, while below the coat of arms the inscription "The United Kingdom of Great Britain and Ireland" was printed. It also contained two cut-outs in the cover, which allowed the bearer's name and the passport number to be displayed. The first Irish passport, issued to the general public from 3 April 1924, contained a green hardcover with the Irish coat of arms, the harp, embossed in the centre. The passport was bilingual in Irish and English whereby, encircling the harp was the national inscription of Saorstát Éireann and "Irish Free State", while above the coat of arms the identifier "Pas" and "Passport" was printed. It also contained a cut-out for the bearer's name.

Following the enactment of the Irish constitution, the physical appearance of the Irish passport changed again. While it retained the green colour and the embossed harp at the centre, the number of languages on the cover changed to three, with French joining Irish and English. To the left of the harp, the national inscription "Éire", "Ireland", and "Irlande" was printed in a row, while to the right of the harp, the identifier "Pas", "Passport", and "Passeport" was printed. The 1970s saw a slight change to the document: while the national inscription was made bigger in the three languages, and moved to the top right corner, the identifier "passport" was also enlarged, and moved to the bottom left corner of the cover. On 23 June 1981, during the council meeting of the member states of the European Communities (now the European Union), a resolution was agreed to make all member state passports more uniform. This change, which included changing the colour of all member states passports to burgundy was to see the first European passports from 1 January 1985. However, only three member states (Denmark, Ireland, and Italy) had implemented this change on the specified date, with all other member states complying later. Irish citizens in possession of the old green Irish passports could still make use of their passports until they expired.

=== "Sale" of passports in 1988–1998 ===
A 1988 scheme was designed to draw foreign investment into Ireland, described in a 1998 Seanad debate as the "Passports for investment scheme" Each had to invest $1,000,000 and live in Ireland for varying periods. The scheme was scrapped in 1998. Before long it was being described as the "sale" of passports in the media, but only 143 passports were passed on under the scheme. Notable applicants included some of the Getty family, Sheikh Khalid bin Mahfouz and Khalid Sabih Masri. Masri had lent IR£1,100,000 to the pet food company of Taoiseach Albert Reynolds.

Another was Norman Turner from Manchester, whose proposed investment was to build a casino in Dublin's Phoenix Park. Turner had entertained Bertie Ahern and had paid £10,000 in cash to his party, and received his passport later in 1994. The matter was revealed during the Mahon Tribunal hearings in 2008; Mr Ahern commented that Mr Turner had an Irish mother, and that in 2007 some 7,000 other passport applications were assisted in some way by politicians.

The 2006 Moriarty Tribunal report covered the grant of passports to a Mr Fustok and some of his friends. Mr Fustok had previously bought a yearling horse from Taoiseach Charles Haughey for IR£50,000. The tribunal considered that "The explanation advanced for the payment, namely that it was in consideration for the purchase of a yearling, is highly unconvincing and improbable".

Passport-granting officials have also sold passports illegally, notably Kevin McDonald while working in London, who had sold "hundreds" of passports to criminals for up to £15,000 each in the 1980s, grossing $400,000. McDonald was prosecuted in 1989 and was sentenced to 21 months in jail.

=== Increased demand following Brexit ===
After the UK's Brexit referendum on 23 June 2016, tens of thousands of Britons as well as many residents in Northern Ireland, applied for an Irish Passport.

Senator Neale Richmond, chairman of the Brexit Committee in the Seanad, described in October 2018 the fast growth in the number of Irish passport applications received from the United Kingdom since the Brexit vote. There were 46,229 applications in 2015, the year before the referendum, "consistent with the annual average up to then". In 2016, the year of the Brexit vote, 63,453 applications were received, and there were 80,752 applications in 2017. In first half of 2018, the number was already at 44,962 applications. Richmond stated that "Embassy officials predict that based on this, 2018 will be the busiest year so far for Irish passport applications in the UK".

98,544 applications for Irish passports were received from Great Britain in 2018, an increase of 22% on the previous year. The number of applications from Northern Ireland increased by 2% to 84,855.

== Eligibility ==
In 1978 the High Court ruled that among the unenumerated rights of citizens implicit in Article 40.3 of the Constitution are the right to travel outside the state and by extension the right to a passport. However, the state may limit this right for purposes of national security, and courts also have the power to confiscate passports of criminal defendants. Citizenship is defined by Irish nationality law; non citizens cannot have passports. Adult passport booklets are generally valid for 10 years and child passport booklets valid for 5 years. The validity of passport booklets can be limited by the Passport Office for certain individuals, especially those who have lost two or more passports. Passport cards are valid for 5 years or the validity of the corresponding passport booklet, whichever is the lesser period.

=== Northern Ireland ===
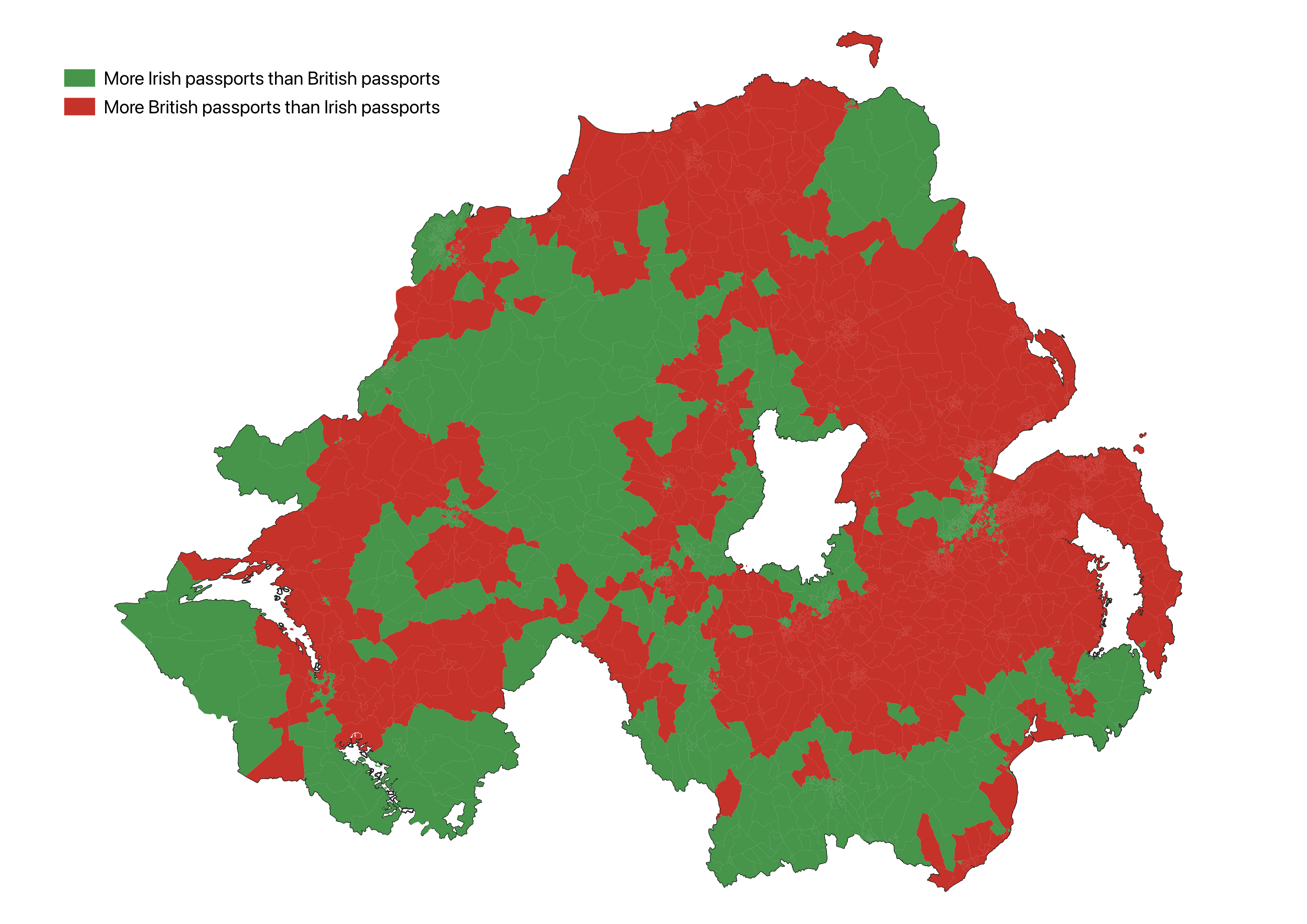
Map of the most commonly held passport according to the 2021 census. Red is British and green is Irish.

Irish nationality law does not distinguish between Northern Ireland and the rest of the island of Ireland. This means that those in Northern Ireland, are entitled to Irish citizenship, but unless claimed it remains an entitlement. People born in Northern Ireland are automatically British citizens if their parents are British citizens or settled in the UK.

Anyone born on the island of Ireland (including Northern Ireland), before 1 January 2005, is entitled to Irish citizenship.

In the 2011 census, 1,070,413 British and 375,826 Irish passports were held. In the 2021 census, this was 1,000,207 British and 614,251 Irish passports. Under Irish law the use of a passport of another jurisdiction does not affect Irish citizenship.

A person born on or after 1 January 2005 on the island of Ireland is entitled to Irish citizenship if either or both parents were either Irish or British citizen(s), or entitled to live in Ireland or Northern Ireland without any time limit to their residency, or were legally resident in the island of Ireland for at least 3 out of the 4 years immediately before birth.

== Format ==
Irish passport booklets use the standard European Union design, with a machine-readable identity page and 32 or 66 visa pages for the larger version.

=== Cover ===
The cover bears the twelve-stringed harp, the national symbol of Ireland. The words on the cover are in both of Ireland's official languages, Irish and English. The top of the cover page reads An tAontas Eorpach and the equivalent in English, European Union. Just above the harp are the words Éire and its equivalent in English, Ireland.

=== Identity page ===
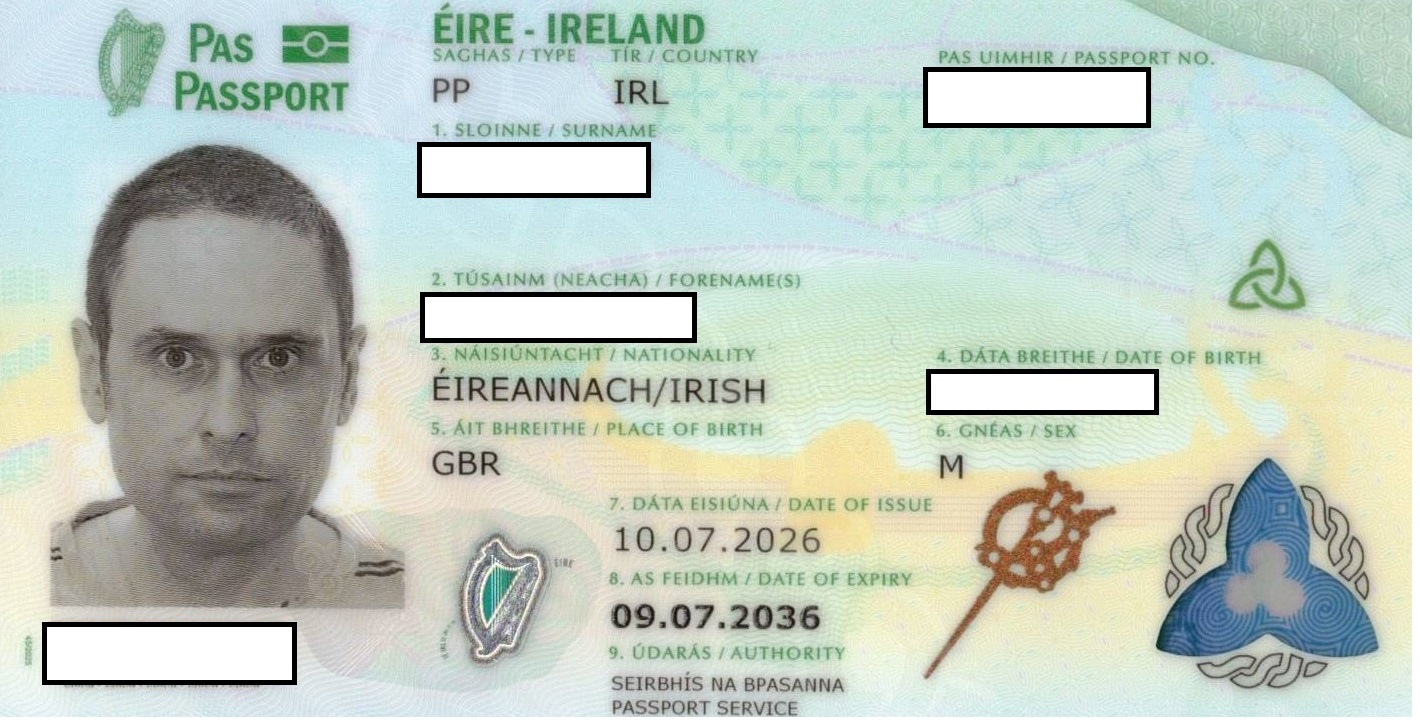
The biodata page of a contemporary Irish passport since June 2026

The identity page on older Irish passport booklets was on the back cover of the booklet. Newly issued passport booklets have been redesigned with additional security features. The identity page is now a plastic card attached between the front cover and the first paper page (the "Observations" page).

The ePassport or biometric passport, was launched on 16 October 2006 with the first ePassports presented that day by the minister for foreign affairs.

- Photo of passport holder, printed in greyscale.
- Type (PP)
- Country (IRL)
- Passport number
- 1. Surname
- 2. Forename(s)
- 3. Nationality (Éireannach/Irish)
- 4. Date of Birth
- 5. Sex
- 6. Place of birth (county of birth if born on the island of Ireland (all 32 counties), 3 letter country code of country of birth if born elsewhere.)
- 7. Date of issue
- 8. Date of expiry
- 9. Authority
- 10. Signature

The information page ends with the machine readable zone starting with PPIRL.

=== Request page ===
Irish passport booklets contain a note on the inside cover which states:

In Irish:

Iarrann Aire Gnóthaí Eachtracha agus Trádála na hÉireann ar gach n-aon lena mbaineann ligean dá shealbhóir seo, saoránach d'Éirinn, gabháil ar aghaidh gan bhac gan chosc agus gach cúnamh agus caomhnú is gá a thabhairt don sealbhóir.

In English:

The Minister for Foreign Affairs and Trade of Ireland requests all whom it may concern to allow the bearer, a citizen of Ireland, to pass freely and without hindrance and to afford the bearer all necessary assistance and protection.

Formerly, the request was also made in French, but this was discontinued as newer versions of the passport were introduced.

==== Languages ====
The data page/information page of the 2026 model is printed in Irish and English, being the first not to feature French. Each detail includes a reference number (e.g. "1 SLOINNE/SURNAME"). This reference number can be used to look up translations into any other EU language, as all EU passports share a standard text layout.

== Security features ==
The latest Irish passport booklets have security features designed to make them difficult to forge or be mistaken as forgeries. They have also been optimised for machine reading.

The identity page of the passport booklet has been moved to the front of the passport and is now printed on a plastic card. This allows easier machine reading of the passport, as the official has to spend less time finding the identity page in the passport. The top-right corner of the passport booklet contains the biometric chip, which contains a copy of the information contained on the identity page, and a facial scan of the holder. To prevent unauthorised parties remotely accessing the information stored in the RFID biometric chip, the machine readable zone of the identity page must be scanned to unlock it. This safeguard is known as Basic Access Control.

The title of the identity page "Éire/Ireland/Irlande" "Pas/Passport/Passeport" is printed in colour-changing ink, which varies from light green to gold-red, depending on the angle of the light shining on it. The background of the identity page is a complex celtic design, with the words "Éire Ireland" occasionally woven into the design.

The identity picture is now greyscale, and is digitally printed onto the surface of the page, rather than the actual photos sent by the applicant being pasted onto the page. The Irish harp is superimposed as a hologram onto the bottom right corner of the photograph. The words "Éire Ireland" are embossed several times into either side of the identity page. This embossing partially covers the photograph as an added security measure. A likeness of the photograph of the applicant is pin-punched into the surface of the identity page, and can be viewed when the identity page is held to light.

Under UV light, fluorescing fibres are visible on every page except the data page. The first sentence of Article 2 of the Irish constitution is visible under UV light and is printed in both Irish and English on alternate pages. The 2013 version of the passport also reveal a topographical map of Ireland on the observations page. Later pages include such landmarks as the Cliffs of Moher, the Samuel Beckett Bridge and the Aviva Stadium; there are excerpts from poems in Irish (by Nuala Ni Dhomhnaill), English (by William Butler Yeats) and Ulster Scots (by James Orr) and from the score of the national anthem, Amhrán na bhFiann (Irish for 'The Soldiers Song').

On June 26 2026, Minister for Foreign Affairs Helen McEntee unveiled the new design for the Irish passport featuring native flora and fauna including the Irish Wolfhound.

== Foreign travel ==
=== Visa requirements map ===
Visa requirements for Irish citizens Ireland Freedom of movement (European Union / EEA / Switzerland / Common Travel Area) Visa not required / ESTA / eTA / eVisitor eVisa Visa available both on arrival or online Visa on arrival Visa required prior to arrival

As of 5 June 2024, Irish citizens had visa-free or visa on arrival access to 193 countries and territories, ranking the Irish passport 2nd worldwide (tied with the Austrian, Finnish, Luxembourg, Dutch, South Korean, and Swedish passports) according to the Henley Passport Index.

=== Misuse ===
Irish passports whether legitimate or counterfeits have been used by intelligence agencies around the world to engage in espionage in either Ireland or abroad, taking advantage of Ireland's policy of neutrality, and the unassuming nature of Irish nationals.

- Oliver North, a United States Marine Corps Lieutenant Colonel and a central figure in the Iran-Contra scandal, carried a false Irish passport (in the name "John Clancy") while visiting Iran in 1986, as did his fellow covert operatives. This was part of a series of events that became known as the Iran–Contra affair.
- In December 2005, Ireland's Minister for Justice Michael McDowell accused journalist Frank Connolly of having travelled to Colombia in 2001 on a falsely obtained Irish passport in connection with the group known as the Colombia Three. Connolly, who worked at the Centre for Public Inquiry, (intended as a public watch-dog organisation), vigorously denied the allegation and in turn accused the Minister of abusing his position.
- On 19 January 2010, Mahmoud al-Mabhouh, a senior Hamas military commander, was assassinated in Dubai by a team involving at least 11 Israeli Mossad agents, three of whom were initially reported as using counterfeit Irish passports. The number of forged Irish passports used in the killing was later revised upwards to eight following a Garda and Department of Foreign Affairs investigation. The Irish government responded by expelling a staff member of the Israeli Embassy in Dublin. It stated that it considered "an Israeli government agency was responsible for the misuse and, most likely, the manufacture of the forged Irish passports associated with the murder of Mr. Mabhouh."
- In June 2010 it was alleged that one of ten covert sleeper agents of the Russian government under non-official cover in the United States as part of the "Illegals Program" used a forged Irish passport issued in the name of "Eunan Gerard Doherty" to "Richard Murphy." The Russian embassy in Dublin reportedly declined to comment on the allegations that its officials had used a counterfeit Irish passport. "Richard Murphy," who later identified himself as Russian national Vladimir Guryev, was repatriated to Russia, along with the other nine members of the Illegals Program, as part of a prisoner exchange. It later emerged that the passports of up to six Irish citizens may have been compromised by the Russian agents. This led to the expulsion of a Dublin-based Russian diplomat in February 2011.

== Gallery of historic images ==
An Irish passport issued in 2004, 2 years prior to the introduction of biometric passports

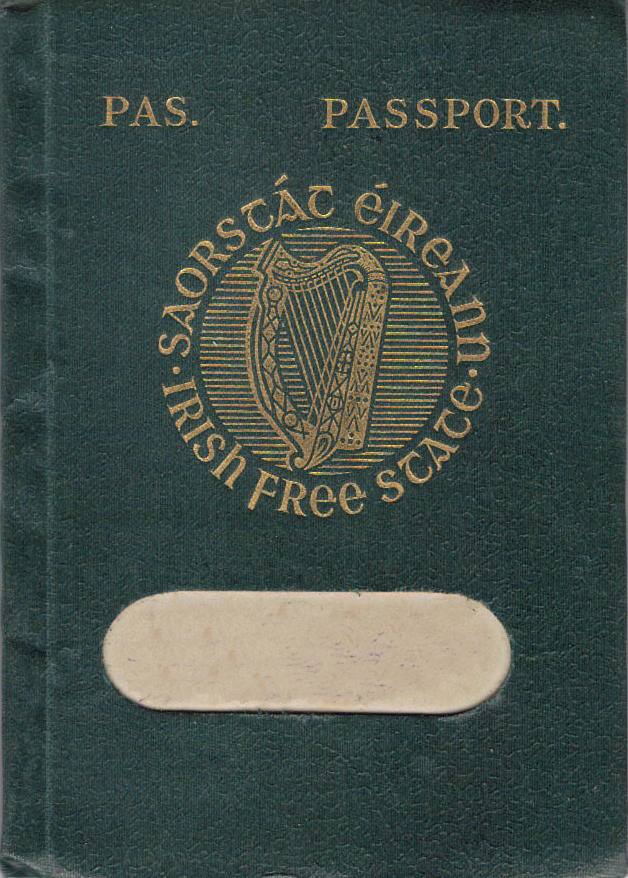
Irish Free State passport cover as issued 1927 (holder's name removed) ...

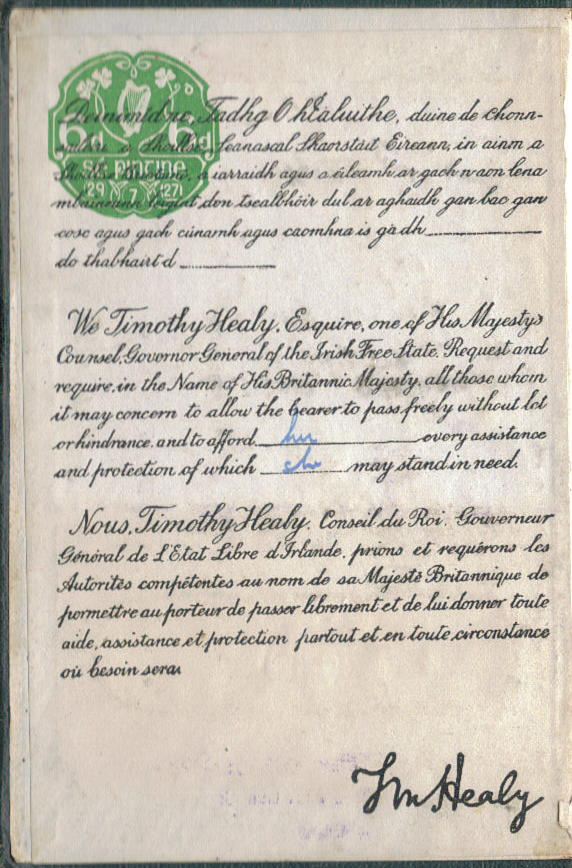
... and its associated 'Request' page

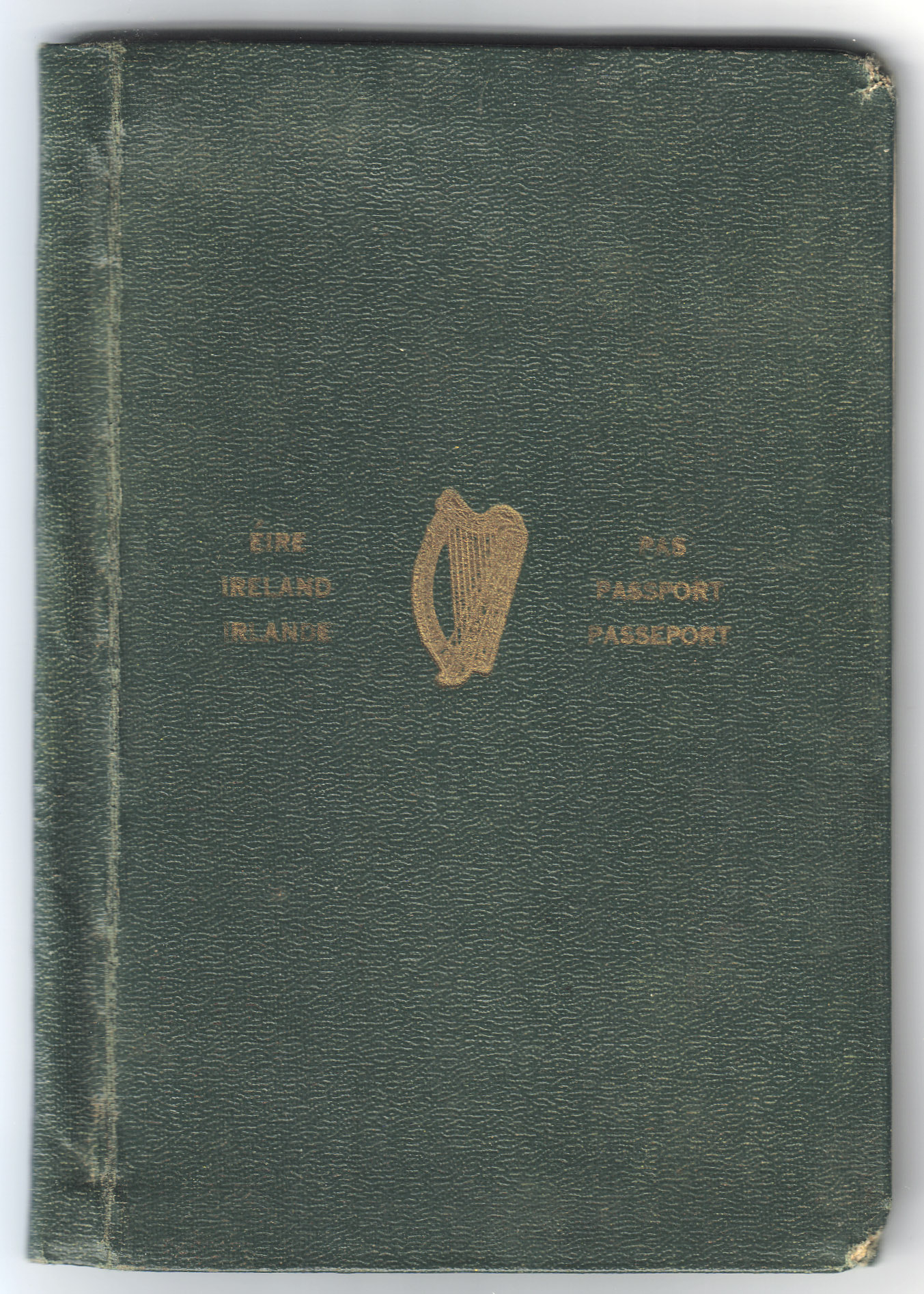
Passport from 1950

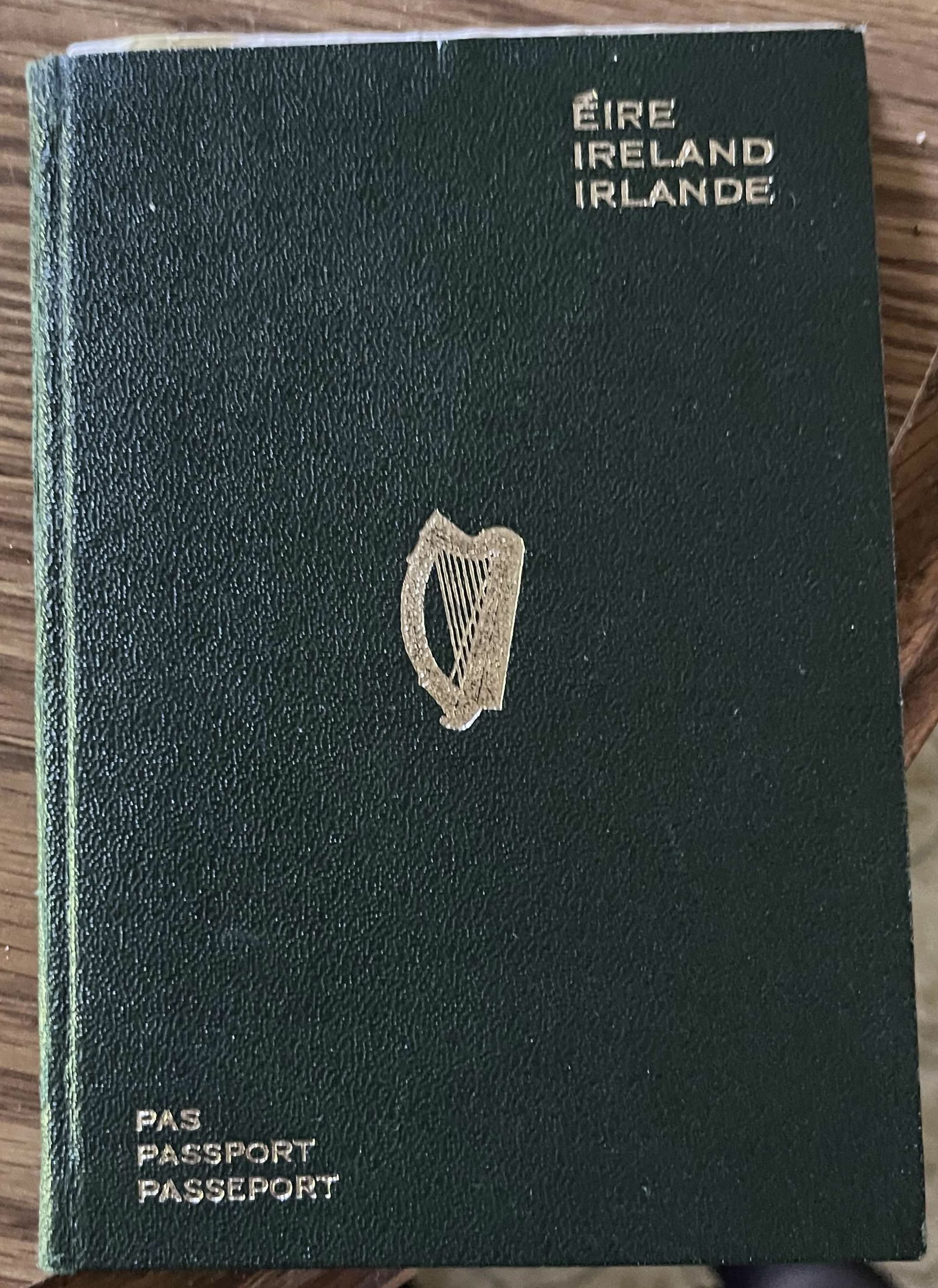
Passport issued in 1952 ...

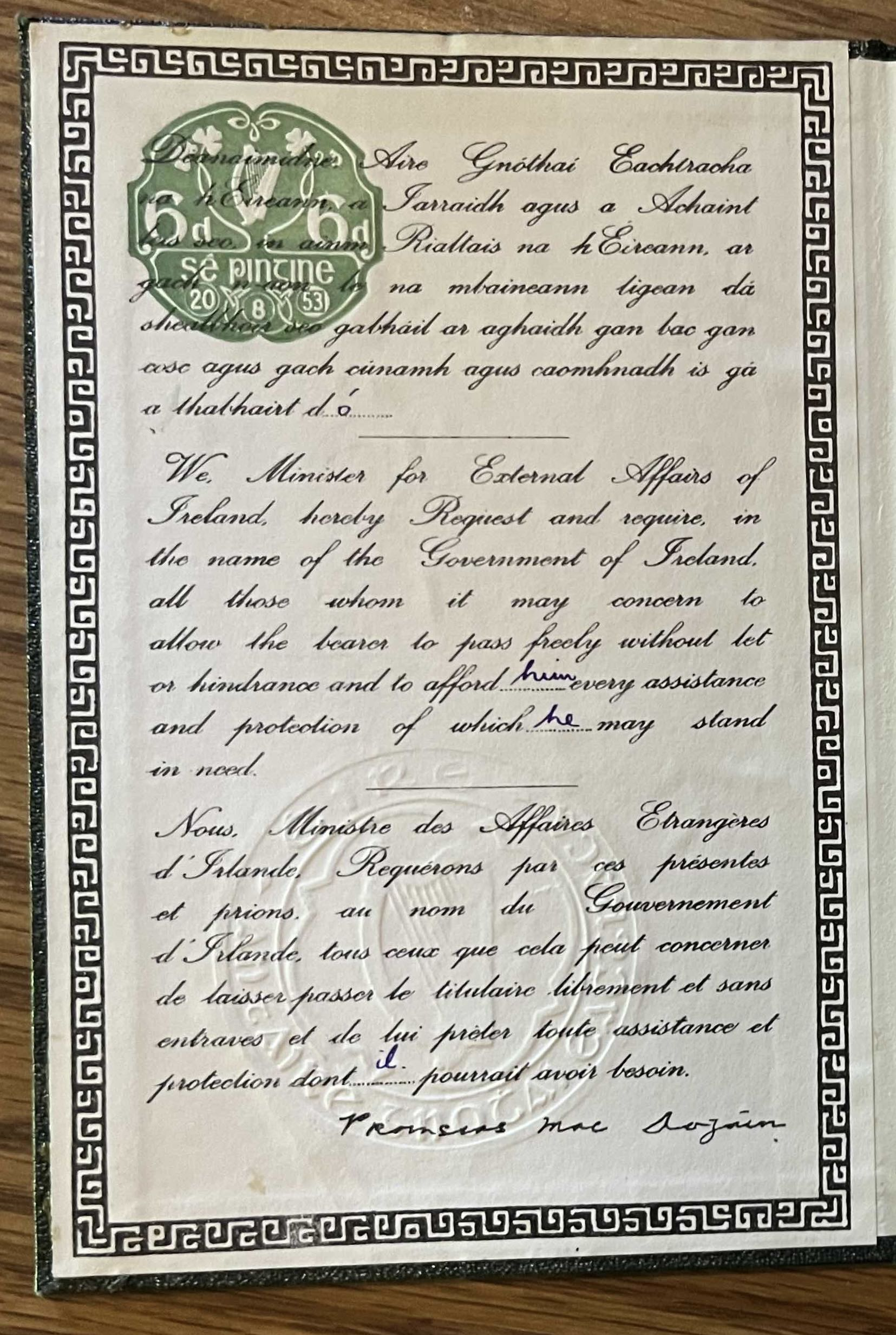
... and its associated 'Request' page

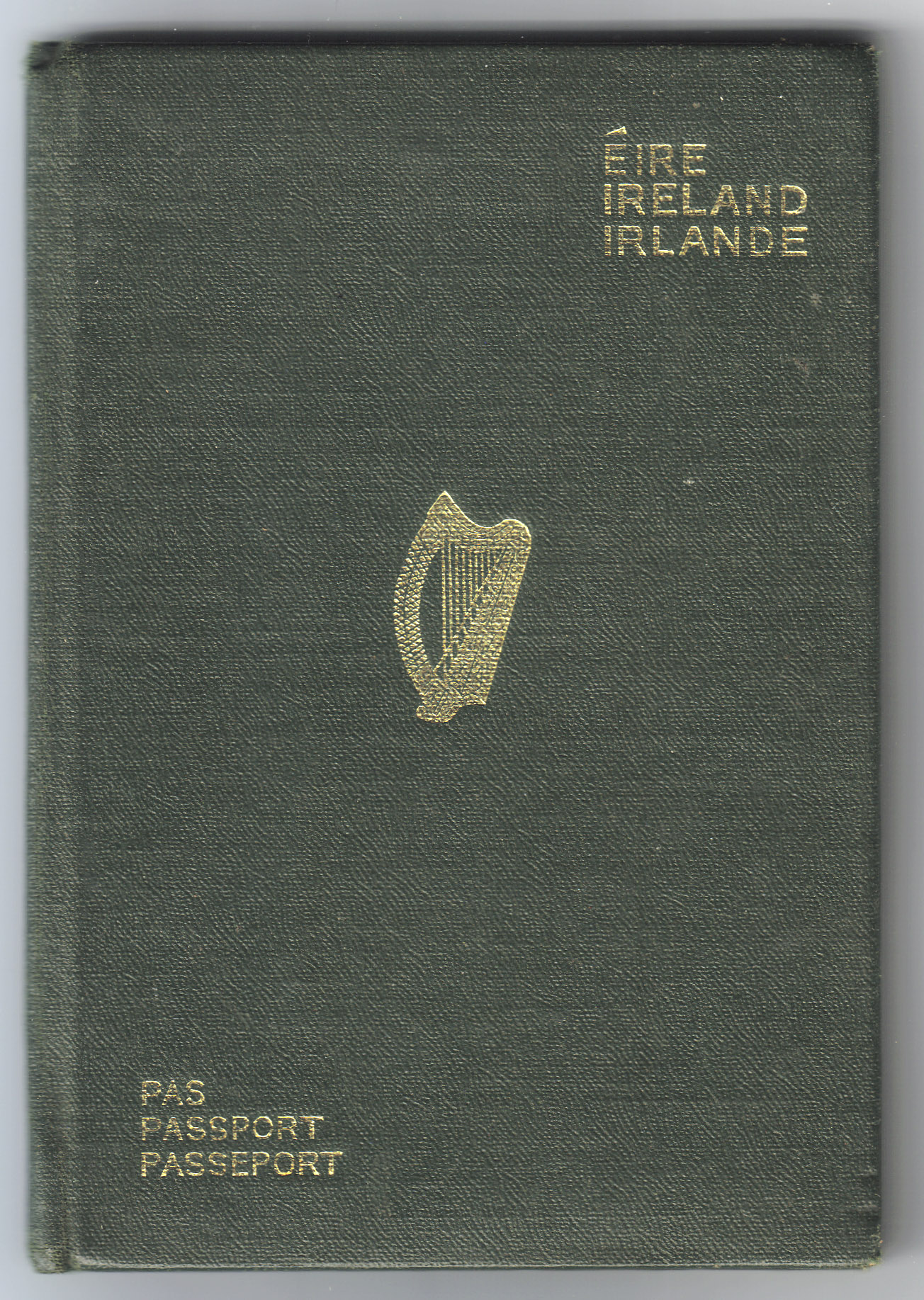
Passport from 1978

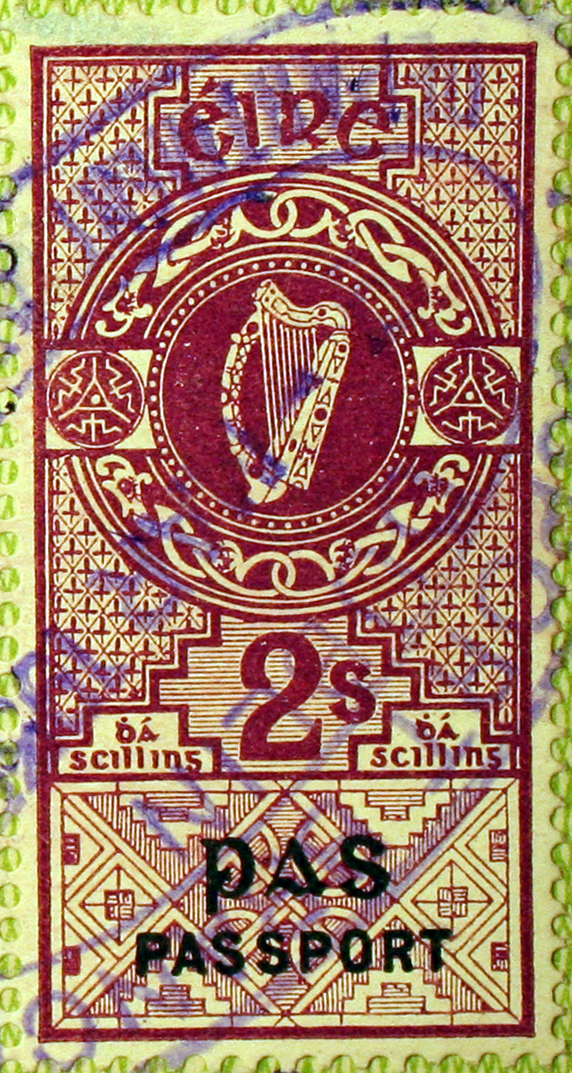
Two shilling passport revenue stamp, 1939

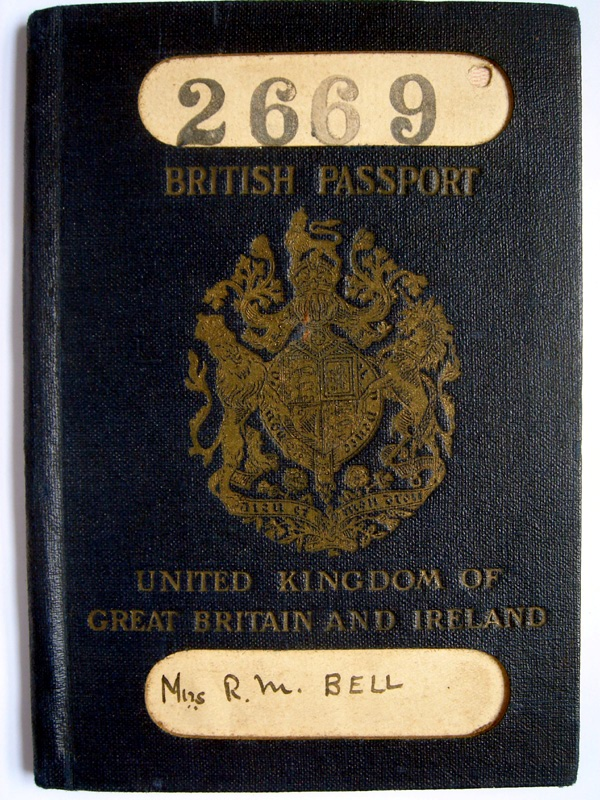
Prior to Irish independence, British passports were used.

== See also ==
- Driving licence in the Republic of Ireland
- Irish nationality law
- Passports of the European Union
- Visa requirements for Irish citizens
