= Kiberd =

Kiberd is a surname. Notable people with the surname include:

- Damien Kiberd (fl. 1989), Irish journalist and commentator
- Declan Kiberd (born 1951), Irish writer and scholar
- James Kiberd (born 1949), American actor
