= Libertarian anarchism =

Libertarian anarchism may refer to:

- Anarchism, a political philosophy that advocates for a society without a state or hierarchy
- Autarchism, a political philosophy that upholds the principle of individual liberty, rejects compulsory government and supports its elimination in favor of "ruling oneself and no other"
- Free-market anarchism a branch of anarchism that believes in a free-market economic system based on voluntary interactions without the involvement of the state; a form of individualist anarchism, market socialism, and libertarian socialism
  - Agorism, a revolutionary form of free-market anarchism that focuses on employing counter-economic activity to undermine the state
  - Mutualism, an economic theory advocates a socialist society based on free markets and usufructs, i.e. occupation and use property norms
- Libertarianism, an individualist political philosophy that upholds liberty as its primary focus and principal objective. It originated as a form of left-wing politics, however in the mid-20th century, right-libertarian proponents of anarcho-capitalism and minarchism co-opted the term to advocate laissez-faire capitalism.
  - Anarcho-capitalism, a form of right-libertarianism that advocates the elimination of states in favor of a system of private property enforced by private agencies
- Voluntaryism, a political philosophy which holds that all forms of human association should be voluntary

== See also ==
- Libertarian Anarchy: Against the State, a book by Gerard Casey that promotes anarcho-capitalism
