= Cóir =

- Type: Civil society
- Purpose: Irish republicanism, Right-wing populism, Social conservatism, Euroscepticism
- Headquarters: Dublin, Ireland
- Spokesperson: Richard Greene

Cóir (pronounced [koːɾʲ]; Irish for "justice") was a social Catholic, conservative Eurosceptic lobby group established to campaign against the Treaty of Lisbon which was approved by referendum in Ireland on 2 October 2009. The group claimed to have had approximately 2,600 campaign volunteers for the 6 months prior to the referendum.

According to spokesman Brian Hickey, members of Cóir had considered registering it as a political party. In 2009, Hickey said he believed there was room for a "patriotic, conservative and socially conscious party" to fill the "gap there in the Irish political spectrum".

== Political and religious standpoint ==
It claimed to be an independent group with members coming from different political backgrounds. It was generally more conservative than other Lisbon No vote campaigns, and included a number of individuals involved in social conservative issues.

Coir's ideology could be described as a blend of traditional Catholicism and Irish republicanism. It was however centre-left economically. In addition, it supported restrictions on immigration during times of economic decline.

Former member of the Fianna Fáil party and former Dún Laoghaire–Rathdown Green Party Councillor, member of Muintir na hÉireann Richard Greene acted as spokesperson in the media. Other figures who have represented Cóir include Niamh Uí Bhriain and Peter Murphy.

== No to Lisbon Treaty campaign ==
Cóir advertised in the national and local media, notably in newspapers such as Alive!, Irish Family Press and also submitted letters on the subject to these publications. Its spokespersons also had several opinion pieces in newspapers such as Irish Times, and appeared on local and national radio and TV.

It has campaigned against the second referendum on the Lisbon Treaty. Greene, Uí Bhrian and Murphy, addressed the Sub-Committee on Ireland's Future in the European of the Joint Oireachtas Committee on European Affairs in a heated debate. Greene accused the committee of treason for not upholding the vote on the treaty.

== Criticism ==
In 2008, the leader of Fianna Fáil Micheál Martin alleged that the group was a "front organisation" of the anti-abortion group Youth Defence. The organisation operates from the same building on Capel Street in Dublin as Youth Defence and the Pro-Life Alliance. Some members of religious organisations also criticised the organisation's stance on the Lisbon Treaty.
