= Sam Smyth =

Investigative reporter, columnist and broadcaster

Sam Smyth is an investigative reporter, columnist and broadcaster. He works for the Irish Mail on Sunday and formerly worked for the Irish Independent, Sunday Independent, and Sunday Tribune newspapers.

He is the only Irish journalist to twice win journalist of the year honours: in 1991 for his investigation into business scandals, and in 1997 for his exposure of a political scandal that led to the resignation of government minister Michael Lowry. Smyth revealed that multimillionaire businessman Ben Dunne financed an extension to the home of the Transport, Energy and Communications minister. The minister resigned 36 hours after the story broke. He wrote a book, Thanks a Million Big Fella, based on this story.

In addition to his journalism awards, Smyth was voted the "Journalists' Journalist" in a February 1997 poll of more than 250 Irish newspaper reporters, organised by In Dublin magazine.

== Personal life ==
He was born in Belfast, Northern Ireland, and was raised as a Methodist.

== Career ==
In the late 1960s, Smyth was a club promoter and band manager, sometimes known as Lord Turk. He had adopted this name in his role as manager of Romano's Ballroom. He got into journalism through writing for the Spotlight music magazine after he moved to Dublin. He worked with the Sunday World in Dublin in the 1970s. He deputised for Vincent Browne on the current affairs show.

In his book Thanks a Million Big Fella, Smyth wrote about the story he uncovered regarding multimillionaire Ben Dunne, head of Ireland's richest family, who financed an extension to the home of minister Michael Lowry in the governing Fine Gael party. Thirty-six hours after the story broke, the minister resigned. A subsequent government investigation into the affair discovered that Dunne had also given IR£1.3 million (€1,650,660) to the former Taoiseach, Charles Haughey, over the years.

He has stated that he is interested in how figures in authority use and abuse their patronage and power. He believes that a reporter's trustworthiness and reputation for integrity is his or her greatest asset.

== Controversies ==
=== Michael McDowell and Centre for Public Inquiry leak ===
On 13 December 2005, using Dáil privilege, Michael McDowell claimed that Frank Connolly, a journalist and a brother of one of the "Colombia Three", had travelled to Colombia using a false passport. McDowell subsequently leaked the alleged faked passport application to a friend, the journalist Sam Smyth of the Irish Independent. McDowell was widely accused of abusing his power as Minister for Justice for political purposes, and prejudicing any potential police investigation. Although Connolly denied McDowell's accusations, the controversy led to Irish American private donor Chuck Feeney withdrawing funding from the Centre for Public Inquiry, an investigative organisation which had published two reports embarrassing the government, of which Frank Connolly was the director, after McDowell met with him.

=== Lowry v. Sam Smyth ===
In 2010, Lowry launched a defamation lawsuit against Irish Independent journalist Sam Smyth, over an article Smyth had written regarding the Moriarty Tribunal, as well as comments Smyth had made on a TV3 show describing Lowry as having been "caught with his hand in the till." Smyth defended the defamation claim, stating he "did not call Michael Lowry TD a thief, but did believe he was a liar and a tax cheat". Lowry's defamation lawsuit was thrown out in the Circuit court, and again on appeal to the High Court. High Court Justice Nicholas Kearns noted that Lowry "did not dispute that he engaged in tax fraud", and ordered Lowry to pay Smyth's legal costs.

=== Dispute with Denis O'Brien ===
==== Today FM ====
On 15 October 2011, Today FM confirmed Sam Smyth's Sunday radio show was being dropped. He had been presenting it for 14 years. Smyth had previously offended his bosses by commenting in a newspaper and on television about the Moriarty Tribunal which criticised Today FM owner Denis O'Brien. Smyth said on air the next morning that he had been told not to talk about the end of his show and stopped one of his guests from talking about it too "before someone comes downstairs and pulls a wire we better move onto something else." The National Union of Journalists (NUJ) said it was concerned at the development. The Irish Independent, of which Denis O'Brien is a leading shareholder, reported that Anton Savage was being lined up to replace Sam Smyth. Eamon Dunphy subsequently resigned from Today FM's sister station Newstalk, in solidarity with Smyth and because, he said, the radio station's management wanted "dissenting voices" such as Constantin Gurdgiev off the airwaves.Senator lashes lack of media solidarity for Sam Smyth O'Brien 'not fit to control INM' - Irish Times columnist

==== Irish Independent ====
Browne later wrote a piece for The Irish Times on why O'Brien "is not a fit person to control INM [Independent News & Media]". In it he questioned O'Brien's previous threats to personally sue Sam Smyth and asked "[H]ow plausible is it that the removal of Sam Smyth from a Sunday morning radio programme on Today FM, which Denis O'Brien controls, and his ostracisation now within the Irish Independent to which he is contracted (not one article by him has been published for some months), isn't part of the same campaign which Denis O'Brien and [one of his then representatives on the board of INM] Leslie Buckley, conducted against Sam Smyth in 2010?"

== Works ==
- Riverdance: The Story 1996 ISBN 0-23399-058-5
- Thanks a Million Big Fella 1997 ISBN 0-86121-952-X
- Absurdly Yours – The Michael Nugent Letters, (with Michael Nugent) 2004 ISBN 1-84131-671-7
