= Christian Centrist Party =

Defunct Irish political party

- Chairman: Matt Ascough
- Founded: 1991
- Dissolved: 1994
- Ideology: Social conservatism

The Christian Centrist Party was a short-lived conservative Christian political party in Ireland. It stood, and endorsed, a number of candidates at the 1991 local elections, using the name Christian Principles Party, and at the 1992 general election.

The party changed its name in 1994 to the Christian Solidarity Party.

Candidates included party members Eamonn Murphy, who stood in Dublin South-Central, Patrick Doherty in Donegal North-East, Joe MacDonough in Dublin North-West, Gerry Duffy in Cork North-Central, and endorsing independent councillor Richard Greene in Dublin South.

The official Christian Centrist Party candidates polled only 3,443 first-preference votes 0.2% of the overall vote at the 1992 general election, and the party faded away. A number of its members and candidates would move on, and be active as independents in other minor conservative parties, such as Muintir na hÉireann and the Christian Solidarity Party. The party name was used in a 1998 submission to a Dáíl working group supporting a ban on abortion.
