= Declan Kiberd =

Irish writer and scholar

Declan Kiberd (born 24 May 1951) is an Irish writer and scholar with an interest in modern Irish literature, both in the English and Irish languages, which he often approaches through the lens of postcolonial theory. He is also interested in the academic study of children's literature. He serves on the advisory board of the International Review of Irish Culture (which describes itself as influenced by the critical theory developed by the Frankfurt School) and is a professor at the University of Notre Dame and at its campus in Dublin. In recent years and with publications such as After Ireland (2018), Kiberd has become a commentator on contemporary Irish social and political issues, particularly as such issues have been examined by Ireland's writers.

His niece Evanna Lynch is an actress known for her role as Luna Lovegood in the Harry Potter films.

In 2019 Kiberd was elected to the American Academy of Arts and Sciences.

== Early life and education ==
Kiberd was born in Dublin. His brother Damien is a journalist. Kiberd attended Belgrove Primary School in Clontarf, where he was taught by the novelist John McGahern, before moving to St Paul's College in Raheny. In 1969, he won an award to study Irish and English at Trinity College Dublin, where he was elected a Scholar and got a double first and a Gold Medal. He then went to Linacre College, Oxford, where he took a DPhil under the Joycean biographer Richard Ellmann.

== Academic career ==
Eleven years after its foundation, Kiberd taught English at University of Kent in Canterbury (1976–77). He then taught Irish in Trinity College Dublin for two years (1977–79).

Kiberd joined University College Dublin (UCD) in 1979 and remained on its staff until 2011. He was UCD lecturer in Anglo-Irish literature from 1979, appointed chair of Anglo-Irish literature and drama in 1997 and held this until 2011, at which time he moved to the U.S.

In 2011 Kiberd became the Donald and Marilyn Keough Professor of Irish Studies and an English professor at the University of Notre Dame.

== Research interests and supervision ==
His research interests are primarily Anglo-Irish Literature and Drama (in particular Joyce and Synge), postcolonial theory and children's literature; the latter he was responsible for introducing to the UCD curriculum in 2008.

He was close to the Palestinian-born Edward Said, who wrote Orientalism, considered an influential contribution to postcolonial theory. Since 2016, he has been at work on a short monograph about Beckett.

== Other work ==
Kiberd has been a columnist with The Irish Times (1985–87) and The Irish Press (1987–93), presenter of the RTÉ arts programme, Exhibit A (1984–86), and a regular essayist and reviewer in The Times Literary Supplement and The New York Times. He occasionally writes short pieces about culture for The Irish Times. He has contributed approximately 5,000 words to the London Review of Books over two pieces published in 2000 and 2001, the latter on a William Trevor short story collection and the former on a book by his UCD colleague Angela Bourke.

Kiberd serves on the advisory board of the International Review of Irish Culture, which describes itself as influenced by the critical theory developed by the neo-Marxist intellectuals of the Frankfurt School.

In addition, he has the following credits:

- Visiting Lecturer in more than 30 countries (1982–present)
- Director of the Yeats International Summer School (1985–87)
- Patron of the Dublin Shaw Society (1995–2000)
- Member of the Irish Manuscripts Commission and Cultural Relations Committee (1995–2002)
- Chair of the Public Libraries and Arts Government Commission (1996–99)
- President's Award (1998–99)
- Member of the Forum on Future of Broadcasting (2002)
- Elected member of the Royal Irish Academy (2003)
- Government of Ireland Senior Research Fellowship (2003–04)
- Appointed to the new board of the Abbey Theatre

== Publications ==
In 1987, Kiberd co-edited Omnium Gatherum: Essays for Richard Ellmann, which had been intended as a Festschrift for Richard Ellmann, but became a memoria when Ellmann died the same year.

Another publication of note is Irish Classics, which was awarded the Truman Capote Award for Literary Criticism in 2002.

He wrote the introduction to the Penguin Classics "Annotated Student's Edition" of Ulysses, which re-released the Bodley Head/Random House text of 1960–61.

In 2009, Faber and Faber published Ulysses and Us: The Art of Everyday Living. It argues that Ulysses is a work of popular fiction, always intended for a mass readership, and examines how Joyce's modernist masterpiece reflects and satirises aspects of daily life.

In 2015, Abbey Theatre Press published Handbook of the Irish Revival: An Anthology of Irish Cultural and Political Writings 1891-1922, which Kiberd co-edited P. J. Matthews. Irish President Michael D. Higgins gave a speech on the anthology.

Books:

- Synge and the Irish Language, Macmillan: London 1979; second edition with new Introduction, London 1992.
- Men and Feminism in Modern Literature, Macmillan: London 1985; second edition 1987.
- Idir Dhá Chultúr (Essays on Interaction of Gaelic- and English-language culture), Coiscéim Áth Cliath 1993; second edition with new preface 2002.
- Inventing Ireland: The Literature of the Modern Nation, Jonathan Cape London 1995; Harvard University Press 1996; Vintage Paperback 1996; Winner Michael Durkan Prize of American Committee of Irish Studies for Best Book of Cultural Criticism 1996; Oscar Wilde Award for Literary Achievement, 1996; Winner of Irish Times Literature Prize for Non-Fiction
- Irish Classics, Granta London 2000; Harvard University Press 2001; Granta and Harvard Paperback 2001; Winner Truman Capote Prize for Best Work of Literary Criticism in the English-Speaking World 2002; Winner Robert Rhodes Prize of American Committee of Irish Studies for Best Book of Literary Criticism 2001.
- The Irish Writer And The World, Cambridge University Press 2005
- Ulysses and Us: The Art of Everyday Living (Faber and Faber, 2009)

Edited:

- An Crann Faoi Bhláth: Contemporary Irish Poetry with Verse Translations, Wolfhound Press Dublin 1989; 1997 (with Gabriel Fitzmaurice)
- The Student's Annotated Ulysses, Penguin Twentieth-Century Classics, London 1992
- The London Exiles: Wilde and Shaw and 'Contemporary Irish Poetry' sections, Field Day Anthology of Irish Writing, Derry 1991
- Two issues of The Crane Bag magazine
- Handbook of the Irish Revival 1891-1922, Abbey Theatre Press, Dublin 2015 (with P. J. Matthews)

Pamphlets:

- Anglo-Irish Attitudes, Field Day Derry 1985
- Multiculturalism and Artistic Freedom: Rushdie, Ireland and India, Cork University Press 1992
- Multiculturalism: The View from the Two Irelands (with Edna Longley), Cork University Press 2000

Scripts:

- Samuel Beckett Silence to Silence, BBC, 1984
- A Short History of Ireland, BBC TV, 1986:
- Plus many scripts for BBC Radio 3 on Irish themes 1990–present

Articles:

- The Irish Times:
  - "Declan Kiberd on Bob Dylan's Nobel prize for literature". 14 October 2016.
  - "Irish writers were an early warning system about abuse". 21 October 2017.
