= Irish National Congress =

Irish republican organization

Irish National Congress Comhdháil Násiúnta na hÉireann
- Formation: 1989
- Type: NGO
- Headquarters: Áras an Phiarsaigh, 27 Pearse St, Dublin 2.
- Chair/Cathaoirleach: Paul McGuill
- Secretary: Daltún Ó Ceallaigh
- Website: http://www.inc.ie

The Irish National Congress is an Irish republican organisation formed in December 1989 to prepare for the commemoration of the 75th anniversary of the 1916 Rising. Its members work on a non-party political, non-sectarian basis for a united Ireland, and human rights. They campaign on various other issues such as justice and peace, investigations into political deaths of nationalists and civilians in Ireland, and Irish neutrality.

== History ==
In September 1989 political activist Oliver Kearney, Father Des Wilson, Nora Comiskey of Fianna Fáil, former Fianna Fáil member Richard Greene, Trade unionist Matt Merrigan, Green Party member Patricia McKenna and artist Robert Ballagh formed a committee which decided to launch an "Irish National Congress" in January 1990. The INC's first public meeting was held in Liberty Hall in January 1990.

The leading national artist Robert Ballagh chaired the organisation for ten years and spoke on its behalf in the media. It has made various submissions to Irish government bodies on such matters as Seanad Éireann reform and other constitutional issues.

In the early 1990s Bernadette Devlin McAliskey was a member of the INC's executive committee. The future TDs Mary Lou McDonald (As of 2024, President of Sinn Féin) and Finian McGrath (was, 2019, a Government junior Minister) both served as Leas-Chathaoirleach (Vice-Chair) in the organisation in the mid-90s. Mary Lou McDonald also chaired the organisation from 2000 to 2001. The economist and journalist Damien Kiberd and former minister Kevin Boland were also involved.

The INC has also campaigned against measures such as Ireland reentering the Commonwealth and joining NATO.

The INC is affiliated to the Peace and Neutrality Alliance (PANA).

The bulletin of the INC is Trácht Náisiúnta (National Comment) and its periodical is The Irish Nation, both available on the INC website.

The current officers are:

- Chair: Paul McGuill
- Vice Chair: Paddy Maguire
- Secretary: Daltún Ó Ceallaigh
- Treasurer: Angela O'Mahony
- Communications Officer: Tom Cooper.
