= Mary Lou McDonald =

Irish politician (born 1969)

Mary Lou McDonald TD
- McDonald in 2026

Leader of the Opposition
- Incumbent
- Assumed office 27 June 2020
- Taoiseach: Micheál Martin; Leo Varadkar; Simon Harris
- Preceded by: Micheál Martin

President of Sinn Féin
- Incumbent
- Assumed office 10 February 2018
- Vice President: Michelle O'Neill
- Preceded by: Gerry Adams

Vice President of Sinn Féin
- In office 22 February 2009 – 10 February 2018
- President: Gerry Adams
- Preceded by: Pat Doherty
- Succeeded by: Michelle O'Neill

Teachta Dála
- Incumbent
- Assumed office February 2011
- Constituency: Dublin Central

Member of the European Parliament
- In office 1 July 2004 – 20 June 2009
- Constituency: Dublin

Personal details
- Born: Mary Louise McDonald; 1 May 1969 (age 57) Dublin, Ireland
- Party: Sinn Féin
- Other political affiliations: Fianna Fáil (1998–1999)
- Spouse: Martin Lanigan (m. 1996)
- Children: 2
- Education: Trinity College Dublin; University of Limerick; Dublin City University
- Website: Official website

Mary Louise McDonald (born 1 May 1969) is an Irish politician who has served as Leader of the Opposition in Ireland since June 2020, as President of Sinn Féin since February 2018, and as a Teachta Dála (TD) for the Dublin Central constituency since 2011. She previously served as vice president of Sinn Féin from 2009 to 2018 and as a Member of the European Parliament (MEP) for the Dublin constituency from 2004 to 2009.

On 10 February 2018, following a special ardfheis (party conference) in Dublin, McDonald succeeded Gerry Adams to become Sinn Féin's first new leader since 1983 and the party's first female leader since Margaret Buckley (president from 1937 to 1950). She led the party into the 2020 general election, in which Sinn Féin delivered its best ever general election performance, attaining 24.5 percent of the vote and winning 37 seats in Dáil Éireann, one fewer than Fianna Fáil and two more than Fine Gael.

Following Micheál Martin's appointment as Taoiseach in June 2020, after the formation of a Fianna Fáil, Green Party and Fine Gael coalition government, McDonald became Leader of the Opposition. She is the first woman to occupy that position and the first to come from a party other than Fianna Fáil or Fine Gael since the Labour Party's Thomas Johnson in 1927.

== Early life and education ==
Mary Louise McDonald was born on 1 May 1969 to a middle-class family in south Dublin. Her father, Patrick McDonald, was a builder and surveyor, and her mother, Joan, was a housewife. Her parents separated when she was nine years old, and she lived with her mother in Rathgar. She has three siblings, one older and two younger. Her sister Joanne was involved with the socialist republican party Éirígí in the late 2000s and is a teacher. McDonald's great-uncle, James O'Connor, was a member of the Anti-Treaty IRA who was executed at the Curragh Camp during the Irish Civil War. He was charged with illegally possessing firearms, which carried the death penalty at the time. O'Connor was 24 years old. In January 2023, McDonald said that one of her siblings had transitioned to female in 2021, and that she was on a "learning curve" about transgender issues.

McDonald was educated at Rathgar National School and at the Catholic all-girls school Notre Dame Des Missions in Churchtown, South Dublin, where she took part in debating.

After leaving school, McDonald attended Trinity College Dublin, from which she received a bachelor's degree in English Literature. She later studied industrial relations at Dublin City University, and received a Master of Arts degree in European Integration Studies from the University of Limerick in 1995. She worked as a researcher for the Institute of European Affairs, a consultant for the Irish Productivity Centre (a human resources consultancy jointly operated by Ibec and ICTU), and a trainer in the Partnership Unit of the Educational and Training Services Trust.

McDonald became involved with the Irish National Congress, a cross-party republican organisation, and became it's chairperson in 2000. She led a protest in Dublin against the involvement of the city's Lord Mayor in the unveiling of a plaque at the location where the Grand Orange Lodge of Ireland held its first meeting in 1798.

== Political career ==
McDonald started her political career by first joining Fianna Fáil in 1998, but she left the party after a year due to core policy differences, particularly in relation to Northern Ireland and social justice. Asked in 2014 about her participation in Fianna Fáil, McDonald stated she had been "in the wrong party" and quickly realised that Sinn Féin was a more appropriate party for her Republican views after meeting Sinn Féin members through the Irish National Congress.

=== European Parliament and early Dáil attempts ===
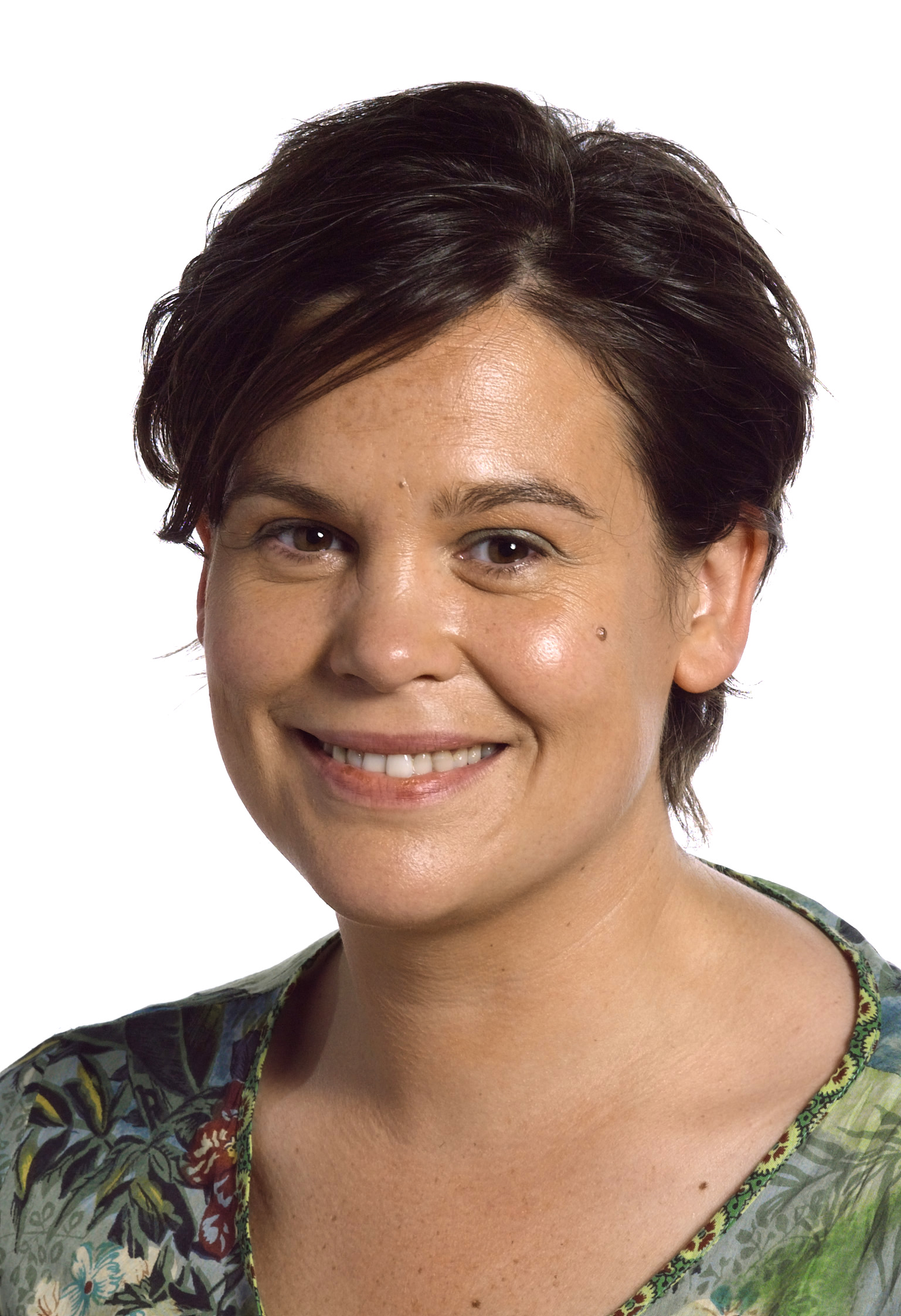
McDonald's official European Parliament portrait, circa 2004

McDonald has been a member of the Sinn Féin party leadership since 2001.

She first ran for office when she unsuccessfully contested the Dublin West constituency for Sinn Féin at the 2002 general election, polling 8.02% of first preference votes.

In September 2003, McDonald attracted criticism when she spoke at a rally in Dublin to commemorate Seán Russell, an IRA leader who had actively collaborated with Nazi Germany, offered the Nazis the IRA's support during WWII, and met with Joachim von Ribbentrop.

In 2004, McDonald became Sinn Féin's first MEP in Ireland, when she was elected at the 2004 European Parliament election for the Dublin constituency, receiving over 60,000 first preference votes. She served as one of two Sinn Féin MEPs, the other being Bairbre de Brún who was representing Northern Ireland. In 2007, she was shortlisted for the 'MEP of the Year' award by the European Parliament magazine for "making the most valuable contribution in the field of employment policy". McDonald sat as a member of the European Parliament's Employment and Social Affairs Committee, and as a substitute of the Civil Liberties Committee.

She was an unsuccessful candidate in the Dublin Central constituency at the 2007 general election. In 2009 she became the vice president of Sinn Féin.

For the 2009 European Parliament election, the number of seats for Dublin in the European Parliament was reduced from four to three. McDonald was in a tight race for the last seat against Fianna Fáil's Eoin Ryan and the Socialist Party leader Joe Higgins. McDonald lost her seat to Higgins, being eliminated at the fifth count. Her first preference vote had declined to nearly 48,000.

In June 2009, McDonald faced criticism after it emerged her campaign office was selling IRA souvenirs and memorabilia.

McDonald has voiced her opposition to the Treaty of Lisbon and has said that the "EU/IMF deal must be turned down".

=== Dáil Éireann (2011–2018) ===
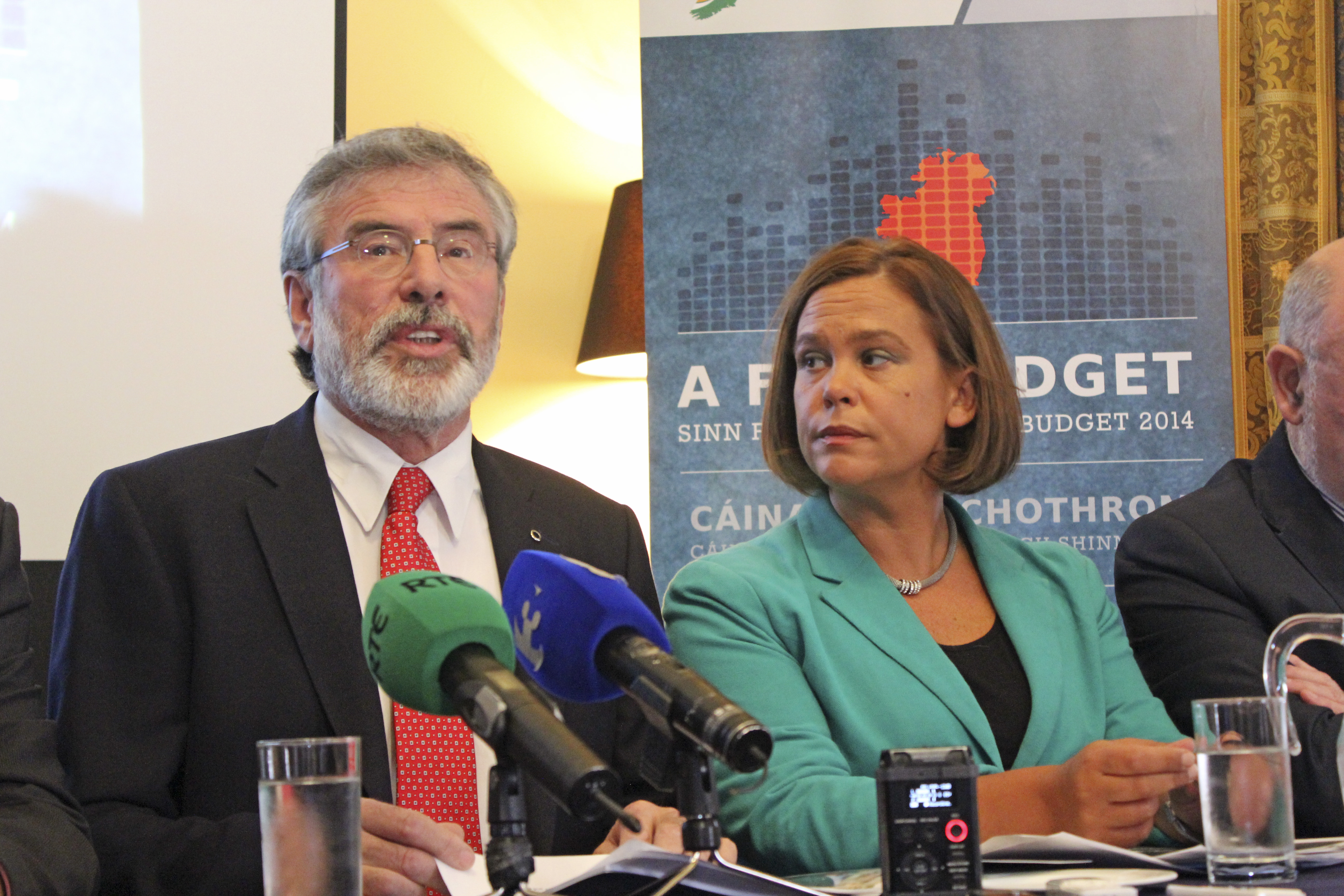
Mary Lou McDonald and Gerry Adams speaking in 2014

McDonald contested the Dublin Central constituency again at the 2011 general election, this time picking up 13.1% of first preference votes; she was successful in taking the last seat in the constituency. Following the election she became Sinn Féin's Spokesperson for Public Expenditure and Reform and was a member of the Public Accounts Committee from then until 2017.

In 2012, McDonald was awarded 'Opposition Politician of the Year' by TV3's Tonight with Vincent Browne political talk show.

In November 2014, McDonald refused to leave the Dáil chamber after a vote resulted in her suspension. McDonald had questioned Tánaiste Joan Burton as to whether the government would allow payments to be taken from citizens' wages or social welfare payments if they did not comply with the payment of newly introduced water charges. McDonald argued that Burton failed to directly answer her questions and was being deliberately evasive and intractable. She, along with a number of Sinn Féin colleagues, remained in the chamber for four and a half hours in protest of Burton's alleged refusal to answer her questions. In response, the Ceann Comhairle Seán Barrett adjourned the Dáil for a number of days.

In December 2015, McDonald initially backed Thomas "Slab" Murphy, whom she described as a "good republican" despite his having just been convicted on nine charges of tax evasion following a trial that was held in the Special Criminal Court in part because, after a 1999 court case in Dublin, the last person to testify against Murphy in that case was bludgeoned to death. She later failed to back party leader Gerry Adams' assertion that Thomas Murphy is a "good republican" after a BBC Spotlight investigation accused Murphy of being a "mass murderer".

After her re-election to the Dáil in 2016 general election, in which she topped the poll in Dublin Central, she became Sinn Féin's All-Ireland Spokesperson for Mental Health and Suicide Prevention, which she held until being elected president of Sinn Féin in 2018.

=== Leader of Sinn Féin (2018–present) ===
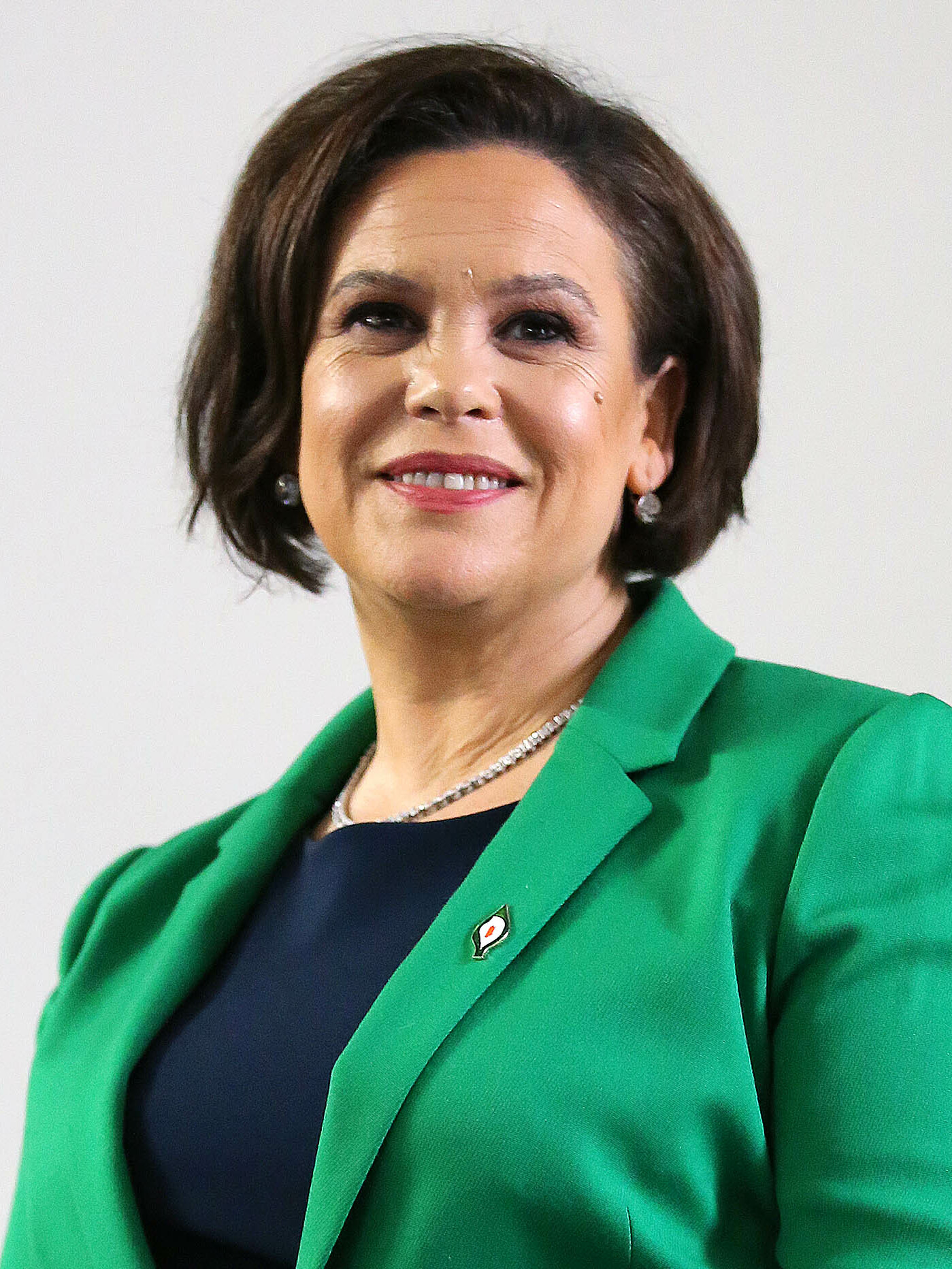
McDonald in 2018

At a Sinn Féin party conference on 18 November 2017, Gerry Adams was re-elected party leader, but announced that he would ask the Sinn Féin party leadership to call for a special Ard Fheis to be held within three months to choose a new president, and that he would not stand for re-election as TD for the Louth constituency in the next election.

At the close of nominations to succeed Adams on 20 January 2018, McDonald was announced as the president-elect of Sinn Féin, as she was the sole nominee to enter the race. She was confirmed as president at a special Ard Fheis on 10 February 2018 in Dublin.

In March 2019, McDonald was criticised by some, including Fine Gael politician Simon Coveney, for walking behind a banner in the New York City St. Patrick's day parade which read "England Get Out of Ireland". In the immediate aftermath of the incident support for Sinn Féin in opinion polls dropped from 18% to 13%, with McDonald apologising for her actions shortly afterwards, but stated she believed the message to be directed at the British state, not the English people.

Shortly afterwards on 24 May 2019, the 2019 European Parliament election in Ireland and 2019 Irish local elections were held simultaneously. In the European elections, Sinn Féin lost 2 MEPs and dropped their vote share by 7.8%, while in the local elections the party lost 78 (almost half) of their local councillors and dropped their vote share by 5.7%. The result was considered "disastrous" for Sinn Féin. McDonald stated "It was a really bad day out for us. But sometimes that happens in politics, and it's a test for you. I mean it's a test for me personally, obviously, as the leader".

However, at the 2020 general election, the party rebounded and attained 24.5% of the first preference votes, placing them ahead of Fine Gael by 3.6% and Fianna Fáil by 2.3%. It was the best general election result in the modern history of Sinn Féin. In the Dublin Central constituency, McDonald topped the poll with 35.7% of the first preference votes.

McDonald touted the party's electoral success as a "revolution" and expressed her desire to form a coalition government, declaring that Ireland "is no longer a two-party system". Sinn Féin TD Matt Carthy credited McDonald's leadership and her ability to clarify Sinn Féin's policies to the electorate with contributing to the stark turn around between the May elections of 2019 and the general election result of 2020. McDonald's high satisfaction rating as party leader was also cited by others as another contributing factor in Sinn Féin's result.

=== Leader of the Opposition (2020–present) ===
McDonald was nominated as Taoiseach on 20 February 2020, but was defeated 45 to 84. On 26 June 2020, Fianna Fáil, Fine Gael, and the Green Party formed a coalition government, leaving Sinn Féin as the largest opposition party, and McDonald as Leader of the Opposition. She dismissed the coalition agreement as a "marriage of convenience", and accused Fianna Fáil and Fine Gael of conspiring to exclude Sinn Féin from government.

In March 2023, McDonald told Der Spiegel that she expected an Irish unity referendum to be 'within this Decade'.

At the 2024 general election, McDonald was re-elected to the Dáil topping the poll in Dublin Central with Sinn Feín increased their seat share by 2 seats remaining the second largest party by representation in the Dáil and attained 19% of the first preference votes a fall of 5.5% from 2020 and fell behind Fianna Fáil by 2.9% and Fine Gael by 1.8%.

McDonald was nominated as Taoiseach on 18 December 2024, but was defeated 44 to 110.

== Public image ==
McDonald has been credited with being part of a new generation of Sinn Féin members, who have broadened its appeal and increased its vote since she first held public office. She became the party's first MEP in 2004, receiving more than triple the percentage of votes the party had received five years earlier. Writing on McDonald and the 2004 election success for Sinn Féin (using the subheading '"Shopaholic Trinity girl is face of new Sinn Fein"), The Times described McDonald as "more Brown Thomas beret than balaclava" and "part of a new generation of Sinn Féiners." The paper continued by stating that "another Trinity graduate was elected in Donaghmede, while party candidates in Dublin also included a philosophy student and somebody called Pembroke, an unlikely name for a republican. The irony is that the smoked-salmon socialists are just as effective at mopping up working-class votes as the middle-aged Sinn Fein men who saw 'action' in the 1980s or served time in prison. McDonald stretched the Sinn Fein constituency to the full, attracting votes and transfers from leafy suburbs as well as ghettoes."

McDonald has been credited for her leadership ability and popular appeal. Kathy Sheridan of The Irish Times wrote of McDonald: "It is a cliche to say that Mary Lou McDonald is an enigma but it's nonetheless true. Likable, warm and approachable yet never quite revealing herself. A straight-talker who appears to shoot from the hip yet says nothing that has not been thoroughly considered." Sheridan also claimed that she was "the embodiment of educated, Dublin 6 middle-class privilege who peddles a persuasive anti-establishment line and attracts the kind of adoring scrums last seen in Bertie Ahern's heyday." Sheridan summarised that she had brought Sinn Féin into the mainstream of Irish politics." As of November 2021, Sinn Féin, under her leadership, was the most popular party in opinion polls.

Those critical of McDonald's public image point to her handling of allegations of bullying and other abuses within Sinn Féin. Critics have negatively responded to her reaction to the Máiría Cahill affair of the 2010s, in which Cahill alleged that members of the Provisional IRA had sexually abused her as a teenager and subsequently that this information was suppressed by members of Sinn Féin. McDonald's handling in 2022 of allegations of bullying within the party from Violet-Anne Wynne have also been met with criticism, with journalist Jennifer Bray describing the situation as putting McDonald and her leadership "in a very unflattering light". From 2015 onwards, McDonald has had to distance herself from former Sinn Féin councillor Jonathan Dowdall, who in 2018 was found guilty of the kidnap and torture of a man, and in 2022 plead guilty to facilitating the killing of David Byrne. Dowdall became a Sinn Féin councillor in 2014 in McDonald's constituency and has been described by the Guardian as a McDonald "protege" during the year-long period in which he worked as a councillor. The Guardian went on to suggest that the Dowdall connection had "tainted" McDonald's image.

In September 2026, McDonald and Michelle O'Neill joined a protest organised by the Garvaghy Road Residents' Coalition in Portadown. The protesters blocked the route of the Portadown District of the Orange Order, which had been granted permission by the High Court to march down the Garvaghy Road for the first time in 28 years. The district later said in a statement that it had made a formal complaint to the PSNI Chief Constable about McDonald and O'Neill, adding that faith in the law "continues to erode".

== Harassment ==
In July 2024, a death threat was made against McDonald in a video posted on TikTok by a man who said he would shoot and kill her. McDonald described the threat on her life as "very shocking and very disturbing" and reported the matter to the Garda Síochána. A 28-year-old man was arrested, and in March 2025 pleaded guilty to two counts of making a threat to kill or cause harm following a court case.

== Personal life ==
McDonald's husband, Martin Lanigan, works as a gas control superintendent for the emergency dispatch division of Gas Networks Ireland, a state infrastructure provider. They have two children. She lives in Cabra, Dublin. She learned Transcendental Meditation "for resilience and for keeping myself grounded and calm."

=== Health ===
McDonald has asthma. In April 2020, she announced that she had tested positive for COVID-19 following a test she took on 28 March. She said that she had recovered from the condition but had developed pleurisy in her right lung. She said that the Public Health Doctor had told her that she was no longer infected or infectious. In 2023, McDonald confirmed that she had undergone a hysterectomy to remove her ovaries and womb. Her recovery went well and she soon returned to her political work.

Party political offices
Preceded by Mitchel McLaughlin	Chair of Sinn Féin; 2005–2009	Succeeded by Declan Kearney
Preceded by Pat Doherty	Vice president of Sinn Féin; 2009–2018	Succeeded by Michelle O'Neill
Preceded by Gerry Adams	President of Sinn Féin; 2018–present	Incumbent
Political offices
Preceded by Micheál Martin	Leader of the Opposition; 2020–present	Incumbent

Dáil	Election	Deputy (Party)	Deputy (Party)	Deputy (Party)	Deputy (Party)
19th	1969	Frank Cluskey (Lab)	Vivion de Valera (FF)	Thomas J. Fitzpatrick (FF)	Maurice E. Dockrell (FG)
20th	1973	Frank Cluskey (Lab)	Vivion de Valera (FF)	Thomas J. Fitzpatrick (FF)	Maurice E. Dockrell (FG)
21st	1977	Constituency abolished			

Dáil	Election	Deputy (Party)	Deputy (Party)	Deputy (Party)	Deputy (Party)	Deputy (Party)
22nd	1981	Bertie Ahern (FF)	Michael Keating (FG)	Alice Glenn (FG)	Michael O'Leary (Lab)	George Colley (FF)
23rd	1982 (Feb)	Bertie Ahern (FF)	Michael Keating (FG)	Tony Gregory (Ind.)	Michael O'Leary (Lab)	George Colley (FF)
24th	1982 (Nov)	Bertie Ahern (FF)	Michael Keating (FG)	Tony Gregory (Ind.)	Alice Glenn (FG)	George Colley (FF)
24th	1983 by-election	Bertie Ahern (FF)	Michael Keating (FG)	Tony Gregory (Ind.)	Alice Glenn (FG)	Tom Leonard (FF)
25th	1987	Bertie Ahern (FF)	Michael Keating (PDs)	Tony Gregory (Ind.)	Dermot Fitzpatrick (FF)	John Stafford (FF)
26th	1989	Bertie Ahern (FF)	Pat Lee (FG)	Tony Gregory (Ind.)	Dermot Fitzpatrick (FF)	John Stafford (FF)
27th	1992	Bertie Ahern (FF)	Jim Mitchell (FG)	Tony Gregory (Ind.)	Joe Costello (Lab)	4 seats 1992–2016
28th	1997	Bertie Ahern (FF)	Jim Mitchell (FG)	Tony Gregory (Ind.)	Marian McGennis (FF)	4 seats 1992–2016
29th	2002	Bertie Ahern (FF)	Dermot Fitzpatrick (FF)	Tony Gregory (Ind.)	Joe Costello (Lab)	4 seats 1992–2016
30th	2007	Bertie Ahern (FF)	Cyprian Brady (FF)	Tony Gregory (Ind.)	Joe Costello (Lab)	4 seats 1992–2016
30th	2009 by-election	Bertie Ahern (FF)	Cyprian Brady (FF)	Maureen O'Sullivan (Ind.)	Joe Costello (Lab)	4 seats 1992–2016
31st	2011	Mary Lou McDonald (SF)	Paschal Donohoe (FG)	Maureen O'Sullivan (Ind.)	Joe Costello (Lab)	4 seats 1992–2016
32nd	2016	Mary Lou McDonald (SF)	Paschal Donohoe (FG)	Maureen O'Sullivan (Ind.)	3 seats 2016–2020	
33rd	2020	Mary Lou McDonald (SF)	Paschal Donohoe (FG)	Gary Gannon (SD)	Neasa Hourigan (GP)	4 seats from 2020
34th	2024	Mary Lou McDonald (SF)	Paschal Donohoe (FG)	Gary Gannon (SD)	Marie Sherlock (Lab)	4 seats from 2020
34th	2026 by-election	Mary Lou McDonald (SF)	Daniel Ennis (SD)	Gary Gannon (SD)	Marie Sherlock (Lab)	4 seats from 2020
