= Christian Solidarity Party =

Defunct Irish political party

Christian Solidarity Party Comhar Críostaí
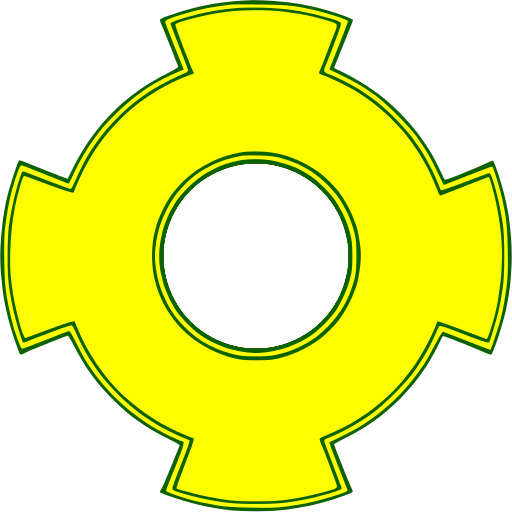
- Leader: Unknown
- Founder: Gerard Casey
- Founded: 1991
- Headquarters: 14 North Frederick Street, Dublin 1
- Ideology: Social conservatism; Communitarianism
- Political position: Right-wing
- Colours: Lemon yellow

The Christian Solidarity Party (Irish: Comhar Críostaí) was a minor political party in Ireland. It had no representation at local or national level. Founded in 1991 as the Christian Principles Party, it stood candidates in the 1991 local elections, it was reformed as the Christian Centrist Party and ran candidates in the 1992 general election receiving 0.2% of first preference votes. It was renamed in 1994 to incorporate the word "Solidarity" following a mutual pledge of support between the party and the conservative advocacy group, Family Solidarity. Its first candidate was Catherine Kelly, contesting the 1994 Cork South-Central by-election, who received 1,704 (4.0%) first preference votes. The CSP took part in the 1997 general election and contested each general election, and a number of other by-elections until 2011. It also fielded candidates in Local and European Parliament elections.

In the 2013 Meath East by-election the CSP supported the Direct Democracy Ireland (DDI) candidate Ben Gilroy taking out newspaper adverts to support him, previously some CSP candidates included DDI on their election literature.

In 2013 the party lobbied the Standards in Public Office to Committee against the mandatory requirement for political parties accounts to be audited by an external body, claiming this would be a very high expense for a small party, whereas parties represented in the Dáil have access to public funds for this.

In January 2014 the party's entry in the official register of political parties was cancelled. Despite this it legally carried on as a political party. In 2015, the Christian Solidarity party was registered as a third party with the Standards in Public Office, to receive donations for political purposes. At a much reduced capacity, it continues to campaign on a socially conservative platform, most recently, to oppose the 2024 constitutional referendums on the Family and Care

== Ideology ==
It advocates an orthodox version of Catholic social teaching, and its main proposals are based upon traditional, and unequivocal, anti-abortion natalism. The party promotes traditional family values and campaigns against marriage and adoption by same-sex couples. The Party made written and oral submissions to various Oireachtas committees regarding proposed legislation on such family and social issues, as well as on other issues such as Seanad reform. The party describes itself as follows:

The Christian Solidarity Party is dedicated to the causes of Life, the Family and the Community. The CSP promotes policies that safeguard the value of human life from conception to natural death, that support the position of the family as the fundamental unit group of society, and that allow human communities to flourish in a manner consistent with human dignity.

The party also campaigned against the announced closure of Ireland's embassy to the Vatican in 2011 and held a small demonstration outside of Leinster House.

== Prominent members ==
Richard Greene, its former leader, stepped down on 13 December 2012. Gerard Casey, who was the founder and led the party initially, is no longer active. Paul O'Loughlin, was leader and Dublin Central candidate. O'Loughlin's predecessor was Cathal Loftus. Daire Fitzgerald replaced Paul O'Loughlin on 21 November 2016.

=== Leaders ===
- Gerard Casey (1991–1999)
- Paul O'Loughlin (–2011)
- Richard Greene (2011–2012)
- Cathal Loftus (2012–)
- Paul O'Loughlin (–2016)
- Daire Fitzgerald (2016–present)

== Election history ==
=== 2014 local elections ===
Although not on the official list of parties, party leader Commandant Cathal Ashbourne Loftus ran as a non-party candidate in the 2014 local elections in the Ashbourne ward, using the Christian Solidarity logo on his election leaflets.

=== 2011 general election ===
The party nominated eight candidates in the 2011 general election five in Dublin and one each in Limerick, Meath and Cork.

- Paul O'Loughlin (Dublin Central)
- Michael Larkin (Dublin North-West)
- Jane Murphy (Dublin South)
- Colm Callanan (Dublin South-Central)
- Daire Fitzgerald (Dún Laoghaire)
- Conor O'Donoghue (Limerick City)
- Manus MacMeanmain (Meath West)
- Harry Rea (Cork North-Central)

At the party's election launch news conference conducted by then leader, Richard Greene stated that the party will campaign on an anti-abortion and what it calls a 'Euro-Realist' platform and that it will oppose making the poor pay for the economic crisis.

The party's Meath West candidate, Manus MacMeanmain (who polled 0.6% of first preference votes) was reportedly unhappy that the Christian Solidarity Party's logo was not present on the ballot paper, and claimed that the image that was used looked like "a bunch of nuts".

The party polled 0.1% of the votes and no deposits were saved.

=== 2009 local elections ===
For the 2009 local elections, they fielded candidates in 13 constituencies. They were:

- Paul O'Loughlin (North Inner City, Dublin City Council)
- Clare Flynn (Ballinasloe, Galway County Council)
- Conor O'Donoghue (Limerick City Council North)
- Colm Callanan (Crumlin-Kimmage, Dublin City Council. 5 LEAs for Laois County Council: Borris-in-Ossory, Emo, Luggacurran, Mountmellick, Portlaoise and 4 LEAs for Offaly County Council: Birr, Edenderry, Ferbane and Tullamore)

None were elected, and none received their election expenses.

=== 2007 general election ===
The CSP ran seven candidates - two women and five men - in the 2007 election. None were successful and all lost their deposits. Party leader Cathal Loftus received 210 votes in Dublin North, 0.38% of the votes and came last out of eight candidates. Paul O'Loughlin, the party's best-performing candidate, who had recently appeared on the party's party election broadcast, scored just 260 votes in Dublin Central, with 0.75% of the vote. The party as a whole scored 0.06% of the total national vote. The party candidates included:

- Mary Doherty (Donegal North-East)
- Clare Flynn (Galway East)
- Paul O'Loughlin (Dublin Central)
- Colm Callanan (Dublin Mid-West)
- Michael Redmond (Dublin South-Central)
- Conor O'Donoghue (Limerick East)

None were elected.

=== 2004 European Parliament election ===
In the 2004 European Parliament election, the CSP announced it had no plans to run, but later announced Barry Despard as a candidate. He came ninth of twelve candidates in the Dublin constituency with 5,352 first-preference votes, or 1.3% of the valid poll.

=== 2002 general election ===
In the 2002 general election, the CSP ran 19 candidates, between the ages of 22 and 82. Some ran in more than one constituency. They spent €12,284.71 on the campaign. The party polled 0.26% of the vote. No candidates were elected, all losing their deposits.

- Tony Smith, Cavan–Monaghan - 358 votes
- Derek J Whelan, Clare - 176 votes
- Patrick Manning, Cork East - 187 votes
- Gerry Duffy, Cork North-Central - 215 votes
- Gerry Duffy, Cork North-West - 383 votes
- Paul O'Loughlin, Dublin Central - 366 votes
- Colm Callanan, Dublin Mid-West - 107 votes
- David Walshe, Dublin North - 247 votes
- Michael Larkin Dublin North-West - 154 votes
- Darragh O'Reilly Dublin South-West - 760 votes
- John Smyth, Dublin West - 134 votes
- Michael Redmond, Dún Laoghaire - 265 votes
- Manus MacMeanmain, Galway East - 93 votes
- Michael Redmond, Laois–Offaly - 142 votes
- Conor O'Donoghue, Limerick East - 86 votes
- Patrick O'Riordan, Limerick West - 144 votes
- Brian Lenehan, Longford–Roscommon - 80 votes
- Michael Maguire, Louth - 79 votes
- Michael Redmond, Meath - 180 votes
- John Lacken, Sligo–Leitrim - 166 votes
- Michael Larkin, Tipperary South - 120 votes
- Patrick Walsh, Westmeath - 126 votes
- Michael O'Connor Wexford - 173 votes

=== 1999 European Parliament election ===
In the 1999 European Parliament election, party leader Gerard Casey contested the Dublin constituency. He finished 10th out of 13 candidates with 9,425 first preference votes (3.36%). He lost his deposit.

=== 1997 general election ===
At the 1997 general election, the CSP fielded 8 candidates and polled 0.5% of the vote. No candidates were elected. All lost their deposits.

- Gene Flood, Cavan–Monaghan - 1,024 votes (1.7%)
- Larry McGinn, Cavan–Monaghan - 1,001 votes (1.7%)
- Joe Aston, Clare - 499 votes (1.1%)
- Eddie Mullins, Cork North-Central - 777 votes (1.8%)
- Angela Keaveney, Dublin North - 666 votes (1.6%)
- Gerard Casey, Dún Laoghaire - 2,000 votes (3.7%)
- Brian Curran, Meath - 1,031 votes (1.8%)
- John Lacken, Sligo–Leitrim - 1,359 votes (3.0%)

=== By-elections ===
- 2009 Dublin Central by-election - Paul O'Loughlin - 203 votes (0.7%)
- 2000 Tipperary South by-election - Mary Heaney - 784 votes (2.6%)
- 1999 Dublin South-Central by-election - Manus MacMeanmain - 399 votes (2.0%)
- 1998 Dublin North by-election - Angela Keaveney - 565 votes (1.7%)
- 1996 Dublin West by-election - Gerard Casey 768 votes (2.7%)
- 1994 Cork South-Central by-election - Catherine Kelly 1,704 votes (4.0%)

== Referendums ==
=== 2008/2009: Lisbon Treaty ===
The Christian Solidarity Party campaigned against both Lisbon Treaty referendums. The party also made submissions to the Oireachtas committee on Ireland's future in Europe after the rejection of the Lisbon Treaty by the first vote. Some members participated in the Cóir campaign and in other anti-Lisbon treaty campaigns.

=== 2012: Children ===
The Christian Solidarity Party campaigned, along with a number of other conservative groupings and individuals, for a No vote in the November 2012 children's rights referendum.

The party claimed that the constitutional amendment would give too much power and responsibility to the State with regard to children, with Richard Greene stating that "[t]he real agenda is to dismantle parents' authority to protect their children, especially teenagers, and to increase State control...it could see the law deciding, for example, how far parents may monitor text messages or internet use to protect their children from bullying".

=== 2015: Marriage equality ===
Christian Solidarity/Comhar Críostaí was registered as "approved body" to monitor postal voting and vote counting, with Cathal 'Ashbourne' Loftus designated as its officer, for the 2015 same-sex marriage referendum.

=== 2018: Abortion ===
The party and its members campaigned to retain the 8th amendment in the 2018 abortion referendum.

=== 2024: Family and Care ===
The party issued a press release stating that it opposed both amendments to the constitution proposed in the 2024 Irish constitutional referendums.

== General election results ==
Election	Seats won	Position	First Pref votes	%	Government	Leader
1997	0 / 166	▲10	8,357	0.5%	No seats	Gerard Casey
2002	0 / 158	▲8	4,741	0.3%	No seats	Gerard Casey
2007	0 / 158	▼10	1,705	0.08%	No seats	Cathal Loftus
2011	0 / 158	▼11	2,102	0.1%	No seats	Richard Greene
