= Richard Greene (politician) =

Irish political activist

Dún Laoghaire–Rathdown County Counciller
- In office 1994–1999
- Constituency: Dundrum

Dublin County Counciller
- In office 1991–1994
- Constituency: Clonskeagh

Personal details
- Born: 1950 (age 75–76) Dublin, Ireland
- Party: Christian Solidarity Party (unknown–2014)
- Other political affiliations: Fianna Fáil (c. 1987–1988); Green Party (unknown–1992); Muintir na hÉireann (1994–1997)
- Education: Trinity College Dublin
- Organisations: Cóir; Irish National Congress

Richard Greene (born 1950) is a political activist from Dublin, focusing on conservative family values campaigns, and formerly on opposing extradition to the United Kingdom. He was successively a member of Fianna Fáil, the Green Party, and Muintir na hÉireann, and was a spokesman for Cóir. He subsequently joined the Christian Solidarity Party and became its leader. He was a member of Dún Laoghaire–Rathdown County Council and the Eastern Health Board in the 1990s.

== Education and early career ==
Greene went to national school in Clontarf and then O'Connell School. He got a degree in English literature from Trinity College Dublin, worked a year in France and became a secondary-school teacher, and subsequently a careers guidance counsellor.

== Extradition ==
Greene joined Fianna Fáil and co-founded an unofficial Fianna Fáil members' anti-extradition association to oppose the implementation of the 1987 Extradition legislation, introduced under the European Convention on the Suppression of Terrorism, which envisaged extradition from the Republic of Ireland to Northern Ireland, and reduced the ability of Irish republican suspects to avoid extradition for "political crimes". The controversial case of Father Patrick Ryan gave the group publicity. Greene was expelled from his cumann of Fianna Fáil on 3 October 1988 for "conduct unbecoming a member", reinstated two weeks later on appeal to the Dáil constituency Comhairle, and re-expelled by the national executive on 15 December.

In January 1990, Greene was elected to the founding executive of the Irish National Congress, a newly formed lobby campaigning for "a British withdrawal from Ireland". He also campaigned against the extradition of Dessie Ellis in 1990. He was a member of a committee which in 1991 secured a memorial in the Garden of Remembrance to the victims of the 1974 Dublin and Monaghan bombings.

== County councillor ==
Greene subsequently joined the Green Party, and unexpectedly won a seat on Dublin County Council in the Clonskeagh district in the 1991 local elections. He publicly opposed the X Case judgment and defended Articles 2 and 3 of the Constitution, persisting despite warnings from party colleagues that these were unauthorised by party policy. After Roger Garland moved to have him expelled, he resigned on 6 April 1992.

He was Public Relations Officer of Right-to-Life Ireland, an umbrella group of anti-abortion organisations opposed to the Maastricht Treaty which campaigned for a No-vote in the ratification referendum. Greene ran in the 1992 general election in Dublin South as an Independent, but endorsed by the Christian Centrist Party. He sought an injunction in the High Court against the wording of the 1992 "Right to Life" referendum, but withdrew it when he offered no alternative wording.

Greene supported all the rezoning motions at the July 1993 meeting. In 1993, Greene founded the Irish Civil Rights Association, which opposed the Criminal Justice (Public Order) Bill, 1993 which restricted the conduct of participants at public protests.

Under the 1994 Act which split Dublin into three new county council areas, Greene became a member of Dún Laoghaire–Rathdown County Council. Also in 1994, Greene became founding chairman of Muintir na hÉireann. In November, the group was denied official registration as a political party as it was not organised to fight elections; Greene contended the party had almost 1,000 members in 12 constituencies. It was eventually registered in April 1995.

The party endorsed Mildred Fox in the 1995 Wicklow by-election for her anti-abortion stance. Greene criticised Fox when, having won the by-election, she abstained, rather than opposing, the constitutional amendment to allow divorce.

In the ensuing referendum campaign, Muintir's Emmanuel Sweeney suggested that then government minister Mervyn Taylor and TD Alan Shatter might not understand Christian marriage. Since both were Jewish, this was condemned as "anti-semitic". Greene denied the charge but defended the remarks. He supported a High Court challenge to the referendum result. Other anti-divorce campaigners distanced themselves from the comments.

In the run-up to the 1996 referendum on restricting the right to bail, Greene wrote to the United Nations asking for election monitoring of the government's campaign.

In late 1996, Greene's relationship with Muintir na hÉireann broke down. In December, the party executive voted to expel him, but he disputed their authority to do so, as he was the party officer on the Dáil register of parties. The Dáil registrar subsequently decided that Greene was no longer an officer, and he was expelled from the party in March 1997.

== Later campaigns ==
Greene lost his council seat at the 1999 local elections. He complained that an RTÉ Television documentary about "political dynasties" broadcast before the poll gave an unfair advantage to featured candidates. The Broadcasting Complaints Commission upheld his protest.

Greene opposed the Treaty of Nice and the second referendum on it. He has acted as spokesperson on television and radio, for the lobby group Cóir which campaigned against the Treaty of Lisbon. He campaigned against a second Lisbon Treaty referendum and has participated in public forums on behalf of Cóir. On 20 November 2008, he led a three-person delegation from Cóir appearing at meeting of the Oireachtas sub-committee on Ireland's Future in the EU. In his opening statement, he said:

We ask the committee today if it will show its respect for the Irish "No" vote by declaring the treaty dead and calling on EU leaders to end the treaty ratification process immediately. If the committee refuses to do so, then Cóir believes that the sole objective of this committee is to attempt to overturn the democratic wishes of the majority of the people who voted "No" to Lisbon. This brazen effrontery and blatant denial of democracy shows the contempt in which the political parties hold the people. Suppressing the sovereign will of the people in such a fashion would be an act of treason, the likes of which has not been seen since the Act of Union.

The delegation withdrew shortly after. Senator Paschal Donohoe, who chaired the meeting, said "It was a disgraceful performance. To accuse any member of this committee of an act of treason is the most appalling and disgraceful comment yet made in this House."

Greene serves as chairman Alliance for the Defence of the Family and Marriage which advocated a No vote in the 2015 Marriage Referendum, and also against the 2015 Children and Family Relationships Bill.
