= Damien Kiberd =

Journalist and commentator

Damien Kiberd is an Irish journalist and commentator. He is one of the four founders of, and was formerly editor of, The Sunday Business Post. He is also a former business editor of The Irish Press, and of the Sunday Tribune. Kiberd has also worked more recently as a presenter of news-discussion programmes on Newstalk and 4fm. Kiberd was a supporter of the republican lobby group, the Irish National Congress in the 1990s. He is patron of The Ireland Institute at the Pearse Centre in the former home of Patrick and Willie Pearse in Pearse Street.

From Dublin, he was educated at Belgrove School and St. Paul's College, Raheny, before studying economics at Trinity College, Dublin.

Kilberd is married to Terri Griffin, whom he met at The Irish Press. They have two children. He is the brother of professor Declan Kiberd.

He was a member of the board of the short-lived Centre for Public Inquiry run by former Business Post journalist Frank Connolly.

His niece Evanna Lynch is an actress most well-known for her role as Luna Lovegood in the Harry Potter films.
