= Angela Bourke =

Irish writer

- Born: 1952 (age 73–74); Dublin, Ireland
- Occupations: Writer, Lecturer, Oral historian
- Writing career
- Pen name: Angela Bourke, Angela Partridge
- Genres: Women in history, women in folklore
- Subject: Irish language

Angela Bourke (former married name Partridge) (1952) is an Irish author, historian and academic who focuses on Irish oral tradition and literature in her books, lectures, and broadcasting.

== Biography ==
Bourke is a Dublin-born writer, oral historian and academic with an interest in the voice of women in folklore. Educated in University College Dublin with an MA in Celtic Studies she travelled to Université de Bretagne Occidentale in 1974. Bourke completed her doctorate in women's religious poetry in Irish folklore, also from University College Dublin. In the 1970s Bourke collected songs in Carna, Conemara. She was the first holder of Princess Grace Irish Library (Monaco) bursary for academic writers, Autumn 2002. She has travelled widely to other universities in Japan, Europe and the US as a guest and visiting professor, including Harvard University from 1992-93. She is Professor of Irish-Language Studies and Head of modern Irish in UCD.

Bourke is a member of the Royal Irish Academy.

== Awards ==
- The Frank O’Connor Award for Short Fiction, 1992
- The Irish Times Literature Prize for non-fiction in 2000 and American Conference for Irish Studies James S. Donnelly Prize, 2001 with The Burning of Bridget Cleary: A True Story

== Selected works ==
=== Folklore studies and biography ===
- Caoineadh na dTrí Muire: Téama na Páise i bhfílocht bhéil na Gaeilge (Baile Átha Cliath: An Clóchomhar Tta, 1983)
- The Burning of Bridget Cleary: A True Story (London: Pimlico 1999)
- Maeve Brennan of the New Yorker (London: Jonathan Cape 2004)

=== Fiction ===
- By Salt Water (Dublin: New Island 1996)
- “Iníon Rí na Cathrach Deirge” (1989)
- “Iníon Rí an Oileáin Dhorcha (1991)

=== Miscellaneous ===
- ‘Working and Weeping: Women’s Oral Poetry in Irish and Scottish Gaelic Poetry’, in Women's Studies Working Papers, No. 7 (UCD Women's Studies Forum 1988)
- Fish stone water: Holy Wells of Ireland, by Anna Rackard, introduced by Angela Bourke (Cork: Atrium 2001)
- The Field Day Anthology of Irish Writing, vols iv and v: Irish Women's Writing and Traditions (2002) ed.
- ‘Adventures with old things’, in The Dublin Review, 4 (Autumn 2001), pp. 5–13
