= Gerard Casey (philosopher) =

Irish academic (born 1951)

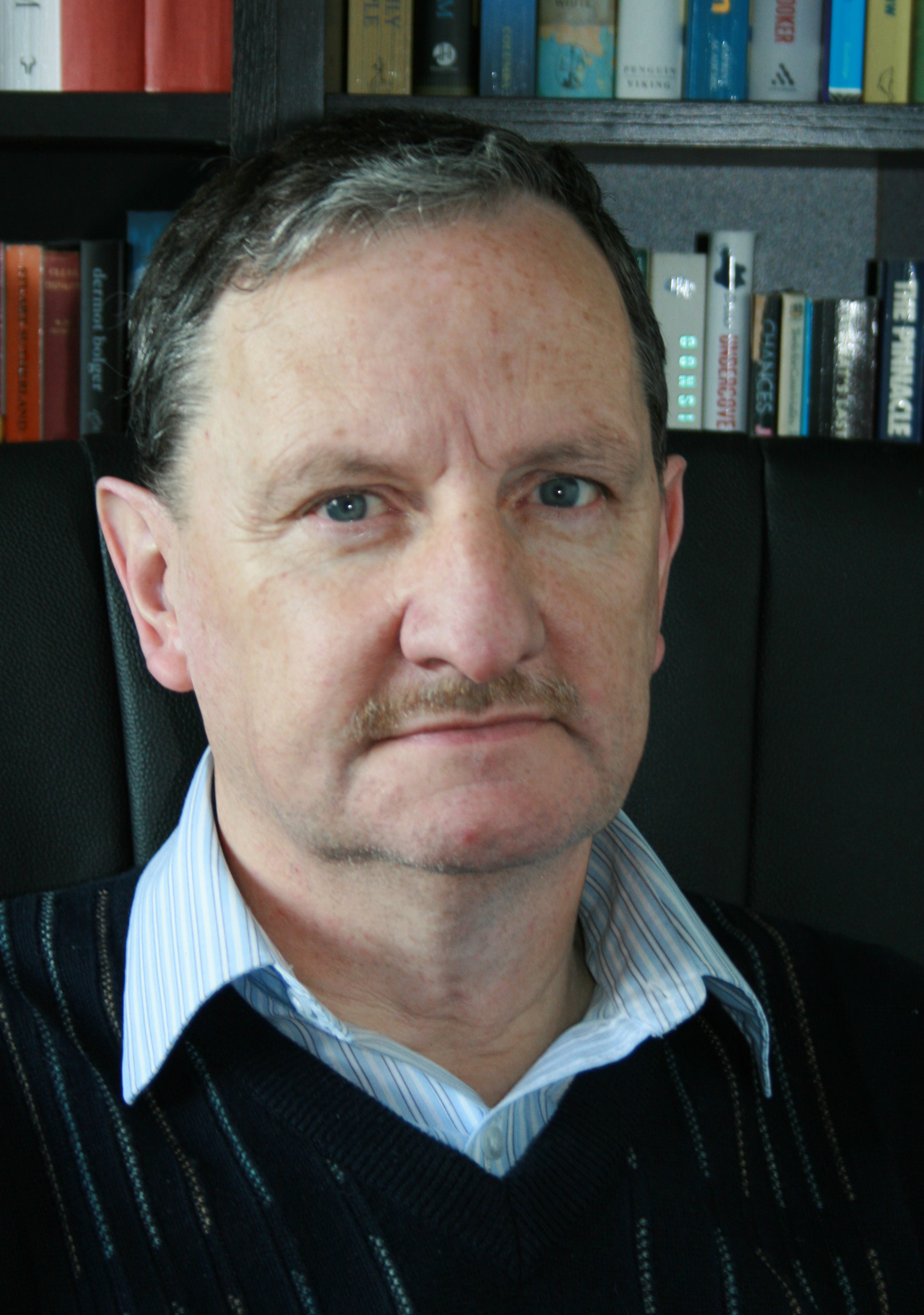
- Born: 1951 (age 74–75)

Education
- Education: University College Dublin; University of London; University of Notre Dame; National University of Ireland

Philosophical work
- Era: Contemporary philosophy
- Region: Western philosophy
- School: Libertarianism
- Institutions: University College Dublin, Catholic University of America
- Main interests: Law; Philosophy; Religion
- Notable works: Freedom's Progress?; ZAP; After #MeToo; Hidden Agender

Gerard Casey (born 1951) is an Irish academic and former politician who is Professor Emeritus at University College Dublin.

== Career ==
He holds law degrees from the University of London (LLB) and UCD (LLM) as well as a primary degree in philosophy from University College Cork, an MA and PhD from the University of Notre Dame and the higher doctorate, DLitt, from the National University of Ireland. He was formerly Assistant Professor at The Catholic University of America (Washington, D.C.), 1983–1986. He was a member of the School of Philosophy in University College Dublin (UCD) (Head from 2001 to 2006) from 1986 until he retired in December 2015. He is a Fellow of Mises UK, an Associated Scholar of the Ludwig von Mises Institute in Auburn, Alabama, and an Associate Editor of the Christian Libertarian Review. He is also a member of the Free Speech Union and Academics for Academic Freedom. He has been a member of the Royal Institute of Philosophy, the American Philosophical Association and The Aristotelian Society. In December 2006, Casey, along with host Pat Kenny and Richard Dawkins, appeared on The Late Late Show to discuss Dawkins's book The God Delusion. He has written several books.

== Activism ==
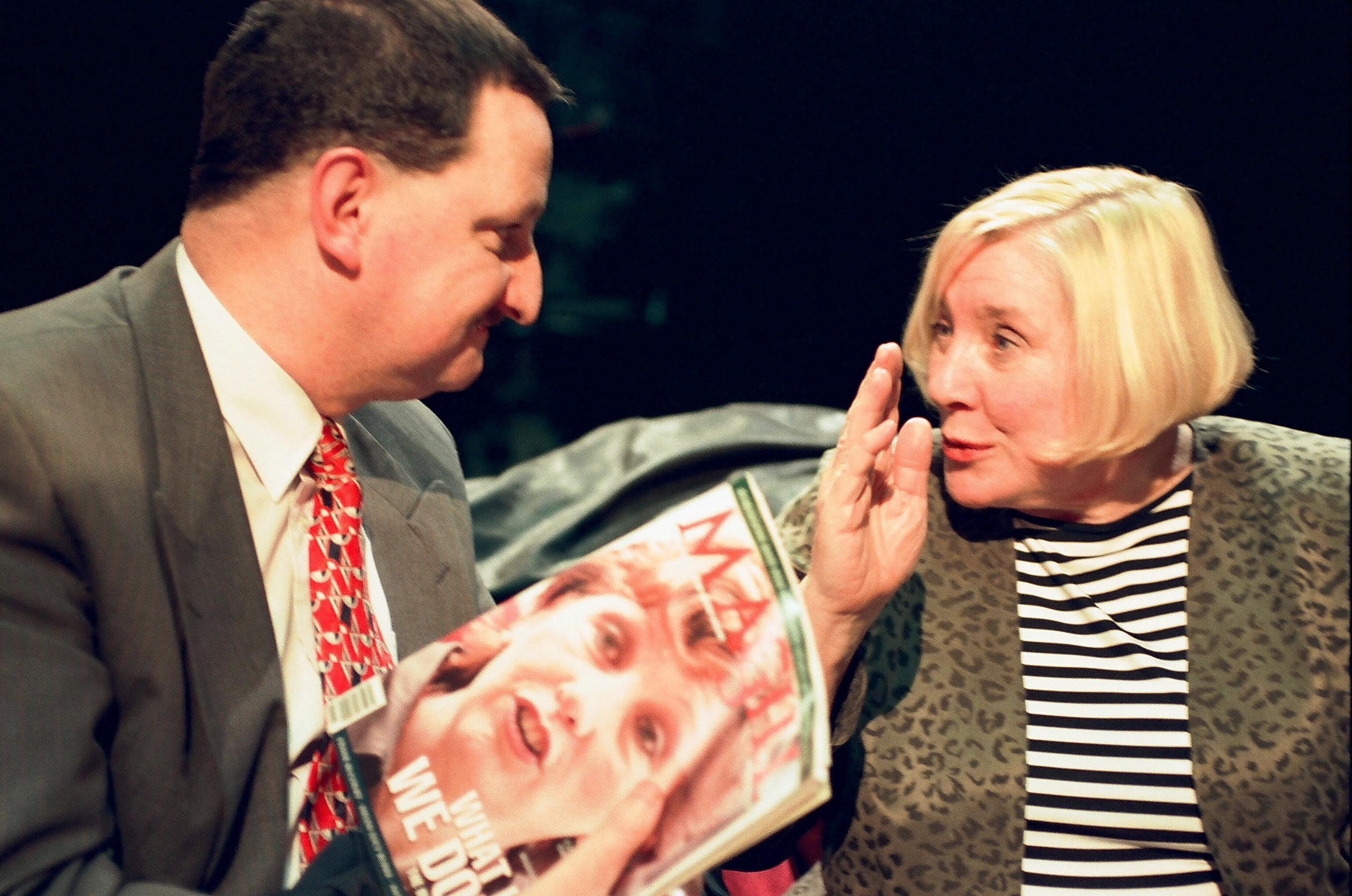
Appearing with Fay Weldon on British television discussion programme After Dark in 1997

Casey was active in Irish politics in the 1990s, leading the Christian Solidarity Party between 1993 and 1999. He now holds libertarian and what he terms (philosophically) anarchistic views. His philosophical interests include political philosophy, philosophy of law and philosophy of religion. He has appeared from time to time on radio and TV in Ireland and the UK, contributing to discussions on topical social and political issues. He describes himself as Catholic in religion, conservative in social matters, and libertarian in political matters.

== Books ==
- Born Alive: The Legal Status of the Unborn Child (Barry Rose, 2005) ISBN 1 902681 46 0
- Murray Rothbard (Continuum, 2010) Vol. 15 in the series Major Conservative and Libertarian Thinkers ISBN 978-1441100795
- Libertarian Anarchy: Against the State (Continuum, 2012) ISBN 978-1441144676
- Freedom's Progress? A History of Political Thought (Imprint Academic, 2017) ISBN 978-1845409425
- ZAP: Free Speech and Tolerance in the light of the Zero Aggression Principle (Societas, 2019)
- After #MeToo: Feminism, Patriarchy, Toxic Masculinity and Sundry Cultural Delights (Societas, 2020)
- Hidden Agender: Transgenderism's Struggle against Reality (Societas, 2021)
