= Centre for Public Inquiry =

The Centre for Public Inquiry (Irish: Fiosrú an Phobail) was established in February 2005 as a non-governmental body to "...investigate matters of public importance in Irish political, public and corporate life". Its board was made up of Mr Justice Feargus Flood the former chairman of the Planning and Payments (corruption) Tribunal and former High Court Judge, Enda McDonagh the chairman of the board of University College, Cork, broadcaster and former editor of the Sunday Business Post Damien Kiberd and solicitor, writer and human rights campaigner Greg O'Neill. Investigative journalist Frank Connolly was named executive director. His investigations into payments to former government minister Ray Burke, contributed to the establishment of the Planning and Payments tribunal and the Morris Tribunal. It was to have been funded by Atlantic Philanthropies to the amount of €4 million over five years. It closed in April 2006 following the withdrawal of this funding and a critical article by the then Minister for Justice Michael McDowell in the Sunday Independent newspaper.

== Mission ==
The mission of the Centre for Public Inquiry was to independently promote the highest standards of integrity, ethics and accountability across Irish public and business life and to investigate and publicise breaches of those standards where they arise. Artist Robert Ballagh designed the logo for the organisation.

== Reports ==
=== Trim Castle, A monument to bad planning ===
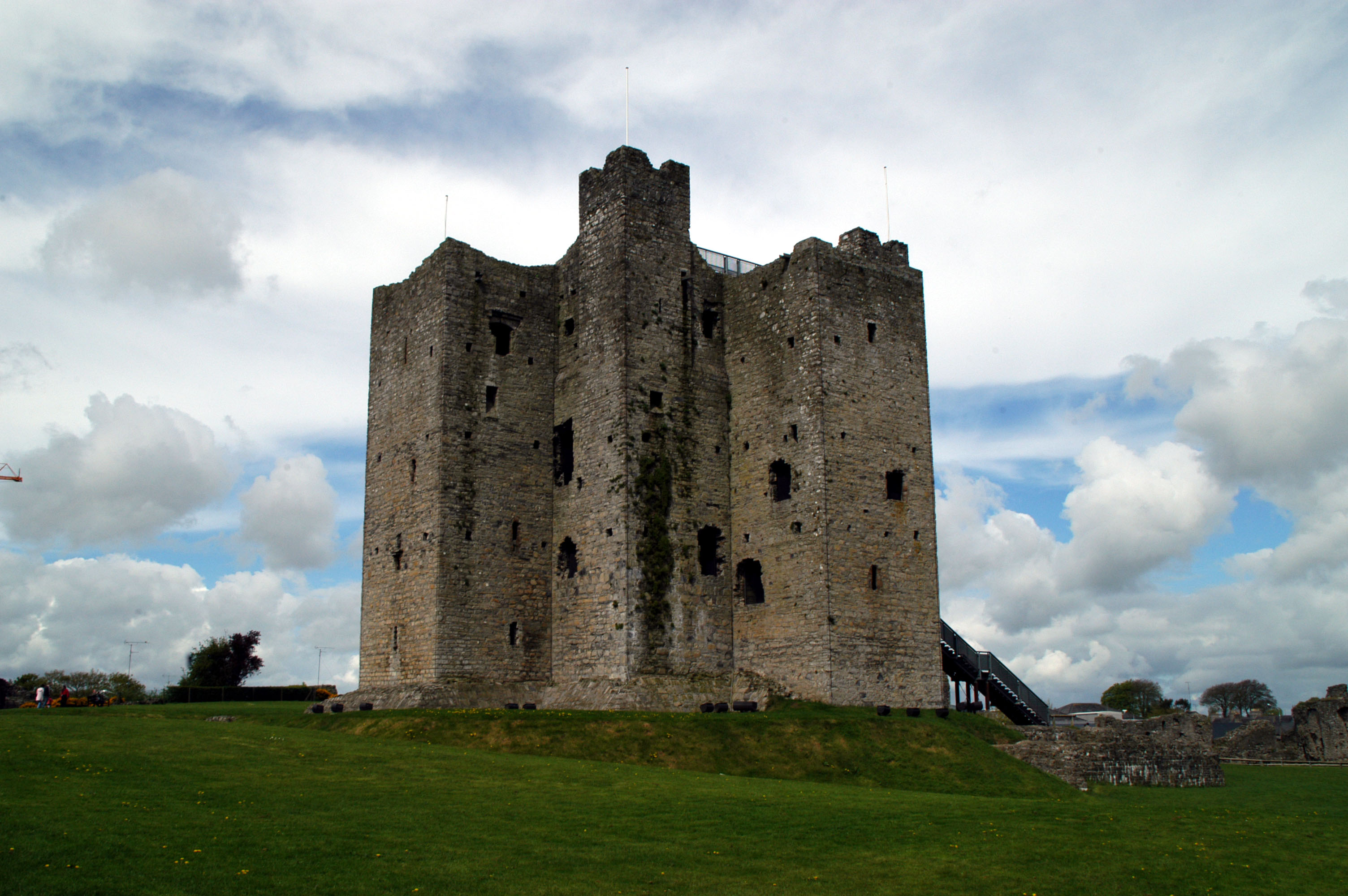
Trim Castle

The first report, issued in September 2005, concerned the construction of a hotel in the shadow of Trim Castle, Trim, County Meath, a national monument in State care. It raised important issues of public concern including the manner in which the objections of the most senior officials charged with protecting the State's heritage were over-ruled by a former Minister. [] The report was also highly critical of former minister for the environment Martin Cullen who was advised that Dúchas, the department's heritage section, consistently expressed concern regarding the scale of the hotel, which was described as insensitive to a national monument in the State's Care. But the minister recommended only that the development be scaled back and the report claimed that "as a result of the instructions from the minister's office no objection was submitted by the department or Dúchas officials to the planning application". Following the grant of planning permission, the report claimed, two officials from the department prepared an objection but "an intervention by the minister's office put a halt to these efforts to lodge an appeal"

=== The Great Corrib gas controversy ===
The second report, issued in November 2005, was about the controversy surrounding the Corrib gas project and the associated pipeline and processing plant proposed for the Erris peninsula in north west County Mayo. It revealed that the disputed pipeline carries a real and substantial risk of failure because of its potential to operate at extremely high pressures. The likelihood of system failure is increased also because of the unknown gas compositions it is required to carry, and the probability of internal corrosion. As a result of these findings the report concludes that the current proposed route is unacceptable because of its close proximity to people and dwellings.

== Allegations against Frank Connolly ==
In December 2005 the executive director of the CPI, Frank Connolly was subject to allegations that he had used a fake passport to gain entry to Colombia, although he was never charged with the offence. The allegations were published in the Irish Independent after the Minister for Justice, Equality and Law Reform Michael McDowell leaked them to journalist Sam Smyth. Connolly denied the allegations, describing them as "false and malicious". He was backed by the CPI's board which stated that: "The Board of the Centre for Public Inquiry reiterates its full confidence in its Executive Director, Frank Connolly and his integrity" and said "...the claim made in Dáil Éireann by the Minister for Justice, Michael McDowell, that either Frank Connolly or the CPI, or both, could pose a threat to the security of the State is entirely without evidential basis, unsustainable, and totally untrue." The Director of Public Prosecutions DPP decided not to prosecute Connolly in 2003. It further went on to say that "a private and public blackening of his character has been unleashed by the Minister. This shows a signal departure from principles of fair dealing and respect for justice to the individual citizen by the State which are absolute, save in the most exceptional cases and where legislated upon by the Oireachtas. The methods adopted by the Minister may well have undermined the status, authority and the statutory independence of the DPP."

== Closure ==
The CPI was a short-lived body. The criticism against Frank Connolly by McDowell and the Sunday Independent under the editorship of Aengus Fanning meant funding for the body from its financial backer Chuck Feeney's Atlantic Philanthropies was withdrawn. Feeney met Taoiseach Bertie Ahern in August. The meeting was not arranged to specifically discuss the work of the CPI, but while the work of the centre was discussed, there was a discussion of Connolly. He also conducted a meeting with McDowell at which Connolly was again discussed. McDowell presented Feeney with documentation pertaining to the allegations. The final straw was the threat of legal action by Treasury Holdings in Dublin in connection with its third report which was under preparation. The government has already come under pressure to explain why the state-owned Dublin Port Company, chaired by former councillor Joe Burke, a political associate of Bertie Ahern, the taoiseach, did not go through a tender procedure before entering into a joint venture with private operators to develop a 32-acre (130,000 m^{2}) site Without the necessary funding the CPI ceased to function.

Tim Pat Coogan, a historian and journalist, stated in 2010 at the Parnell Summer School that it was lamentable that the Centre for Public Inquiry was forced to close.
