= Frank Connolly =

Irish journalist

- Connolly in 2022
- Citizenship: Ireland
- Education: Trinity College Dublin
- Occupations: Journalist, author
- Employers: Sunday Business Post; Ireland on Sunday; Village Magazine; Irish Mail on Sunday; Centre for Public Inquiry; SIPTU

Frank Connolly is an Irish journalist, author, and former head of communications with the trade union SIPTU.

Connolly grew up in Dublin and attended Trinity College Dublin. He previously worked for the Sunday Business Post, Ireland on Sunday, Village Magazine and Irish Mail on Sunday.

His investigations for the Sunday Business Post led to the establishment of two judicial tribunals into political and police corruption in Ireland, the Flood/Mahon Tribunal into planning and payments to politicians in Dublin (1997) and the Morris Tribunal (2002) into police corruption in Donegal. Connolly has published a number of non-fiction books including 'Tom Gilmartin – the Man who brought down a Taoiseach' (Gill & Macmillan, 2014), 'NAMA-Land' (Gill Books, 2017) and 'United Nation – the Case for Integrating Ireland' (Gill Books, 2022). He has also published a novel, 'A Conspiracy of Lies' (Mercier, 2019), which was also released as an audio-book, narrated by actor, Stephen Rea, in May 2024.

He was accused under Dáil Éireann privilege by Justice Minister Michael McDowell of traveling to Colombia using a false passport with his brother Niall and IRA Chief Padraig Wilson. He denied the allegation and was not charged with any offence.

Connolly was an executive director in 2005 of the short-lived Centre for Public Inquiry (funded by Chuck Feeney's, Atlantic Philanthropies), which closed following controversy over his alleged trip to Colombia.

In 2009, he became the head of communications for the trade union SIPTU. Connolly retired from SIPTU in February 2024.
