= Muintir na hÉireann =

Defunct Irish political party

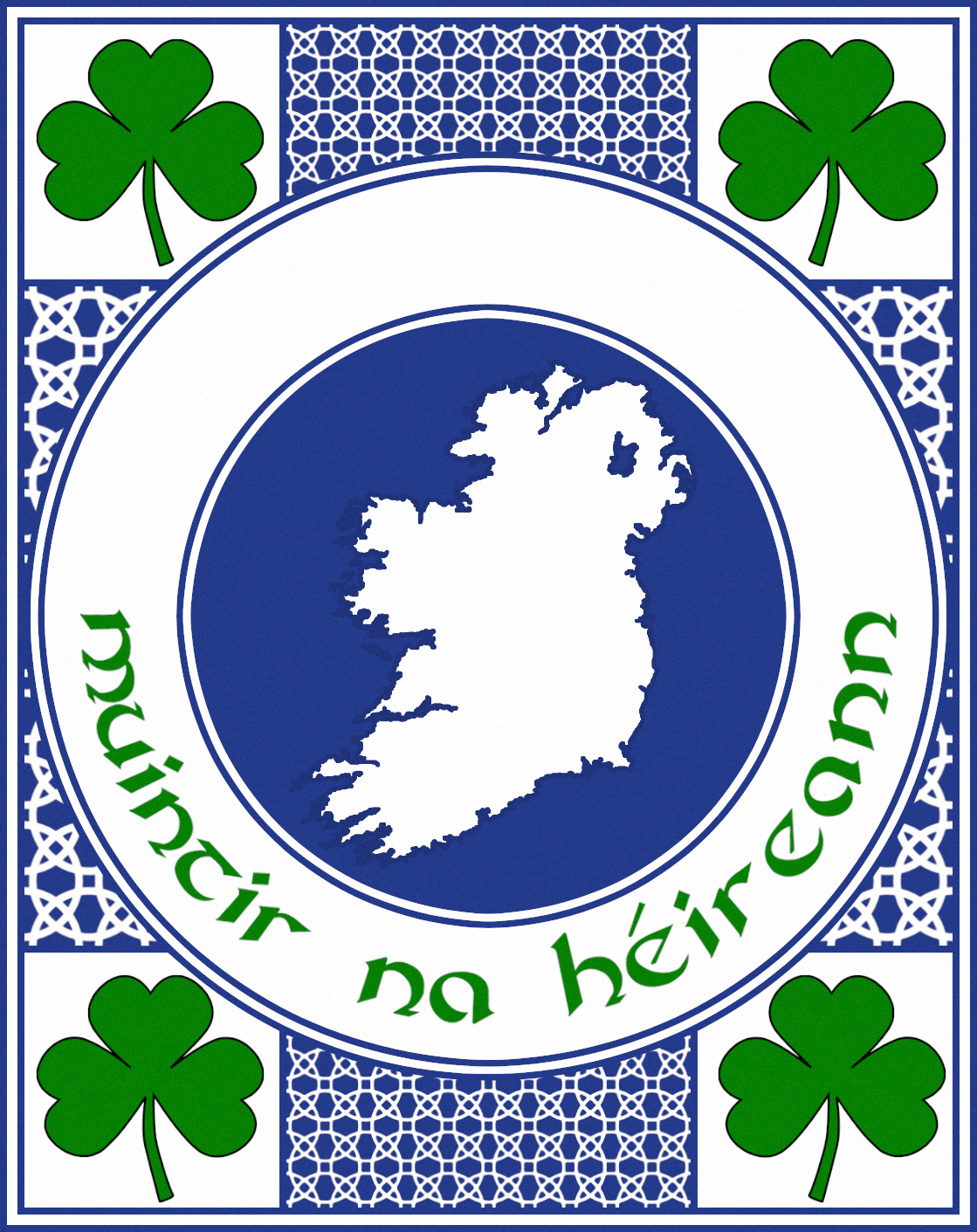
- Leader: Richard Greene
- Founded: 1994
- Dissolved: 1996
- Ideology: Social conservatism

Muintir na hÉireann (Irish: [ˈmˠɪn̠ʲtʲəɾʲ n̪ˠə ˈheːɾʲən̪ˠ]; meaning "People of Ireland") was a minor political party in Ireland, with socially conservative and populist policies. It was founded in 1994, and active in the 1990s. The party had one public representative, former Green Party councillor Richard Greene, who served one term on Dún Laoghaire–Rathdown County Council from 1991 to 1999. Greene left the Green Party in protest at its "left-wing social agenda", particularly its refusal to adopt an anti-abortion policy, and his party reflected his views on issues such as family values and the extradition of Irish republicans convicted of terrorist offenses to the United Kingdom.

In 1995, Muintir supported independence of Chechnya from Russia. The party endorsed Mildred Fox in the 1995 Wicklow by-election for her anti-abortion stance.

In 1996, Muintir sought a boycott of Virgin Media for selling pornography.

In late 1996, Greene's relationship with Muintir na hÉireann broke down.

Though its archived website does not explicitly espouse Christian values in its opening statement, Barberis, McHugh, and Tyldesley (2005) write that Muintir na hÉireann "asserts traditional social values derived from Christian, and specifically Roman Catholic, teaching".

Unlike Nora Bennis's contemporaneous conservative party, the National Party, Muintir did not contest the 1997 general election, apart from Richard Greene's independent candidacy in Dublin South. Greene lost his council seat in the 1999 local elections. The party is defunct.
