= 2014 Wicklow County Council election =

Part of the 2014 Irish local elections

← 2009	23 May 2014	2019 →

All 32 seats on Wicklow County Council 17 seats needed for a majority
	First party	Second party	Third party
Party	Fine Gael	Fianna Fáil	Sinn Féin
Seats won	8	7	6
Seat change	-1	+3	+4
	Fourth party	Fifth party	Sixth party
Party	Green	Independent	Labour
Seats won	1	10	0
Seat change	+1	+7	-6
- Area of Wicklow County Council
Council control before election
Fine Gael
Labour Party
Fianna Fáil
Council control after election
Fine Gael
Fianna Fáil
Independent

An election to all 32 seats on Wicklow County Council took place on 23 May 2014 as part of the 2014 Irish local elections, an increase from 24 seats at the 2009 election. In addition, the town councils of Arklow, Bray, Greystones and Wicklow were all abolished. County Wicklow was divided into five local electoral areas (LEAs) to elect councillors for a five-year term of office on the electoral system of proportional representation by means of the single transferable vote (PR-STV).

Independents proved to be the biggest winners in the elections, gaining 7 seats to return to the council with 10 members. Sinn Féin gained 4 additional seats on the council, leaving them with 6 councillors in total. The additional seats helped to insulate Fine Gael from significant seat losses and they remained the largest party despite losing a seat overall. Fianna Fáil gained 3 seats overall to return with 7 members and though they had more first preference votes than Fine Gael, they won 1 less seat overall. Several of the successful Independents such as Joe Behan, Christopher Fox and Jim Ruttle had former Fianna Fáil connections. The Labour Party polled disastrously in the election and were wiped out in what had been one of their former strongholds, losing all 6 seats. Outgoing councillor and outgoing chairman, Jimmy O'Shaughnessy also lost his seat in the election. O'Shaughnessy was a former Labour member. However, 2 former Labour councillors, Tom Fortune and Tommy Cullen, were returned as Independents.

It was also notable that none of the mayors of the town councils were elected. Mick Glynn (FG; Bray), Malcolm Earls (FG; Wicklow) and Peter Dempsey (Ind; Arklow) all failed to be elected, while George Jones (FG; Greystones) retired after serving over 40 years as a Town Councillor and County Councillor.

== Results by party ==
Party	Seats	±	1st pref	FPv%	±%
Fine Gael	8	-1	10,179	19.9	
Fianna Fáil	7	+3	10,196	19.9	
Sinn Féin	6	+4	8,493	16.7	
Green	1	+1	1,217	2.4	
Labour	0	-6	1,595	3.1	
People Before Profit	0	-	1,054	2.05	
Independent	10	+7	18,228	35.7	
Total	32	+8	51,389	100.0	—

== Results by local electoral area ==
*: Outgoing councillor.
†: Outgoing councillor elected in 2009 in the Wicklow LEA for Labour; contesting both Arklow and Wicklow LEAs.

=== Arklow ===
Arklow: 6 seats
Party	Candidate	FPv%	Count									
Party	Candidate	FPv%	1	2	3	4	5	6	7	8	9	10
Fianna Fáil	Pat Fitzgerald	20.55	1,937									
Fianna Fáil	Pat Kennedy	16.46	1,552									
Fianna Fáil	Tommy Annesley	9.16	864	1,130	1,181	1,186	1,232	1,298	1,380			
Fine Gael	Sylvester Bourke	11.53	1,087	1,132	1,156	1,158	1,179	1,243	1,370			
Independent	Miriam Murphy	6.31	595	651	669	691	747	815	933	949	1,233	1,245
Sinn Féin	Mary McDonald	7.91	746	776	787	811	853	872	972	976	1,088	1,092
Independent	Tom Curran	7.0	660	690	703	731	766	807	892	902	1,075	1,082
Independent	Peter Dempsey	6.54	617	692	695	703	767	813	850	853		
Independent	Jimmy O'Shaughnessy	6.55	618	629	699	714	743	768				
Labour	Mary Mooty	3.42	322	350	355	359	376					
Independent	Nicky Kelly	3.0	283	322	329	349						
Direct Democracy	Brian Whelan	1.03	97	102	104							
Independent	Charlie Keddy	0.53	50	55	56							
Electorate: 16,752 Valid: 9,428 (56.28%) Spoilt: 104 Quota: 1,347 Turnout: 9,532 (56.90%)

=== Baltinglass ===
Baltinglass: 6 seats
Party	Candidate	FPv%	Count								
Party	Candidate	FPv%	1	2	3	4	5	6	7	8	9
Independent	Tommy Cullen	16.90	1,802								
Sinn Féin	Gerry O'Neill	14.45	1,541								
Independent	Jim Ruttle	14.42	1,538								
Fine Gael	Edward Timmins	11.95	1,274	1,374	1,381	1,402	1,405	1,411	1,434	1,513	1,850
Fine Gael	Vincent Blake	11.66	1,244	1,255	1,258	1,285	1,285	1,285	1,389	1,402	1,468
Fianna Fáil	Pat Doran	9.98	1,064	1,086	1,086	1,115	1,115	1,116	1,162	1,305	1,324
Sinn Féin	Aidan Kinsella	6.09	650	685	689	716	723	724	792	823	840
Fine Gael	Lorcan McMahon	5.45	581	596	603	611	615	618	627	723	
Fianna Fáil	Joe McCormac	3.81	406	439	446	456	458	460	473		
Independent	Kevin Byrne	2.51	268	287	312	380	381	382			
Independent	Jillian Godsil	1.81	193	214	250						
Independent	Dominic Plant	0.68	73	90							
Independent	Charlie Keddy	0.29	31	36							
Electorate: 18,501 Valid: 10,665 (57.65%) Spoilt: 123 Quota: 1,524 Turnout: 10,788 (58.31%)

=== Bray ===
Bray: 8 seats
Party	Candidate	FPv%	Count															
Party	Candidate	FPv%	1	2	3	4	5	6	7	8	9	10	11	12	13	14	15	16
Sinn Féin	John Brady	16.95	2,142															
Independent	Joe Behan	12.11	1,516															
Independent	Christopher Fox	11.85	1,484															
Sinn Féin	Oliver O'Brien	5.39	675	1,163	1,205	1,210	1,214	1,222	1,254	1,271	1,283	1,309	1,314	1,336	1,341	1,541		
Independent	Brendan Thornhill	6.55	820	843	896	903	912	947	964	1,004	1,013	1,102	1,138	1,217	1,298	1,498		
Green	Steven Matthews	6.01	752	768	791	797	799	813	826	847	865	888	953	1,073	1,163	1,302	1,346	1,381
Fine Gael	John Ryan	4.71	590	594	607	617	617	620	624	634	647	656	851	942	1,312	1,339	1,347	1,358
Fianna Fáil	Pat Vance	5.41	677	691	720	729	731	737	743	755	767	786	816	860	942	974	986	998
Fianna Fáil	David Grant	5.12	641	665	722	728	729	732	744	760	771	799	814	853	921	970	976	989
People Before Profit	Sharon Briggs	4.47	560	638	667	673	676	703	750	770	783	817	834	881	907			
Fine Gael	Mick Glynn	4.39	550	560	580	588	589	592	595	607	615	630	746	842				
Labour	Ronan McManus	3.58	448	461	481	487	490	497	500	513	623	639	677					
Fine Gael	Sarah Wray	3.93	492	498	505	515	517	519	521	529	554	565						
Independent	Barry Nevin	1.65	207	224	225	250	254	271	288	318	322							
Labour	Tracy O'Brien	1.76	220	231	240	243	244	244	247	251								
Independent	Eugene Finnegan	1.34	168	185	211	217	221	232	246									
Independent	Catherine Hannon-Kennedy	1.16	145	162	179	182	189	198										
Independent	Seay Ledwidge	1.0	126	133	142	146	154											
Independent	Charlie Keddy	0.39	49	54	59	61												
Electorate: 23,347 Valid: 12,522 (53.63%) Spoilt: 148 Quota: 1,392 Turnout: 12,670 (54.27%)

=== Greystones ===
Greystones: 6 seats
Party	Candidate	FPv%	Count										
Party	Candidate	FPv%	1	2	3	4	5	6	7	8	9	10	11
Independent	Jennifer Whitmore	27.44	2,328										
Independent	Tom Fortune	14.64	1,242										
Fine Gael	Derek Mitchell	9.56	811	931	941	944	975	1,006	1,111	1,145	1,278		
Fine Gael	Gráinne McLoughlin	7.46	633	755	771	774	808	851	922	960	1,167	1,215	
Fianna Fáil	Gerry Walsh	7.45	632	732	747	749	755	806	827	1,043	1,068	1,074	1,110
Sinn Féin	Nicola Lawless	8.08	686	757	796	800	823	840	847	882	896	897	1,090
Green	Niall Byrne	3.58	304	462	480	483	542	555	578	611	668	676	800
People Before Profit	Jacqui Johnston	3.88	329	452	490	495	516	532	547	577	591	593	
Fine Gael	Liz Dillon	3.65	310	405	411	412	442	454	511	532			
Fianna Fáil	James Doyle	3.83	325	380	393	395	410	478	505				
Fine Gael	David O'Reilly	3.36	283	345	349	350	369	383					
Fianna Fáil	Taragh Hanley	2.82	239	295	302	304	306						
Labour	Ian McGahon	2.22	188	273	283	286							
Independent	Charlie Keddy	2.10	178	243									
Electorate: 16,531 Valid: 8,485 (51.33%) Spoilt: 81 Quota: 1,213 Turnout: 8,566 (51.82%)

=== Wicklow ===
Wicklow: 6 seats
Party	Candidate	FPv%	Count														
Party	Candidate	FPv%	1	2	3	4	5	6	7	8	9	10	11	12	13	14	15
Sinn Féin	John Snell	15.33	1,577														
Independent	Dáire Nolan	11.26	1,159	1,162	1,169	1,170	1,176	1,180	1,191	1,196	1,266	1,281	1,317	1,370	1,394	1,468	1,475
Fianna Fáil	Pat Casey	11.20	1,152	1,157	1,161	1,162	1,166	1,173	1,176	1,190	1,197	1,218	1,238	1,301	1,320	1,342	1,404
Fine Gael	Shay Cullen	9.85	1,013	1,016	1,022	1,024	1,025	1,035	1,039	1,048	1,061	1,076	1,095	1,156	1,212	1,224	1,330
Fine Gael	Irene Winters	7.47	769	772	772	776	777	794	799	830	834	864	888	930	1,024	1,072	1,328
Independent	Pat Kavanagh	5.19	534	538	543	556	573	587	625	637	655	702	825	880	930	1,109	1,200
Fianna Fáil	Gail Dunne	6.87	707	711	712	715	722	724	729	752	757	775	799	824	885	947	1,082
Fine Gael	Malcolm Earls	5.27	542	547	550	555	560	569	572	595	598	623	647	685	789	827	
Sinn Féin	Garrett O'Reilly	4.63	476	519	522	531	542	549	573	580	615	635	666	708	761		
Labour	Paul O'Brien	4.05	417	424	426	428	432	453	460	471	479	498	543	580			
Independent	Jimmy O'Shaughnessy	3.98	409	422	425	431	437	447	456	471	477	508	539				
Independent	John Goodman	3.72	383	386	387	390	397	404	417	426	435	457					
Independent	Gerry Kinsella	2.40	247	252	258	265	269	281	294	302	307						
Éirígí	Seán Doyle	1.79	184	186	189	191	195	196	217	219							
Independent	Mervyn Morrison	1.69	174	175	175	176	180	190	193								
People Before Profit	Anna Doyle	1.60	165	167	168	172	174	187									
Green	Paul Leahy	1.56	161	161	161	166	170										
Independent	Michael Mulvihill	0.86	88	91	93	94	94										
Direct Democracy	Norman Phillips	0.71	73	74	76												
Independent	Charlie Keddy	0.57	59	59													
Electorate: 18,303 Valid: 10,289 (56.21%) Spoilt: 91 Quota: 1,470 Turnout: 10,380 (56.71%)

== Aftermath ==
Following the elections, the Fine Gael group with 8 councillors, the Fianna Fáil group with 7 councillors and an independent technical group of 4 councillors came together to become the "official/government" side of the council, while the Sinn Féin group with 6 councillors, the Green Party councillor and an independent technical group of 5 councillors formed the "opposition" side of the council. One independent councillor refused to join either side and remained on his own.

Following the election, at the first Annual General Meeting of the council, Christopher Fox (Independent) was elected Cathaoirleach (chairman) of the council. John Ryan (Fine Gael) was elected as Leas-Cathaoirleach (Vice-chairman) of the council.

The "control" of the council was a rainbow coalition of Fine Gael/Fianna Fáil/Independent. The opposition side consisted of Sinn Féin/Green Party/Independent.

== Changes ==
=== Co-options ===
Party	Outgoing	LEA	Reason	Date	Co-optee
Independent	Pat Kavanagh	Wicklow	Death	7 March 2016	Mary Kavanagah
Sinn Féin	John Brady	Bray	Elected to the 32nd Dáil at the 2016 general election	March 2016	Michael O'Connor
Fianna Fáil	Pat Casey	Wicklow	Elected to the 32nd Dáil at the 2016 general election	March 2016	Gail Dunne

=== Changes in affiliation ===
Name	LEA	Elected as	New affiliation	Date
Jennifer Whitmore	Greystones	Independent	Social Democrats	15 November 2015
Oliver O'Brien	Bray	Sinn Féin	Independent	August 2017
Gerry O'Neill	Greystones	Sinn Féin	Independent	August 2017
John Snell	Wicklow	Sinn Féin	Independent	August 2017
Oliver O'Brien	Bray	Independent	Aontú	9 December 2018
Mary McDonald	Arklow	Sinn Féin	Independent	10 March 2019

== Sources ==
- "Wicklow County Council". Irish Independent. Archived from the original on 2 June 2014.
