= 2019 Wicklow County Council election =

Part of the 2019 Irish local elections

← 2014	24 May 2019	2024 →

All 32 seats on Wicklow County Council 17 seats needed for a majority
	First party	Second party	Third party
Party	Fine Gael	Fianna Fáil	Sinn Féin
Seats won	9	7	2
Seat change	▲1	0	▼4
	Fourth party	Fifth party	Sixth party
Party	Green	Labour	Social Democrats
Seats won	2	2	1
Seat change	▲1	▲2	▲1
	Seventh party
Party	Independent
Seats won	9
Seat change	▼1
- Results by local electoral area
Council control before election
Fine Gael
Fianna Fáil
Independent
Council control after election
Fine Gael
Fianna Fáil

An election to all 32 seats on Wicklow County Council took place on 24 May 2019 as part of the 2019 Irish local elections. County Wicklow was divided into 6 local electoral areas (LEAs) to elect councillors for a five-year term of office on the electoral system of proportional representation by means of the single transferable vote (PR-STV).

== Boundary review ==
Following the recommendations of the 2018 Local Area Boundary Committee Report, the Bray LEA from the 2014 Wicklow County Council election was divided in two, as its 8 seats exceeded the terms of reference of the report of a maximum of seven seats per LEA. All other LEAs retained the same boundaries. The boundary committee recommended that Bray be designated a borough district. This was implemented in the initial statutory instrument, but reversed as being contrary to the terms of the Local Government Act 2001.

== Results by party ==
Fine Gael increased their seat numbers by 1 to emerge with 9 seats while Fianna Fáil retained 7 seats overall. Fianna Fáil again won 3 seats in Arklow but did secure 2 seats in Baltinglass. However they emerged seatless in both LEAs in Bray. Sinn Féin lost 4 seats to emerge 2 seats overall both in Bray, the base of the TD John Brady. Several party councillors had quit since 2014 and Gerry O'Neill and John Snell were both re-elected as Independents. The Greens gained an additional seat to return with 2 seats. Labour returned to the council with 2 seats in Bray and Wicklow while Jennifer Whitmore won a seat for the Social Democrats in Greystones. While there were a lot of changes Independent numbers reduced by just 1 seat to 9.

Party	Seats	±	1st pref	FPv%	±
Fine Gael	9	▲1	14,149	26.18	▲6.28
Fianna Fáil	7	0	11,924	22.06	▲2.16
Sinn Féin	2	▼4	4,224	7.81	▼8.89
Green	2	▲1	2,698	4.99	▲2.59
Labour	2	▲2	2,504	4.63	▲1.53
Social Democrats	1	▲1	2,861	5.29	New
People Before Profit	0	0	811	1.50	▼0.55
Aontú	0	0	605	1.12	New
Independent	9	▼1	14,277	26.41	▼9.29
Total	32	0	54,054	100.00	

== Retiring incumbents ==
The following members of Wicklow County Council announced in advance of the poll that they would not be seeking re-election:

LEA	Departing councillor	Party
Baltinglass	Tommy Cullen	Independent
Baltinglass	Pat Doran	Fianna Fáil
Bray	Christopher Fox	Independent
Greystones	Gráinne McLoughlin	Fine Gael
Wicklow	Dáire Nolan	Independent
Baltinglass	Jim Ruttle	Independent
Bray	John Ryan	Fine Gael
Bray	Pat Vance	Fianna Fáil

== Results by local electoral area ==
*: Outgoing councillor elected in 2014.
†: Outgoing councillor coopted subsequent to the 2014 election.

=== Arklow ===
Arklow - 6 seats
Party	Candidate	FPv%	Count						
Party	Candidate	FPv%	1	2	3	4	5	6	7
Fianna Fáil	Pat Kennedy	24.29%	2,471						
Fianna Fáil	Pat Fitzgerald	18.23%	1,854						
Independent	Miriam Murphy	9.26%	942	1,106	1,158	1,194	1,273	1,387	1,525
Independent	Peir Leonard	10.16%	1,033	1,068	1,106	1,178	1,257	1,370	1,466
Fine Gael	Sylvester Bourke	8.77%	892	1,054	1,089	1,107	1,121	1,136	1,425
Fianna Fáil	Tommy Annesley	7.57%	770	1,041	1,207	1,245	1,285	1,339	1,413
Independent	Tommy Breen	6.33%	644	703	754	792	840	950	1,012
Fine Gael	Chantel Kanowga	5.60%	570	803	813	827	843	885	
Sinn Féin	John Kelly	4.65%	473	527	541	560	581		
Independent	Mary McDonald	2.67%	272	295	313	331			
Independent	Pat Hoey	2.47%	251	267	283				
Electorate: 17,703 Valid: 10,172 Quota: 1,454 Turnout: 57.5%

=== Baltinglass ===
Baltinglass - 6 seats
Party	Candidate	FPv%	Count					
Party	Candidate	FPv%	1	2	3	4	5	6
Fine Gael	Edward Timmins	17.62%	1,875					
Independent	Gerry O'Neill	17.12%	1,822					
Fianna Fáil	Patsy Glennon	14.14%	1,505	1,579				
Fine Gael	Vincent Blake	13.91%	1,481	1,526				
Fine Gael	Avril Cronin	11.01%	1,172	1,346	1,447	1,495	1,529	
Fianna Fáil	John Mullen	10.20%	1,086	1,109	1,138	1,179	1,188	1,315
Sinn Féin	Aidan Kinsella	7.30%	777	786	827	870	871	1,115
Social Democrats	Dave McGinn	6.33%	674	690	780	850	854	
Independent	Lorraine O'Brien	2.37%	252	265	305			
Electorate: 19,530 Valid: 10,644 Quota: 1,521 Turnout: 54.5%

=== Bray East ===
Bray East - 4 seats
Party	Candidate	FPv%	Count								
Party	Candidate	FPv%	1	2	3	4	5	6	7	8	9
Green	Steven Matthews (Note: See change below.)	24.98%	1,579								
Sinn Féin	Grace McManus	15.42%	975	1,010	1,129	1,185	1,233	1,251	1,475		
Fine Gael	Aoife Flynn-Kennedy	8.54%	540	585	598	638	652	931	961	968	1,093
Labour	Anne Ferris	8.53%	539	606	615	680	727	785	859	892	1,007
Independent	Malachai Duddy	8.18%	517	553	572	598	706	757	833	878	1,006
Fianna Fáil	Chris Walsh	7.04%	445	469	488	520	553	610	629	646	
People Before Profit	Sharon Briggs	6.22%	393	413	468	502	538	554			
Fine Gael	Edward Whelan	6.85%	433	456	459	476	518				
Aontú	Brendan Thornhill	5.36%	339	355	379	402					
Social Democrats	Eamonn Moran	4.22%	267	307	328						
Independent	Barry Murphy	4.67%	295	303							
Electorate: 11,636 Valid: 6,322 Quota: 1,265 Turnout: 54.3%

=== Bray West ===
Bray West - 4 seats
Party	Candidate	FPv%	Count						
Party	Candidate	FPv%	1	2	3	4	5	6	7
Independent	Joe Behan	28.87%	1,880						
Fine Gael	Melanie Corrigan	22.16%	1,443						
Sinn Féin	Dermot "Daisy" O'Brien	13.99%	911	1,012	1,018	1,101	1,197	1,240	1,265
Independent	Rory O'Connor	8.77%	571	673	696	742	843	984	1,175
Labour	Ian McGahon	7.86%	512	593	607	661	694	793	926
Fine Gael	David Miller	5.18%	337	406	481	488	503	570	
Fianna Fáil	Sárán Fogarty	5.37%	350	439	453	461	488		
Aontú	Oliver O'Brien	4.08%	266	357	360	385			
People Before Profit	June Maher	3.72%	242	286	291				
Electorate: 12,548 Valid: 6,512 Quota: 1,303 Turnout: 51.9%

=== Greystones ===
Greystones - 6 seats
Party	Candidate	FPv%	Count							
Party	Candidate	FPv%	1	2	3	4	5	6	7	8
Social Democrats	Jennifer Whitmore	19.58%	1,920							
Independent	Tom Fortune	14.23%	1,396	1,453						
Green	Lourda Scott	11.42%	1,120	1,244	1,253	1,312	1,337	1,371	1,613	
Fianna Fáil	Gerry Walsh	10.54%	1,034	1,068	1,070	1,073	1,100	1,248	1,334	1,348
Independent	Mags Crean	8.19%	803	902	915	955	982	991	1,226	1,308
Fine Gael	Derek Mitchell	11.05%	1,084	1,133	1,139	1,146	1,152	1,180	1,256	1,274
Fine Gael	Alice O'Donnell	10.22%	1,002	1,084	1,088	1,093	1,095	1,119	1,177	1,200
Sinn Féin	Nicola Lawless	4.35%	427	442	444	459	476	493		
Labour	Anna Waithira Burke	3.78%	371	397	401	423	442	465		
Fianna Fáil	Elaine Wills	2.90%	284	303	309	311	317			
Independent	Charlie Keddy	1.94%	190	192	194	203				
People Before Profit	Pyper Ludlow	1.79%	176	187	189					
Electorate: 18,414 Valid: 9,807 Quota: 1,402 Turnout: 53.3%

=== Wicklow ===
Wicklow - 6 seats
Party	Candidate	FPv%	Count						
Party	Candidate	FPv%	1	2	3	4	5	6	7
Fine Gael	Shay Cullen	21.58%	2,287						
Independent	John Snell	18.65%	1,976						
Fianna Fáil	Gail Dunne	12.36%	1,310	1,388	1,462	1,477	1,571		
Fine Gael	Irene Winters	9.75%	1,033	1,354	1,388	1,406	1,491	1,502	1,532
Labour	Paul O'Brien	10.21%	1,082	1,138	1,223	1,240	1,331	1,340	1,486
Independent	Mary Kavanagh	7.36%	780	811	897	973	1,069	1,081	1,241
Fianna Fáil	Anne Gregory	7.69%	815	944	968	980	1,031	1,053	1,217
Sinn Féin	Muireann Dalton	6.24%	661	688	733	739	790	793	
Independent	Jimmy O'Shaughnessy	4.34%	460	576	671	690			
Independent	Dáire Fitzgerald	1.82%	193	208	227				
Electorate: 20,545 Valid: 10,597 Quota: 1,514 Turnout: 51.6%

== Results by gender ==
2019 Wicklow County Council election Candidates by gender
Gender	Number of candidates	% of candidates	Elected councillors	% of councillors
Men	37	59.7%	20	62.5%
Women	25	40.3%	12	37.5%
TOTAL	62		32	

== Changes after the 2019 election ==
=== Co-options ===
Party	Outgoing	LEA	Reason	Date	Co-optee
Green	Steven Matthews	Bray East	Elected to the 33rd Dáil for the Wicklow constituency at the 2020 general election	25 February 2020	Erika Doyle
Social Democrats	Jennifer Whitmore	Greystones	Elected to 33rd Dáil for the Wicklow constituency at the 2020 general election	25 February 2020	Jodie Neary
Independent	Mags Crean	Greystones	Resignation in May 2022	14 June 2022	Stephen Stokes
Social Democrats	Jodie Neary	Greystones	Resignation in November 2022	December 2022	Mark Barry
Sinn Féin	Grace McManus	Bray East	Resignation in October 2023	January 2024	Mick Ryan
