= 2020 Seanad election =

Election to the 26th Seanad

- 30–31 March 2020

60 members of the Seanad Éireann 30 seats needed for a majority
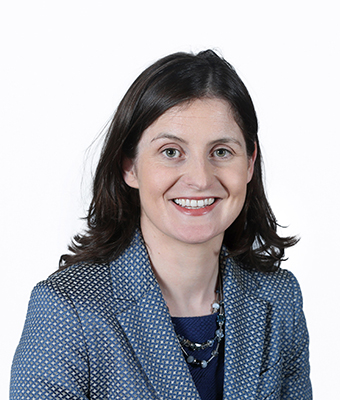

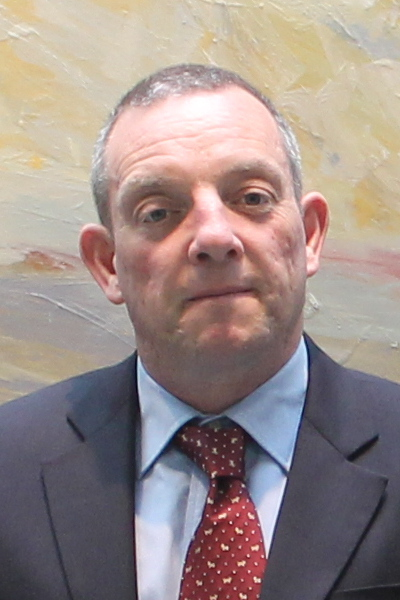

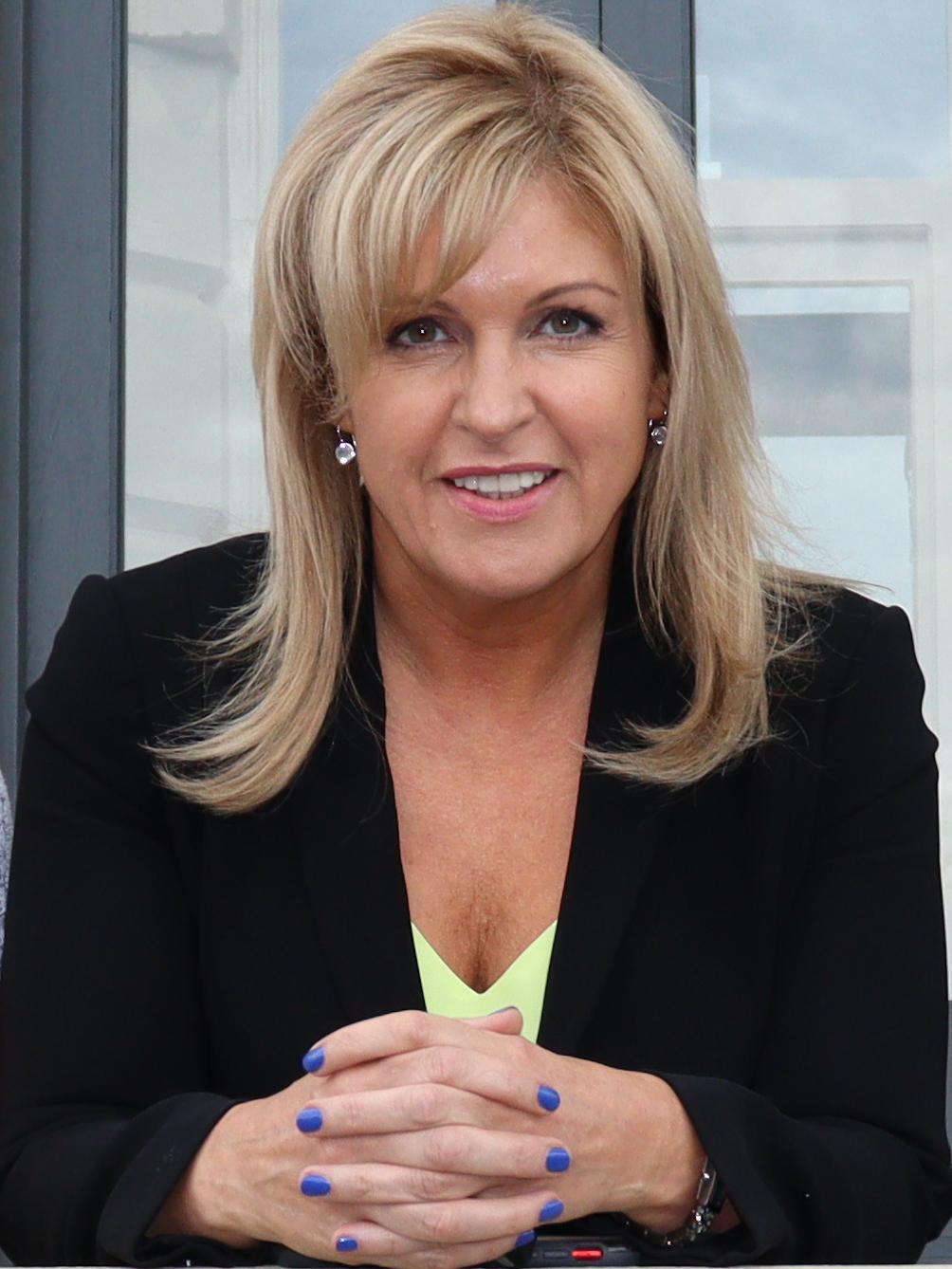

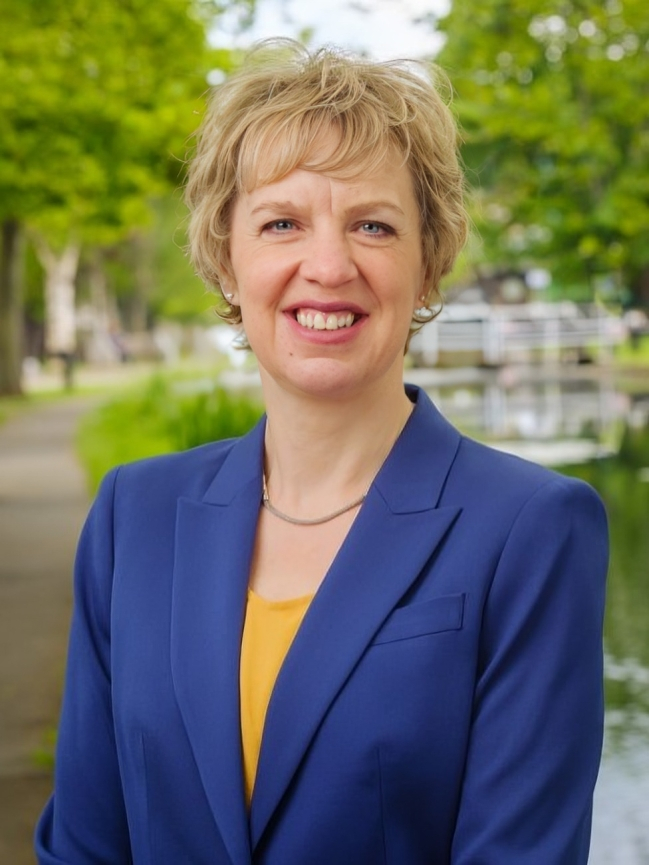

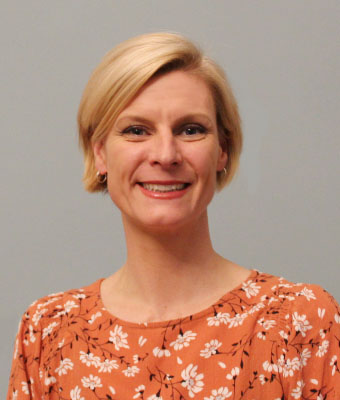

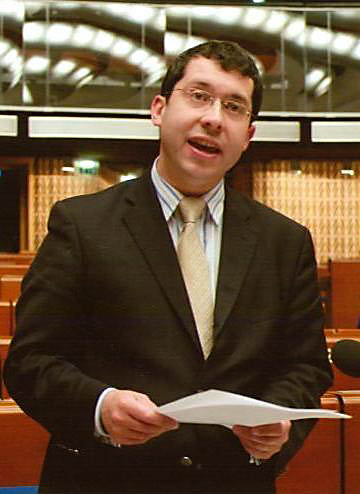
	First party	Second party	Third party
Leader	Catherine Ardagh	Jerry Buttimer	Rose Conway-Walsh
Party	Fianna Fáil	Fine Gael	Sinn Féin
Leader's seat	Industrial and Commercial Panel	Labour Panel	Agricultural Panel (elected to Dáil)
Last election	14 seats	13 seats	7 seats
Seats before	13	13	6
Seats won	16	12	5
Seat change	▲2	▼1	▼2
	Fourth party	Fifth party	Sixth party
Leader	Ivana Bacik	Pippa Hackett	Rónán Mullen
Party	Labour	Green	Human Dignity Alliance
Leader's seat	Dublin University	Agricultural Panel	National University
Last election	5 seats	1 seat	N/A
Seats before	5	1	1
Seats won	5	2	1
Seat change	0	▲1	new
Leader of the Seanad before election
Jerry Buttimer
Fine Gael
Elected Leader of the Seanad
Regina Doherty
Fine Gael

An indirect election to the 26th Seanad took place after the 2020 Irish general election, with postal ballots due on 30 and 31 March. Seanad Éireann is the upper house of the Oireachtas, with Dáil Éireann as the lower house of representatives. The election was held for 49 of the 60 seats in the Seanad: 43 are elected for five vocational panels, and six are elected in two university constituencies. The remaining 11 senators are nominated by the newly elected Taoiseach when the Dáil reconvenes after the general election.

== Background ==
The Constitution of Ireland provides that a Seanad election must take place within 90 days of the dissolution of the Dáil Éireann. As the Dáil was dissolved on 14 January, the latest day the election could take place is 13 April 2020. On 21 January 2020, the Minister for Housing, Planning and Local Government signed an order for the Seanad elections, providing 30 March as the deadline for ballots for the vocational panels and 31 March as the deadline for ballots in the university constituencies.

On 8 February 2020, the 33rd Dáil was elected in the general election. The Fine Gael-led government, led by Taoiseach Leo Varadkar was defeated, with Sinn Féin taking the most first preference votes, and Fianna Fáil taking the most seats. The Sinn Féin victory came as a surprise and an upset, as it ended the two-party rule of Fine Gael and Fianna Fáil that had existed for many decades, and polls did not show Sinn Féin winning until the election was called. Sinn Féin won 37 seats, Fianna Fáil won 38, and Fine Gael won 35.

== Electoral system ==
Of the forty-nine elected seats, three are elected from the university constituency of the National University and three are elected from the university constituency of Dublin University (Trinity College Dublin).

Forty-three are elected by an electorate of elected politicians, consisting of members of the 33rd Dáil, members of the 25th Seanad and city and county councillors, who each have five ballots for vocational panels. The Seanad Returning Officer maintains a list of qualified nominating bodies for each panel. Candidates may be nominated by nominating bodies (outside sub-panel) or by members of the Oireachtas (inside sub-panel). In each vocational panel, there is a minimum number who must be elected from either the inside or the outside sub-panel. If the number of candidates nominated for each sub-panel does not exceed by two the maximum number which may be elected from that sub-panel, the Taoiseach shall nominate candidates to fill the deficiency.

Electors for the Panels elect:

- Seven seats from the Administrative Panel, with a minimum of three from inside and outside sub-panels: Public administration and social services (including the voluntary sector).
- Eleven seats from the Agricultural Panel, with a minimum of four: Agriculture and the fisheries.
- Five seats from the Cultural and Educational Panel, with a minimum of two: Education, the arts, the Irish language and Irish culture and literature.
- Nine seats from the Industrial and Commercial Panel, with a minimum of three: Industry and commerce (including engineering and architecture).
- Eleven seats from the Labour Panel, with a minimum of four: Labour (organised or otherwise).

All votes are cast by postal ballot, and are counted using the single transferable vote. Under this system, voters can rank candidates in order of their preference, 1 as their first preference, 2 for second preference, and so on. Ballots are initially given a value of 1,000 to allow calculation of quotas where all ballots are distributed in the case of a surplus, rather than taking a representative sample as is done in Dáil elections. The quota for election is given as $\left( \frac{\text{total valid poll}}{ \text{seats}+1 } \right) + 1$. (Note: To facilitate transfer of fractional surpluses, each valid ballot paper is given a value of 1,000.)

The 11 nominated members can only be appointed by the Taoiseach who is appointed next after the reassembly of Dáil Éireann. They are usually appointed after the Seanad election, but if a Taoiseach has not been appointed at stage, they will not be appointed until then.

== Members of the outgoing Seanad not seeking election ==
Date confirmed	Constituency	Departing senator	Party	Reason
21 January 2020	Nominated by the Taoiseach	Collette Kelleher	Independent	Retirement
8 February 2020	Agricultural Panel	Rose Conway-Walsh	Sinn Féin	Elected to 33rd Dáil
8 February 2020	Cultural and Educational Panel	Kieran O'Donnell	Fine Gael	Elected to 33rd Dáil
8 February 2020	Industrial and Commercial Panel	Colm Burke	Fine Gael	Elected to 33rd Dáil
8 February 2020	Industrial and Commercial Panel	Pádraig Mac Lochlainn	Sinn Féin	Elected to 33rd Dáil
8 February 2020	Industrial and Commercial Panel	Aodhán Ó Ríordáin	Labour	Elected to 33rd Dáil
8 February 2020	Labour Panel	Jennifer Murnane O'Connor	Fianna Fáil	Elected to 33rd Dáil
8 February 2020	Labour Panel	Ged Nash	Labour	Elected to 33rd Dáil
8 February 2020	Labour Panel	Neale Richmond	Fine Gael	Elected to 33rd Dáil
8 February 2020	Nominated by the Taoiseach	Frank Feighan	Fine Gael	Elected to 33rd Dáil
27 March 2020	Cultural and Educational Panel	Keith Swanick	Fianna Fáil	Expenses controversy
16 December 2019	Nominated by the Taoiseach	Paudie Coffey	Fine Gael	Retirement

== Election process ==
Timetable of 2020 Seanad election
Deadline	Universities	Vocational Panel
Nominations close	14 February	24 February ("outside" panel: nominating bodies — civic society groups); 2 March ("inside" panel: Oireachtas members)
Completion of panels (Note: One nominated candidate was excluded and one extra candidate was added by the Taoiseach at this stage.)	n/a	9 March
Ballot papers distributed	28 February	16 March
Polls close	31 March, 11 a.m.	30 March, 11 a.m.

=== Impact of coronavirus ===
Because of the coronavirus outbreak, changes to the usual arrangements for the Vocational Panel elections were made to reduce the risk of transmission. The clerk and deputy clerk of the Dáil and Seanad refused to witness Oireachtas members' ballots, advising them to use the local government chief executive or Garda (police) superintendent for this purpose. The Seanad clerk, as returning officer, also requested that counting agents not be present at the count centre in Dublin Castle. Similar appeals were made regarding the NUI count in the RDS and the Dublin University count in the university's Examination Hall.

== Results ==
=== National University of Ireland ===
2020 Seanad election: National University
Party	Candidate	FPv%	Count															
Party	Candidate	FPv%	1	2	3	4	5	6	7	8	9	10	11	12	13	14	15	16
Independent	Rónán Mullen	25.2	9,642															
Independent	Michael McDowell	23.4	8,951	9,001	9,032	9,066	9,104	9,165	9,231	9,322	9,364	9,532						
Independent	Alice-Mary Higgins	12.9	4,944	4,953	4,962	4,972	4,995	5,024	5,060	5,103	5,145	5,271	5,400	5,723	6,156	6,710	7,487	9,778
Solidarity	Ruth Coppinger	9.5	3,615	3,619	3,625	3,630	3,650	3,677	3,697	3,715	3,753	3,851	3,962	4,168	4,363	4,804	5,196	6,219
Labour	Laura Harmon	5.7	2,187	2,189	2,194	2,204	2,227	2,252	2,279	2,310	2,385	2,470	2,563	2,721	3,072	3,385	4,333	
Independent	Michelle Healy	4.0	1,540	1,544	1,548	1,576	1,596	1,622	1,656	1,689	1,737	1,893	2,292	2,460	2,761	3,074		
Independent	Rory Hearne	3.5	1,321	1,328	1,332	1,353	1,367	1,401	1,428	1,475	1,514	1,555	1,622	1,776	1,949			
Green	Eva Dowling	3.2	1,229	1,231	1,247	1,259	1,284	1,298	1,329	1,354	1,400	1,459	1,497	1,622				
Independent	Brendan Price	2.9	1,090	1,097	1,101	1,110	1,120	1,142	1,179	1,195	1,205	1,294	1,378					
Independent	Mick Finn	2.4	908	913	919	922	942	957	963	981	994	1,079						
Independent	Anne Staunton Barrett	1.2	446	451	454	455	462	478	499	515	524							
Independent	Jennifer Butler	1.0	366	367	371	374	394	401	412	418	451							
Independent	Karen Devine	0.9	359	361	363	366	375	385	397	405								
Independent	Peter Finnegan	0.9	346	352	354	360	365	380	391									
Independent	Keith Scanlon	0.8	309	311	322	340	351	365										
Independent	Garbhan Downey	0.8	305	309	315	321	334											
Independent	Abbas Ali O'Shea	0.7	254	255	258	264												
Independent	Marcus Matthews	0.5	176	177	182													
Independent	Eoin Delahunty	0.3	130	130														
Electorate: 112,216 Valid: 38,118 Spoilt: 91 Quota: 9,530 Turnout: 34.1%

=== Dublin University ===
2020 Seanad election: Dublin University
Party	Candidate	FPv%	Count							
Party	Candidate	FPv%	1	2	3	4	5	6	7	8
Independent	David Norris	24.2	3,646	3,671	3,728	3,768				
Labour	Ivana Bacik	23.2	3,489	3,521	3,542	3,571	3,574	3,963		
Independent	Lynn Ruane	18.4	2,780	2,805	2,825	2,870	2,871	3,229	3,348	4,072
Independent	Hugo MacNeill	13.5	2,038	2,050	2,081	2,133	2,133	2,299	2,342	2,961
Independent	Tom Clonan	9.3	1,394	1,417	1,440	1,492	1,493	1,682	1,722	
Green	William Priestley	7.2	1,090	1,104	1,119	1,175	1,177			
Independent	Keith Scanlon	1.8	276	285	297					
Independent	Joseph O'Gorman	1.2	180	183						
Independent	Abbas Ali O'Shea	0.5	81							
Independent	Derek Byrne	0.4	67							
Electorate: Approx. 65,000 Valid: 15,041 Spoilt: 12 Quota: 3,761 Turnout: Approx. 23.1%

=== Administrative Panel ===
2020 Seanad election: Administrative Panel
Party	Candidate	FPv%	Count																	
Party	Candidate	FPv%	1	2	3	4	5	6	7	8	9	10	11	12	13	14	15	16	17	18
Fianna Fáil	Mark Daly	14.7	167,000	141,751																
Sinn Féin	Niall Ó Donnghaile	10.6	120,000	120,153	120,153	120,153	120,153	120,153	120,153	121,153	121,153	121,153	121,153	121,153	132,306	133,080	133,080	133,080	133,080	141,845
Labour	Rebecca Moynihan	9.2	104,000	104,153	105,153	105,153	105,153	106,153	115,153	120,306	120,459	120,459	125,459	125,459	129,612	129,612	132,612	134,612	140,735	164,735
Fianna Fáil	Diarmuid Wilson	8.8	100,000	104,131	105,131	106,131	106,131	111,896	112,896	116,049	125,732	125,732	144,027	141,751						
Fine Gael	Garret Ahearn	7.9	90,000	90,000	90,000	90,000	90,000	90,000	90,000	91,000	92,000	109,000	110,000	110,000	111,000	111,000	152,000	141,751		
Fine Gael	Martin Conway	7.9	90,000	90,153	90,153	90,153	90,153	90,153	91,153	94,306	94,612	109,765	112,765	112,765	116,765	116,765	149,765	149,765	141,751	
Fianna Fáil	Fiona O'Loughlin	7.1	81,000	86,508	86,508	86,508	87,508	94,661	94,661	95,661	108,803	108,803	130,251	132,525	142,525	141,751				
Independent	Thomas Welby	7.0	79,000	80,683	80,683	80,683	82,142	83,295	84,295	87,754	92,907	95,060	96,366	96,366	108,519	108,519	113,519	115,519	117,403	
Fine Gael	Emer Currie	5.6	64,000	64,000	64,000	64,000	66,000	66,000	68,000	68,000	69,000	81,000	83,000	83,000	85,000	85,000				
Fine Gael	Noel Rock	3.8	44,000	44,306	44,306	44,306	44,306	45,306	46,306	47,306	47,306									
Fianna Fáil	Mick Cahill	3.6	41,000	44,978	44,978	44,978	44,978	51,437	52,437	52,590	57,202	57,202								
Independent	John Bosco Conama	2.9	33,000	33,306	36,306	41,306	42,306	42,306	46,306	55,612	57,765	57,765	60,765	60,765						
Fianna Fáil	Lorraine Clifford-Lee	2.6	30,000	34,743	34,743	34,743	35,743	38,202	38,202	38,355										
Fianna Fáil	Joe Malone	2.0	23,000	24,836	24,989	24,989	25,142													
Independent	John Dolan	1.9	22,000	23,377	23,377	25,377	26,377	26,377	31,530											
Independent	Anne Marie Flanagan	1.9	22,000	22,153	22,153	22,153	25,153	25,306												
Independent	Tony Geoghegan	0.9	10,000	10,612	10,612	11,612														
Independent	Timothy Hogan	0.8	9,000	9,000	9,000															
Independent	Salome Mbugua Henry	0.4	5,000	5,153																
Electorate: 1,169 Valid: 1,134,000 Quota: 141,751 Turnout: 97.0%

=== Agricultural Panel ===
2020 Seanad election: Agricultural Panel
Party	Candidate	FPv%	Count																			
Party	Candidate	FPv%	1	2	3	4	5	6	7	8	9	10	11	12	13	14	15	16	17	18	19	20
Independent	Victor Boyhan	7.9	89,000	89,000	91,000	91,000	94,000	96,000	94,167													
Fianna Fáil	Denis O'Donovan	7.3	83,000	84,000	84,000	84,000	84,000	85,000	85,000	90,000	92,000	105,000	94,167									
Sinn Féin	Lynn Boylan	7.1	80,000	80,000	80,000	80,000	80,000	80,000	80,000	81,000	82,000	82,000	82,000	82,000	83,000	83,000	83,000	83,000	83,000	83,000	83,000	83,000
Green	Pippa Hackett	6.7	76,000	76,000	76,000	76,000	77,000	77,000	77,000	77,000	79,000	81,000	81,000	81,000	81,000	82,000	82,916	82,916	82,916	84,916	91,916	95,832
Fianna Fáil	Paul Daly	6.3	71,000	71,000	71,000	71,000	71,000	71,000	71,000	71,000	73,000	76,000	76,833	77,833	85,833	86,833	96,833	94,167				
Sinn Féin	Gerry Murray	5.9	67,000	68,000	68,000	68,000	69,000	70,000	70,000	70,000	70,000	70,000	70,000	70,000	71,000	72,000	73,000	73,000	73,000	74,000	75,000	75,979
Fine Gael	Paddy Burke	5.6	63,000	63,000	64,000	64,000	64,000	65,000	65,000	66,000	69,000	71,000	71,000	77,000	80,000	89,000	90,000	90,000	90,000	102,000	102,000	94,167
Labour	Annie Hoey	5.6	63,000	63,000	63,000	70,000	71,000	71,000	71,000	71,000	73,000	73,000	73,000	73,000	75,916	77,916	82,916	83,249	83,249	86,249	91,249	94,186
Fianna Fáil	Niall Blaney	5.2	58,000	58,000	58,000	58,000	59,000	61,000	61,000	63,000	63,000	66,000	68,499	68,499	79,499	79,499	94,332	94,332	94,167			
Fine Gael	Tim Lombard	4.9	56,000	57,000	57,000	57,000	58,000	59,000	59,000	59,000	59,000	60,000	61,666	69,666	70,666	82,666	85,666	85,666	85,666	108,666	94,167	
Fine Gael	Maria Byrne	4.2	48,000	48,000	48,000	48,000	48,000	48,000	48,000	48,000	50,000	50,000	50,000	56,000	57,000	68,000	68,000	68,000	68,000			
Fine Gael	Michael W. D'Arcy	4.2	48,000	48,000	48,000	48,000	50,000	50,000	50,000	50,000	51,000	51,000	51,000	62,000	62,000	76,000	78,000	78,000	78,000	96,000	96,000	96,000
Fianna Fáil	Eugene Murphy	3.9	44,000	44,000	44,000	45,000	45,000	46,000	46,000	48,000	48,000	57,000	58,666	58,666	70,499	71,499	91,165	93,496	93,661	94,661	94,661	94,661
Fine Gael	Aisling Dolan	3.7	42,000	42,000	43,000	43,000	44,000	44,000	44,000	45,000	47,000	47,000	47,000	54,000	54,000							
Independent	Brian Ó Domhnaill	3.6	41,000	41,000	41,000	41,000	41,000	41,000	41,916	44,916	50,916	50,916	51,749	51,749								
Fianna Fáil	Shane P. O'Reilly	3.5	40,000	40,000	40,000	40,000	40,000	44,000	44,916	45,916	46,916	50,916	54,248	54,248	60,248	60,248						
Fine Gael	Pat Deering	3.4	39,000	39,000	39,000	39,000	39,000	39,000	39,000	39,000	40,000	40,000	40,000									
Fianna Fáil	Kevin O'Keeffe	2.9	33,000	33,000	33,000	33,000	33,000	33,000	33,000	35,000	37,000											
Independent	Dermot Cantillon	2.4	27,000	27,000	27,000	27,000	27,000	27,000	27,000	30,000												
Fianna Fáil	Tom McEllistrim	1.9	22,000	22,000	22,000	22,000	22,000	22,000	22,000													
Fianna Fáil	Seamus Coyle	1.1	13,000	13,000	13,000	13,000	13,000															
Independent	Ian Marshall	0.9	10,000	10,000	10,000	11,000																
Labour	Dominic Hannigan	0.8	9,000	9,000	9,000																	
Independent	Richard Mulcahy	0.4	4,000	4,000																		
Independent	Patrick Kent	0.4	4,000																			
Electorate: 1,169 Valid: 1,133,000 Quota: 94,167 Turnout: 96.9%

=== Cultural and Educational Panel ===
2020 Seanad election: Cultural and Educational Panel
Party	Candidate	FPv%	Count																	
Party	Candidate	FPv%	1	2	3	4	5	6	7	8	9	10	11	12	13	14	15	16	17	18
Sinn Féin	Fintan Warfield	13.3	151,000	151,000	151,000	152,000	152,000	152,000	154,000	154,000	154,000	156,000	156,000	156,000	157,000	176,000	176,000	180,000	180,000	180,000
Green	Saoirse McHugh	10.1	114,000	115,000	115,000	118,000	119,000	120,000	122,000	122,000	122,000	123,000	126,000	131,000	132,000	152,000	152,000	158,000	159,000	159,776
Fine Gael	John McGahon	9.0	102,000	102,000	102,000	102,000	103,000	106,000	106,000	112,000	112,000	113,000	134,000	134,000	175,000	177,000	177,000	183,000	183,000	183,388
Fianna Fáil	Lisa Chambers	8.7	99,000	99,000	101,000	101,000	102,000	104,000	105,000	105,000	112,000	120,000	121,000	141,000	144,000	155,000	156,000	190,000	190,000	188,834
Fine Gael	Seán Kyne	7.2	82,000	82,000	82,000	82,000	82,000	91,000	96,000	101,000	101,000	101,000	124,000	127,000	180,000	192,000	188,834			
Independent	Joe Conway	6.9	78,000	79,000	80,000	81,000	81,000	82,000	89,000	91,000	92,000	98,000	98,000	105,000	108,000					
Fianna Fáil	Malcolm Byrne	6.3	71,000	72,000	73,000	74,000	77,000	77,000	78,000	79,000	89,000	103,000	103,000	122,000	122,000	146,000	146,000	190,000	188,834	
Fine Gael	Tom Neville	6.2	70,000	70,000	70,000	70,000	70,000	76,000	76,000	88,000	89,000	90,000	103,000	105,000						
Fianna Fáil	Margaret Murphy O'Mahony	5.5	62,000	63,000	63,000	65,000	66,000	66,000	68,000	68,000	76,000	94,000	95,000	108,000	110,000	118,000	118,000			
Fianna Fáil	Kate Feeney	5.1	58,000	58,000	58,000	58,000	59,000	59,000	59,000	59,000	65,000	69,000	69,000							
Fine Gael	Gabrielle McFadden	4.8	54,000	54,000	54,000	54,000	54,000	55,000	56,000	62,000	62,000	62,000								
Fianna Fáil	Declan Breathnach	3.4	39,000	40,000	42,000	42,000	43,000	43,000	49,000	49,000	58,000									
Fianna Fáil	Shane Curley	3.4	38,000	38,000	38,000	38,000	39,000	41,000	43,000	43,000										
Fine Gael	Mary Newman Julian	2.7	31,000	31,000	31,000	31,000	31,000	32,000	32,000											
Aontú	Paul Lawless	2.6	29,000	29,000	29,000	29,000	29,000	29,000												
Fine Gael	Michael Maher	2.3	26,000	26,000	26,000	26,000	26,000													
Fianna Fáil	Deirdre Conroy	0.9	10,000	10,000	10,000	10,000														
Social Democrats	Angela Flynn	0.7	8,000	8,000	8,000															
Independent	Éamonn Walsh	0.5	6,000	6,000																
Independent	Jack Mulcahy	0.4	5,000																	
Electorate: 1,169 Valid: 1,133,000 Quota: 188,834 Turnout: 96.9%

=== Industrial and Commercial Panel ===
2020 Seanad election: Industrial and Commercial Panel
Party	Candidate	FPv%	Count																														
Party	Candidate	FPv%	1	2	3	4	5	6	7	8	9	10	11	12	13	14	15	16	17	18	19	20	21	22	23	24	25	26	27	28	29	30	31
Sinn Féin	Elisha McCallion	8.4	95,000	95,000	95,000	95,000	95,000	95,000	95,000	95,000	95,000	95,000	95,000	95,000	95,000	95,000	95,000	95,000	95,000	95,000	95,000	95,000	95,000	95,000	95,000	95,000	95,000	95,000	95,000	95,000	95,000	96,000	99,000
Social Democrats	Niall Ó Tuathail	7.8	88,000	88,000	88,000	88,000	88,000	88,000	88,000	88,000	88,000	88,000	88,000	88,000	88,000	88,000	88,000	88,000	88,000	88,000	89,000	89,000	89,000	90,000	90,000	90,000	90,000	93,000	93,000	93,000	93,000	93,000	
Labour	Mark Wall	7.4	84,000	84,000	84,000	84,000	85,000	85,000	85,000	85,000	85,000	85,000	85,000	87,000	87,000	87,000	88,000	88,000	88,000	88,000	88,000	88,000	89,000	90,000	92,000	92,000	92,099	94,099	94,099	94,099	94,099	112,812	129,812
Fianna Fáil	Aidan Davitt	6.9	78,000	78,000	78,000	78,000	78,000	78,000	79,000	79,000	79,000	79,000	81,000	81,000	81,000	81,000	81,000	82,000	83,000	83,000	90,000	96,000	97,000	107,000	108,000	108,000	108,000	114,000	113,501				
Independent	Frances Black	6.7	76,000	76,000	76,000	76,000	77,000	77,000	77,000	77,000	77,000	78,000	78,000	80,000	80,000	81,000	81,000	83,000	83,000	87,000	89,000	94,000	94,000	97,000	97,000	97,000	97,000	101,000	101,099	101,099	101,348	111,348	168,348
Fianna Fáil	Ollie Crowe	5.6	64,000	64,000	64,000	64,000	64,000	65,000	65,000	65,000	65,000	66,000	66,000	66,000	66,000	67,000	67,000	78,000	78,000	78,000	86,000	91,000	93,000	101,000	101,000	101,000	101,000	114,000	114,000	113,501			
Fianna Fáil	Catherine Ardagh	5.5	62,000	62,000	62,000	62,000	62,000	62,000	62,000	62,000	62,000	62,000	62,000	62,000	63,000	63,000	64,000	68,000	68,000	68,000	72,000	73,000	73,000	85,000	86,000	86,000	86,000	114,000	114,000	114,000	113,501		
Independent	Sharon Keogan	4.3	49,000	49,000	49,000	49,000	49,000	49,000	49,000	49,000	49,000	53,000	53,000	53,000	53,000	53,000	53,000	54,000	55,000	55,000	55,000	76,000	78,000	81,000	82,000	82,000	82,000	85,000	85,396	85,895	86,144	94,144	101,144
Fine Gael	Micheál Carrigy	4.1	47,000	47,000	47,000	47,000	47,000	47,000	49,000	50,000	51,000	51,000	54,000	55,000	57,000	63,000	73,000	73,000	83,000	89,000	90,000	91,000	108,000	108,000	116,000	113,501							
Fianna Fáil	Gerry Horkan	3.7	42,000	42,000	42,000	42,000	42,000	42,000	42,000	42,000	42,000	42,000	43,000	44,000	44,000	44,000	44,000	50,000	50,000	50,000	54,000	55,000	56,000	66,000	66,000	66,000	66,000						
Fine Gael	Tom Sheahan	3.6	41,000	41,000	41,000	41,000	41,000	41,000	43,000	46,000	46,000	46,000	47,000	48,000	48,000	48,000	51,000	51,000	53,000	57,000	59,000	61,000	66,000	67,000	81,000	83,496	83,892	84,892	84,892	84,892	84,892		
Independent	Nigel Dineen	3.1	35,000	35,000	35,000	35,000	35,000	35,000	35,000	35,000	35,000	40,000	40,000	40,000	41,000	43,000	43,000	43,000	43,000	44,000	45,000												
Fianna Fáil	Timmy Dooley	3.1	35,000	35,000	35,000	35,000	35,000	37,000	39,000	39,000	39,000	41,000	41,000	42,000	42,000	42,000	42,000	45,000	47,000	47,000	50,000	52,000	52,000										
Fine Gael	John Paul O'Shea	2.8	32,000	32,000	32,000	32,000	32,000	32,000	32,000	32,000	34,000	34,000	35,000	37,000	37,000	37,000	38,000	38,000	41,000	48,000	49,000	49,000	56,000	57,000									
Fianna Fáil	Tom MacSharry	2.7	31,000	31,000	31,000	31,000	31,000	31,000	31,000	31,000	31,000	32,000	32,000	32,000	32,000	33,000	33,000	34,000	34,000	34,000													
Fine Gael	Barry Ward	2.6	30,000	30,000	30,000	30,000	30,000	30,000	30,000	33,000	38,000	38,000	42,000	48,000	53,000	56,000	62,000	62,000	69,000	75,000	75,000	75,000	85,000	85,000	114,000	114,000	113,501						
Fianna Fáil	Arthur Griffin	2.6	29,000	29,000	29,000	29,000	29,000	29,000	29,000	29,000	29,000	29,000	29,000	29,000	29,000	29,000																	
Fine Gael	Sharon Tolan	2.2	25,000	25,000	25,000	25,000	25,000	25,000	25,000	26,000	26,000	26,000	27,000	27,000	30,000	30,000	30,000	30,000															
Fine Gael	Garret Kelleher	2.1	24,000	24,000	24,000	24,000	24,000	24,000	24,000	24,000	25,000	25,000	26,000	29,000	29,000	31,000	34,000	34,000	34,000														
Fine Gael	Patrick Connor-Scarteen	2.0	23,000	23,000	23,000	23,000	23,000	23,000	23,000	24,000	24,000	24,000	26,000	26,000	32,000	33,000	37,000	37,000	41,000	46,000	46,000	47,000											
Fine Gael	Patsy O'Brien	1.8	20,000	20,000	20,000	20,000	20,000	20,000	20,000	20,000	20,000	21,000	22,000	22,000	22,000																		
Fine Gael	Danny Byrne	1.6	18,000	18,000	18,000	18,000	18,000	18,000	19,000	19,000	19,000	19,000	19,000	19,000																			
Fine Gael	Catherine Noone	1.6	18,000	18,000	18,000	18,000	18,000	18,000	18,000	19,000	21,000	22,000	24,000	24,000	25,000	29,000																	
Fine Gael	Edward Timmins	1.6	18,000	18,000	18,000	18,000	18,000	18,000	18,000	18,000	19,000	19,000	19,000																				
Fine Gael	James Geoghegan	1.5	17,000	17,000	17,000	17,000	17,000	17,000	17,000	17,000	18,000	19,000																					
Independent	Pat Hynes	1.5	17,000	17,000	17,000	17,000	17,000	17,000	17,000	17,000	17,000																						
Fine Gael	Emma Blain	1.2	14,000	14,000	14,000	14,000	14,000	14,000	14,000	14,000																							
Fine Gael	Linda O'Shea Farren	0.9	10,000	10,000	10,000	10,000	10,000	10,000	10,000																								
Fine Gael	Áine Collins	0.7	8,000	8,000	8,000	8,000	8,000	8,000																									
Independent	Michael Vaughan	0.3	3,000	3,000	3,000	3,000	3,000																										
Independent	Joe Corr	0.2	2,000	2,000	2,000	2,000																											
Independent	Patrick Hunt	0.0	0	0	0																												
Independent	Patrick Kinsella	0.0	0	0																													
Independent	Declan Allen	0.0	0																														
Electorate: 1,169 Valid: 1,135,000 Quota: 113,501 Turnout: 97.1%

=== Labour Panel ===
2020 Seanad election: Labour Panel
Party	Candidate	FPv%	Count																
Party	Candidate	FPv%	1	2	3	4	5	6	7	8	9	10	11	12	13	14	15	16	17
Fine Gael	Jerry Buttimer	9.3	105,000	94,417															
Fine Gael	John Cummins	8.1	92,000	97,353	94,417														
Fianna Fáil	Robbie Gallagher	7.3	83,000	83,000	83,000	83,000	84,000	85,000	89,000	97,000	94,417								
Green	Pauline O'Reilly	7.1	80,000	80,000	80,056	80,056	81,056	81,056	81,056	81,056	81,056	81,056	82,112	83,750	88,569	92,569	93,363	94,194	94,194
Independent	Gerard Craughwell	7.0	79,000	79,505	79,505	80,505	82,505	83,505	84,505	84,505	84,505	87,505	88,718	91,175	95,632	95,632	95,632	95,632	94,417
Labour	Marie Sherlock	7.0	79,000	79,303	79,303	79,303	79,303	79,303	80,303	80,303	80,303	81,303	82,112	84,949	86,949	87,949	87,949	87,949	89,164
Independent	Eileen Flynn	6.7	76,000	76,000	76,000	76,000	79,000	82,000	82,000	82,000	82,000	85,000	86,056	86,056	86,157	86,157	86,157	86,988	86,988
Fine Gael	Joe O'Reilly	6.4	73,000	75,525	77,429	77,429	77,429	77,429	79,530	79,530	79,530	80,530	107,530	94,417					
Sinn Féin	Paul Gavan	6.3	72,000	72,000	72,000	72,000	72,000	87,000	87,000	87,000	87,000	87,000	88,000	88,819	88,819	88,819	90,407	90,407	90,407
Fianna Fáil	Shane Cassells	6.2	70,000	70,000	70,000	70,000	70,000	70,101	74,101	76,101	76,745	82,745	83,902	84,721	103,721	94,417			
Fianna Fáil	Ned O'Sullivan	5.9	67,000	67,303	67,359	67,359	67,359	67,359	69,359	71,359	71,681	75,003	77,261	78,080	96,080	96,080	96,080	94,417	
Fianna Fáil	Pat Casey	4.9	56,000	56,101	56,157	56,157	56,157	56,157	56,157	61,157	61,801	72,801	77,801	77,801	96,801	96,801	94,417		
Fianna Fáil	Aengus O'Rourke	4.0	47,000	47,000	47,000	47,000	47,000	47,000	58,000	63,000	63,000	68,101	68,202	71,478					
Fine Gael	Mary Seery-Kearney	3.6	41,000	42,111	42,895	42,895	42,895	42,895	42,895	42,895	42,895	43,895							
Independent	Michael Smyth	2.7	31,000	31,101	31,101	31,101	31,101	31,101	31,101	38,101	39,067								
Fianna Fáil	John Hanafin	2.5	28,000	28,000	28,000	28,000	28,000	28,000	29,000										
Fianna Fáil	Orla Leyden	2.3	26,000	26,101	26,157	26,157	26,157	26,157											
Sinn Féin	Máire Devine	1.8	20,000	20,101	20,101	20,101	20,101												
Independent	Sarah Walshe	0.5	6,000	6,000	6,000	7,000													
Independent	Martina Harkin-Kelly	0.2	2,000	2,000	2,000														
Electorate: 1,169 Valid: 1,133,000 Quota: 94,417 Turnout: 96.7%
