= 2004 Wicklow County Council election =

Part of the 2004 Irish local elections

- 11 June 2004

All 24 seats on Wicklow County Council
	First party	Second party	Third party
Party	Fine Gael	Fianna Fáil	Labour
Seats won	7	6	6
Seat change	+1	-2	+1
	Fourth party	Fifth party
Party	Green	Independent
Seats won	1	4
Seat change	-	-
- Map showing the area of Wicklow County Council
Council control after election
TBD

An election to Wicklow County Council took place on 11 June 2004 as part of that year's Irish local elections. 24 councillors were elected from five local electoral areas (LEAs) for a five-year term of office on the electoral system of proportional representation by means of the single transferable vote (PR-STV).

== Results by party ==
Party	Seats	±	First Pref. votes	FPv%	±%
Fine Gael	7	+1	11,695	21.99	
Fianna Fáil	6	-2	13,394	25.18	
Labour	6	+1	11,661	21.92	
Green	1	-	2,490	4.68	
Independent	4	-	8,535	16.05	
Totals	24	-	53,186	100.00	—

== Results by local electoral area ==
=== Arklow ===
Arklow - 5 seats
Party	Candidate	FPv%	Count						
Party	Candidate	FPv%	1	2	3	4	5	6	7
Labour	Nicky Kelly*	28.00	3,398						
Fianna Fáil	Dr. Bill O'Connell*	12.81	1,555	1,962	1,977	2,030			
Fine Gael	Vincent Blake*	12.41	1,506	1,553	1,640	1,661	1,693	1,818	1,919
Fianna Fáil	Pat Doran*	11.26	1,367	1,410	1,459	1,475	1,516	1,801	1,839
Labour	Kevin Ryan	8.48	1,029	1,212	1,243	1,321	1,448	1,520	1,622
Fine Gael	Sylvester Bourke*	7.65	929	1,130	1,147	1,198	1,264	1,364	1,838
Fianna Fáil	Liam O'Loughlin	5.81	705	758	769	786	817		
Fine Gael	Donal O'Sullivan	5.17	628	833	834	889	957	1,022	
Sinn Féin	Adrian O'Reilly	3.72	452	589	597	654			
Green	Tess Enright	2.64	321	414	432				
Progressive Democrats	John Deegan	2.04	247	253					
Electorate: 18,837 Valid: 12,137 (64.43%) Spoilt: 222 Quota: 2,023 Turnout: 12,359 (65.61%)

=== Baltinglass ===
Baltinglass - 3 seats
Party	Candidate	FPv%	Count									
Party	Candidate	FPv%	1	2	3	4	5	6	7	8	9	10
Independent	Tommy Cullen*	22.91	1,832	1,856	1,883	1,893	1,918	1,948	2,041			
Independent	Jim Ruttle*	17.00	1,359	1,378	1,424	1,465	1,508	1,565	1,619	1,628	1,785	2,105
Fine Gael	Edward Timmins*	14.42	1,153	1,163	1,178	1,181	1,358	1,375	1,480	1,495	1,709	1,846
Progressive Democrats	Eileen Cullen	9.93	794	805	847	870	877	940	998	1,006	1,122	1,351
Sinn Féin	Gerry O'Neill	8.64	691	698	731	792	794	835	871	875	972	
Fianna Fáil	Ina O'Keeffe	7.09	567	570	576	623	641	781	835	841		
Fianna Fáil	Joe McCormac	4.29	343	353	367	417	417					
Labour	Mary Lee Stapleton	4.17	333	377	397	398	438	469				
Fine Gael	John Timmins	4.00	320	322	326	327						
Fianna Fáil	Mick O'Connell	2.94	235	236	249							
Independent	Assumpta Byrne	2.71	217	230								
Green	Pat Pidgeon	1.89	151									
Electorate: 12,204 Valid: 7,995 (65.51%) Spoilt: 103 Quota: 1,999 Turnout: 8,098 (66.36%)

=== Bray ===
Bray - 7 seats
Party	Candidate	FPv%	Count										
Party	Candidate	FPv%	1	2	3	4	5	6	7	8	9	10	11
Labour	John Byrne*	12.63	1,807										
Green	Déirdre de Búrca*	11.45	1,638	1,643	1,657	1,720	1,781	1,782	1,839				
Fianna Fáil	Joe Behan*	11.32	1,620	1,627	1,634	1,645	1,677	1,679	1,693	1,704	1,939		
Independent	Christopher Fox*	11.14	1,594	1,601	1,607	1,642	1,698	1,699	1,898				
Fianna Fáil	Pat Vance*	8.95	1,280	1,291	1,301	1,333	1,376	1,377	1,392	1,409	1,528	1,574	1,667
Labour	Anne Ferris*	8.47	1,212	1,219	1,236	1,279	1,313	1,321	1,392	1,402	1,452	1,466	1,735
Sinn Féin	Marie Gavaghan	6.91	988	990	997	1,013	1,023	1,024	1,035	1,043	1,058	1,064	
Fine Gael	John Ryan	6.83	977	1,040	1,119	1,156	1,219	1,220	1,415	1,452	1,504	1,517	1,584
Fianna Fáil	Michael Lawlor*	6.58	941	949	960	970	1,007	1,008	1,037	1,058	1,183	1,254	1,341
Fianna Fáil	David Grant	4.37	625	630	633	641	665	666	674	679			
Fine Gael	John Byrne	4.05	580	598	630	634	653	654					
Progressive Democrats	Ruairi Hanley	2.84	406	410	413	421							
Independent	Seay Ledwidge	1.99	285	290	293								
Fine Gael	Brian Kenny	1.31	188	205									
Fine Gael	P.J. Minogue	1.16	166										
Electorate: 26,906 Valid: 14,307 (53.17%) Spoilt: 328 Quota: 1,789 Turnout: 14,635 (54.39%)

=== Greystones ===
Greystones - 4 seats
Party	Candidate	FPv%	Count							
Party	Candidate	FPv%	1	2	3	4	5	6	7	8
Fine Gael	George Jones*	14.74	1,188	1,195	1,214	1,305	1,334	1,436	1,491	1,636
Fine Gael	Derek Mitchell*	13.42	1,082	1,095	1,121	1,211	1,255	1,308	1,352	1,425
Labour	Tom Fortune	12.19	983	1,011	1,057	1,126	1,244	1,298	1,552	1,668
Fianna Fáil	Kathleen Kelleher	11.13	897	906	932	944	962	1,052	1,110	1,501
Fianna Fáil	Eleanor Roche*	10.11	815	821	841	864	878	917	1,009	
Sinn Féin	David Gahan	9.08	732	769	789	836	870	915		
Independent	Veronica O'Reilly*	8.32	671	679	703	733	791	945	1,113	1,235
Independent	Chris Maloney	6.36	513	532	559	568	601			
Green	Francis Neary	4.71	380	394	411	418				
Fine Gael	John Toner	4.60	371	386	400					
Independent	Niall Byrne	3.05	246	252						
Independent	Charlie Keddy	2.28	184							
Electorate: 14,127 Valid: 8,062 (57.07%) Spoilt: 138 Quota: 1,613 Turnout: 8,200 (58.04%)

=== Wicklow ===
Wicklow - 5 seats
Party	Candidate	FPv%	Count						
Party	Candidate	FPv%	1	2	3	4	5	6	7
Fine Gael	Andrew Doyle*	18.19	2,008						
Labour	Jimmy O'Shaughnessy*	15.82	1,746	1,781	1,809	1,838	1,896		
Fianna Fáil	Fachtna Whittle	11.44	1,262	1,272	1,301	1,371	1,412	1,537	1,731
Fianna Fáil	Pat Doyle*	10.71	1,182	1,203	1,221	1,256	1,274	1,321	1,385
Labour	Conal Kavanagh*	10.45	1,153	1,163	1,195	1,233	1,310	1,468	1,898
Independent	Pat Casey	9.19	1,014	1,047	1,069	1,136	1,192	1,322	1,550
Fine Gael	Pat Byrne	8.61	950	997	1,019	1,111	1,111	1,224	
Sinn Féin	Eamonn Long	6.35	701	704	715	734	781		
Independent	Bob Kearns	3.77	416	419	438	449			
Progressive Democrats	Thomas Clarke	3.62	400	404	408				
Independent	Paul Leahy	1.85	204	206					
Electorate: 19,250 Valid: 11,036 (57.33%) Spoilt: 275 Quota: 1,840 Turnout: 11,311 (58.76%)
