= Gerry Horkan =

Irish politician

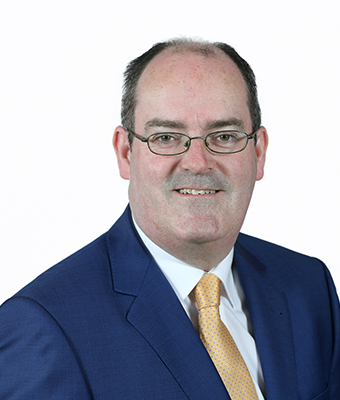
- Horkan in 2016

Senator
- In office 23 April 2021 – 30 January 2025
- In office 8 June 2016 – 29 June 2020
- Constituency: Industrial and Commercial Panel

Personal details
- Born: Dublin, Ireland
- Party: Fianna Fáil
- Education: University College Dublin

Gerry Horkan is an Irish Fianna Fáil politician who served as a Senator for the Industrial and Commercial Panel from April 2021 to January 2025, and previously from April 2016 to March 2020.

He was a member of Dún Laoghaire–Rathdown County Council from 2003 to 2016. He was the Fianna Fáil Seanad spokesperson on Finance. He lost his seat at the 2020 Seanad election, only to regain it a year later at the 2021 Seanad by-elections.

He lost his seat at the 2025 Seanad election.
