= 2021 Seanad by-elections =

By-elections to the 26th Seanad

Two by-elections were held for vacancies in Seanad Éireann on Wednesday, 21 April 2021. The vacancies were caused by the resignations of Fine Gael's Michael W. D'Arcy from the Agricultural Panel in September 2020 to become chief executive of the Irish Association of Institute Management; and of Sinn Féin's Elisha McCallion from the Industrial and Commercial Panel in October 2020 due to a COVID-19 grants controversy.

Fine Gael's Maria Byrne was elected to the Agricultural Panel, and Fianna Fáil's Gerry Horkan to the Industrial and Commercial Panel. Both were elected on the first count.

== Electoral system ==
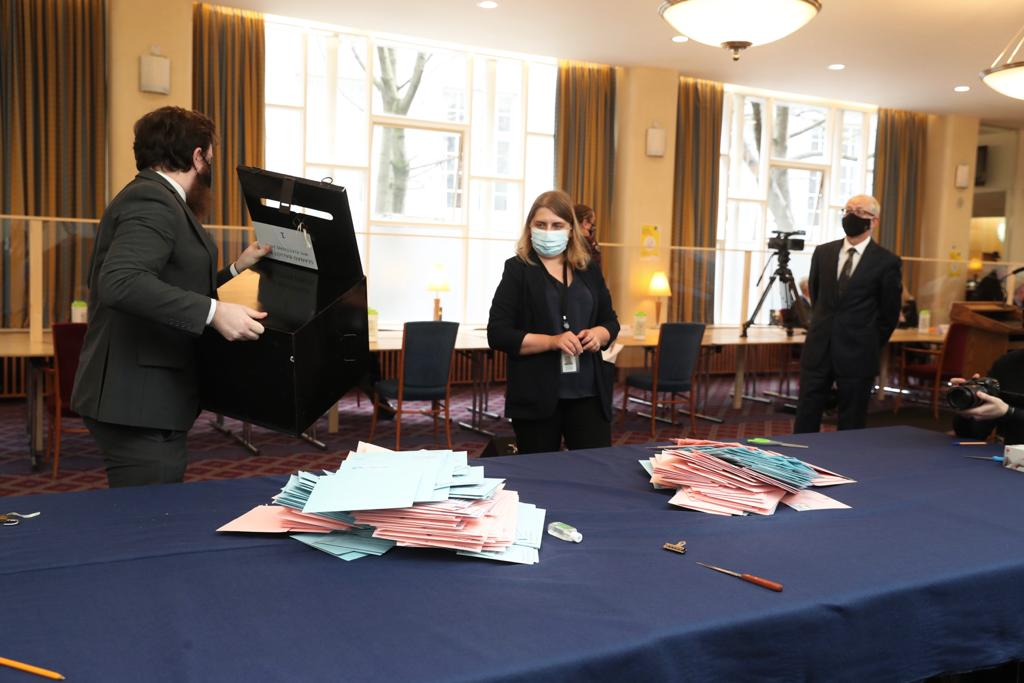
Ballots being tabulated

In vacancies in the Vocational panels, the electorate in by-elections consists of Oireachtas members only, which will consist of 160 TDs and 58 Senators. To be nominated, a candidate must have the signature of nine TDs and/or Senators. Ballot papers were issued on 7 April and the polls closed at 11 am on 21 April.

All votes were cast by postal ballot, and were counted using the single transferable vote. Under this system, voters can rank candidates in order of their preference, 1 as their first preference, 2 for second preference, and so on. Ballots are initially given a value of 1,000 to allow calculation of quotas (Droop quota) where all ballots are distributed in the case of a surplus.

== Process and dates ==
Michael W. D'Arcy resigned on 30 September 2020, with a notice of the vacancy sent to the Minister for Housing, Local Government and Heritage on 1 December. Elisha McCallion resigned on 5 November 2020, with a notice of the vacancy sent to the minister on 1 February 2021. The minister is required to make a Seanad by-election order within 180 days after receiving a notice of a vacancy. On 3 March 2021, Minister Darragh O'Brien made an order for the by-election which set the following dates:

- 23 March 2021: close of receiving nominations;
- 30 March 2021: ruling on nominations;
- 7 April 2021: issuing of ballot papers;
- 21 April 2021, at 11 a.m.: close of poll.

== Campaign ==
Fianna Fáil and Fine Gael ran one candidate each in different panels, and had a voting pact to back each other's candidates.

Sinn Féin did not run any candidates but backed independent Unionist Ian Marshall on the Agricultural Panel and Billy Lawless on the Industrial and Commercial Panel. The Social Democrats also supported Ian Marshall on the Agricultural Panel.

In early March 2021, the Green Party executive council, as well as the majority of their TDs and Senators, agreed not to run candidates for the Seanad by-election, but to leave each of the larger two parties, Fianna Fáil and Fine Gael, to run one candidate each, in line with an informal agreement between the three government parties. However, on 22 March 2021, Hazel Chu announced her intention to run as an independent candidate. As a result, Green Party leader Eamon Ryan indicated that he would not vote for her on this occasion, and further that Chu's role as party chairperson might be discussed internally.

== Results ==
=== Agricultural Panel ===
2021 Seanad by-election: Agricultural Panel
Party	Candidate	FPv%	Count
Party	Candidate	FPv%	1
Fine Gael	Maria Byrne	58.4	118,000
Ind. Unionist	Ian Marshall	34.2	69,000
Labour	Angela Feeney	7.4	15,000
Electorate: 218 (Note: To facilitate transfer of fractional surpluses, each valid ballot paper is given a value of 1,000.) Valid: 202,000 Quota: 101,001 Turnout: 92.7%

=== Industrial and Commercial Panel ===
2021 Seanad by-election: Industrial and Commercial Panel
Party	Candidate	FPv%	Count
Party	Candidate	FPv%	1
Fianna Fáil	Gerry Horkan	56.2	114,000
Independent	Billy Lawless	25.6	52,000
Labour	Ciarán Ahern	13.3	27,000
Independent	Hazel Chu (Note: Chu is a member of the Green Party but stood in the election as an independent candidate.)	4.9	10,000
Electorate: 218 Valid: 203,000 Spoilt: 4,000 Quota: 101,501 Turnout: 94.9%
