= Billy Lawless =

Irish politician (1950–2024)

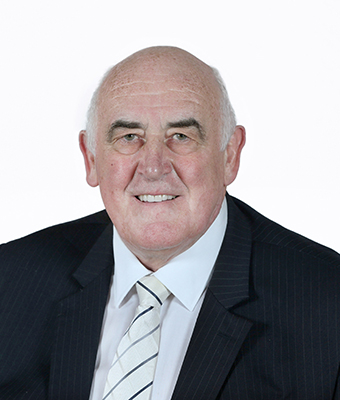
- Lawless in 2016

Senator
- In office 8 June 2016 – 29 June 2020
- Constituency: Nominated by the Taoiseach

Personal details
- Born: William Noel Lawless; 24 December 1950 Menlo, County Galway, Ireland
- Died: 8 November 2024 (aged 73) Chicago, Illinois, U.S.
- Party: Independent
- Spouse: Anne Lawless (m. 1980)
- Children: 4

William Noel Lawless Sr. (24 December 1950 – 8 November 2024) was an Irish independent politician and businessman who served as a Senator from 2016 to 2020, after being nominated by the Taoiseach. Lawless was from Rahoon, County Galway.

In the 1980s, he was chair of Fine Gael in the Galway West constituency and stood unsuccessfully for Galway City Council in 1991. He emigrated to Chicago in 1998, having always had plans to open a business in the United States. He made the decision after his daughter received a rowing scholarship to Boston University.

Lawless owned five restaurants in the Chicago area, employing 460 people, and was a board member and co-founder of the Illinois Business Immigration Coalition (IBIC) and chair of Chicago Celts for Immigration Reform.

Lawless was credited with helping the cause of Irish immigrants and undocumented Irish in America, and was made Freeman of Galway in 2015 for these efforts. He was conferred with an Honorary Doctorate by NUI Galway in June 2015. On 11 May 2016, Taoiseach Enda Kenny appointed Lawless to the 25th Seanad, making him the first overseas Irish senator.

Lawless had close ties to the Obama administration and was chosen to introduce the President when he announced his plans for immigration reform. He was an unsuccessful candidate at the 2021 Seanad by-elections. In 2021, Lawless was awarded the Irish Presidential Distinguished Service Award for Irish Community Support.

Lawless died in Chicago on 8 November 2024, at the age of 73 after suffering from kidney failure.
