= Ian Marshall (politician) =

Northern Irish farmer & politician (born 1968)

Ian Marshall OBE
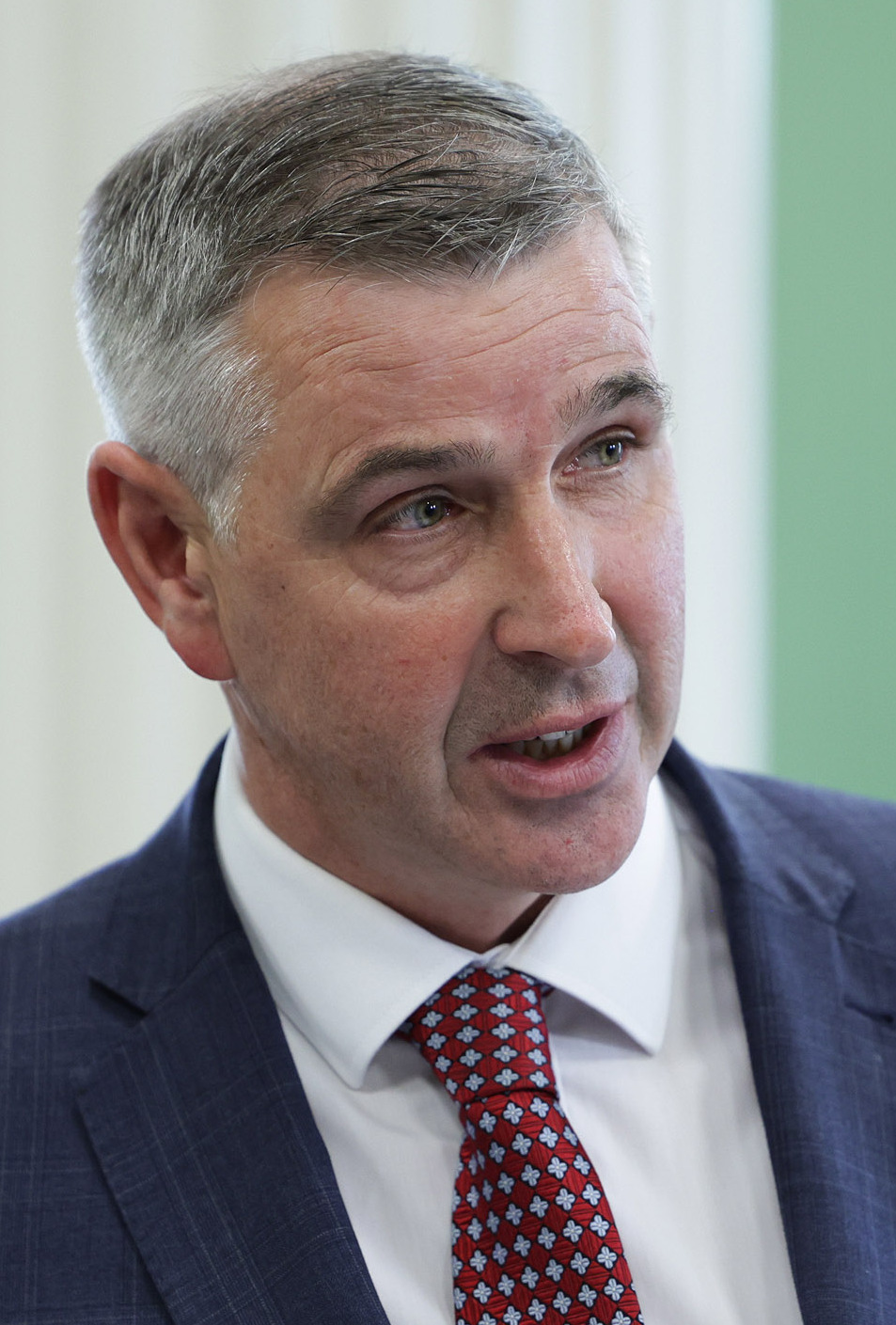
- Marshall in 2022

Senator
- In office 27 April 2018 – 29 June 2020
- Constituency: Agricultural Panel

President of the Ulster Farmers' Union
- In office 30 April 2014 – 27 April 2016
- Deputy: Barclay Bell; Ivor Ferguson
- Preceded by: Harry Sinclair
- Succeeded by: Barclay Bell

Personal details
- Born: 1968 (age 57–58) Markethill, County Armagh, Northern Ireland
- Party: Independent Unionist (until 2021; since 2023)
- Other political affiliations: Ulster Unionist (2021–2023)
- Education: Greenmount Agricultural College; Ulster University; Babson College
- Website: ianmarshall.info

Ian James Marshall OBE (born 1968) is a farmer and former Ulster Unionist Party (UUP) politician from Markethill, County Armagh, in Northern Ireland. He is from a unionist background and campaigned against Brexit. He was elected to Seanad Éireann in Dublin in 2018, but lost his seat in the 2020 Seanad election.

== Farming ==
Marshall is a dairy farmer. He was president of the Ulster Farmers' Union (UFU) from 2014 to 2016. In 2015 he invested in the controversial Renewable Heat Incentive scheme and later complained that its critics made no distinction between legitimate investors and those who misused the scheme. In February 2017 the UFU successfully challenged a 2012 reduction by DARD in Marshall's CAP grant, provoked by nitrate pollution detected by NIEA near his farm in 2010–2011, on the basis that the pollution was unintentional. In August 2017, Marshall was appointed Business Development Manager at the Institute for Global Food Security in Queen's University Belfast.

== Seanad (2018–2020) ==
Marshall was elected to the 25th Seanad on 27 April 2018 in a by-election for the Agricultural Panel. The vacancy was caused by the resignation of Denis Landy. He was approached to stand by then Taoiseach and Fine Gael leader Leo Varadkar; his candidacy was also supported by Sinn Féin. He had never been a member of a political party and sat as an Independent. He was the first unionist member elected to the Oireachtas since the 1930s.

He lost his seat at the 2020 Seanad election. He was an unsuccessful candidate at the 2021 Seanad by-election to the Agricultural Panel which followed the resignation of Fine Gael Senator Michael W. D'Arcy. He was again backed by Sinn Féin, but not by Fine Gael. In The Irish Times, columnist Fintan O'Toole lamented that "it was much more important for the Government parties to vote for one of their own than to place a single liberal unionist from Armagh (Ian Marshall) in the Oireachtas."

Marshall was appointed Officer of the Order of the British Empire (OBE) in the 2022 New Year Honours for public and political service.

== Ulster Unionist Party (2021–2023) ==
On 27 July 2021, the Ulster Unionist Party (UUP) announced that Marshall had joined the party. Marshall commented that the UUP offered "a moderate, considerate position" and a "move on from identity politics to focus on things that are a priority for most people – the economy, jobs, healthcare, housing and building good relationships across this island and between our two islands".

Marshall stood unsuccessfully as the UUP candidate for West Tyrone in the 2022 Northern Ireland Assembly election, polling 1,876 votes, 4.1% of the total. He resigned from the UUP in August 2023.
