= Garbhan Downey =

Northern Irish novelist and editor

- Born: 24 February 1966 (age 60); Derry, Northern Ireland
- Occupations: Novelist editor
- Spouse: Una McNally
- Writing career
- Genres: Crime Fiction; Thrillers

Garbhan Downey (born 24 February 1966) is a novelist and editor from Derry, Northern Ireland. He is the former Director of Communications and Marketing for Culture Company 2013, which delivered Derry's City of Culture year.

== Biography ==
Derry-born Downey cut his teeth in journalism, editing University College Galway's student magazine in the late 1980s. After graduating with an MSc in computing from the University of Ulster, he worked as an entertainment columnist for the Derry Journal and then as a staff reporter with the Londonderry Sentinel, before moving to the Irish News to become the paper’s Derry correspondent.

His offbeat reports of the 1994 World Cup for the Irish News were subsequently compiled for his first book, Just One Big Party. Downey spent six years as a BBC news producer in Derry and Belfast, before joining the Derry News as editor in 2001. During his period as editor (2001–2004), the Derry News won two Newspaper Society awards for Fastest Circulation Growth in the UK.

Since 2004, he has published six comic novels set in the criminal underbelly of post-ceasefire Ireland. His books have been described as "a superb blend of comedy, political dirty tricks, grisly murder and bizarre twists".

A former deputy-president of the Union of Students in Ireland, Downey was one of the organisers of a student occupation of government offices in Dublin on Budget Day 1988 in protest against education cutbacks.

Downey is a past pupil of St Columb's College, the Catholic grammar school whose past pupils include John Hume, Seamus Heaney and Brian Friel.

In June 2002, the Police Service of Northern Ireland got a court order to force Downey to hand over pictures the Derry News had captured of the Real IRA attacking a communications post.

In 2006, he helped establish the new Northern Ireland literary review Verbal and edited the publication for its first six issues.

In 2007, he worked as an election pundit for TV3, alongside the Irish comedian Brendan O'Carroll. In 2010, he won a contest to predict the winners of Northern Ireland's 18 Westminster constituencies, missing out on just one, Naomi Long, who beat First Minister Peter Robinson in East Belfast. Downey donated his prize, a framed Ian Knox cartoon, to Long by way of apology.

His 2010 comedy-thriller The American Envoy was the first novel issued by an Irish publishing house as a Kindle e-book, simultaneously with its paperback release.

In June 2011, he was appointed Director of Media for Culture Company 2013, the body tasked with delivering Derry's UK City of Culture year.

Downey is married to Una McNally, and they have two children.

== Bibliography ==
- Just One Big Party (1994)
- Creggan: More Than A History (2000) with Michael McGuinness
- Private Diary of a Suspended MLA (2004)
- Off Broadway (2005)
- Running Mates (2007)
- Yours Confidentially (2008)
- City of Music: Derry's Music Heritage (2009) with Declan Carlin
- War of the Blue Roses (2009)
- Invisible Lives: Stories of Adults with Learning Disabilities Editor (2009)
- The American Envoy (2010)
- Requiems for the Departed with Ken Bruen, Maxim Jakubowski, Stuart Neville et al. (2010)
- Across the Line (2012)
- Downey, Garbhan (May 2026). A Bitter Harvest: The Good Life and Unresolved Murder of a Derry GAA Man. ISBN 9781914009563.
