= Jennifer Whitmore =

Irish politician and environmentalist (born 1974)

Jennifer Whitmore TD
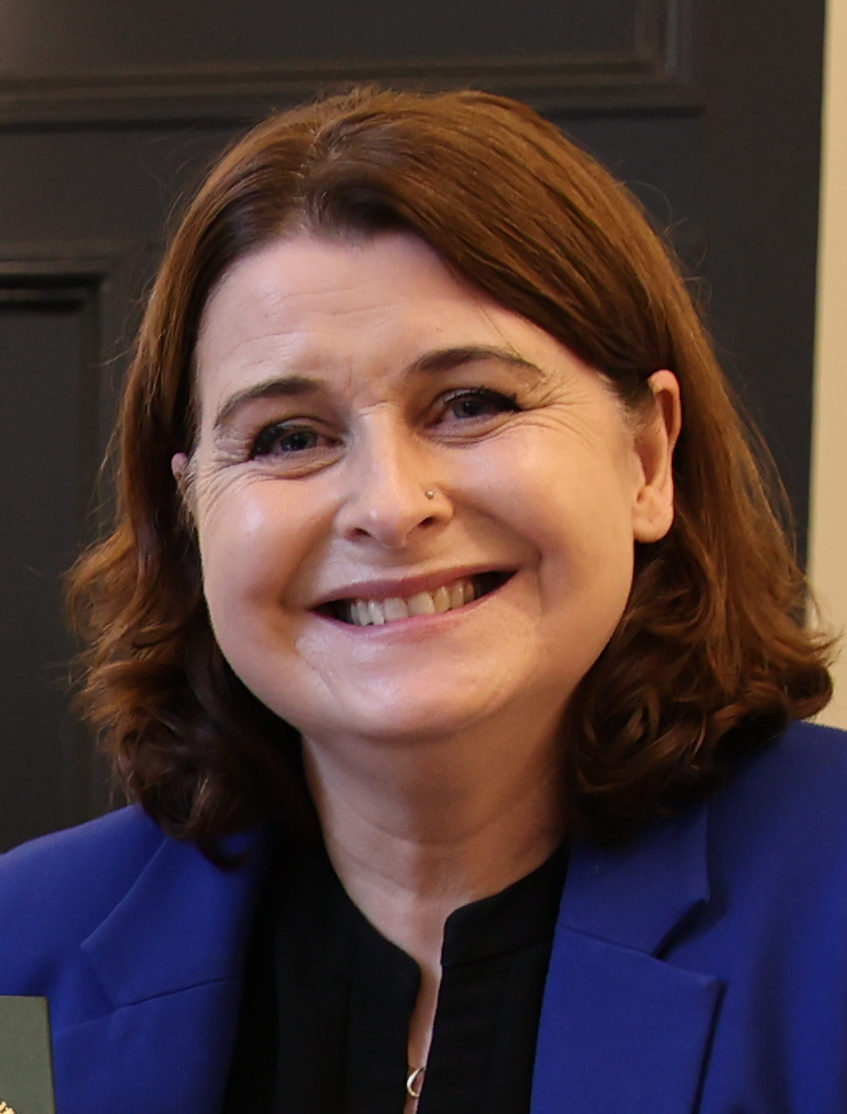
- Whitmore in 2024

Teachta Dála
- Incumbent
- Assumed office February 2020
- Constituency: Wicklow

Personal details
- Born: June 1974 (age 52) Wexford, Ireland
- Party: Social Democrats
- Spouse: Tony Whitmore
- Children: 4
- Education: Galway-Mayo Institute of Technology; University of Ulster; University of Sydney
- Website: jenniferwhitmore.ie

Jennifer Whitmore (born June 1974) is an Irish Social Democrats politician who has been a Teachta Dála (TD) for the Wicklow constituency since the 2020 general election.

== Early life and education ==
Whitmore is from Wexford. She gained two diplomas at the Galway-Mayo Institute of Technology and later graduated with a Bachelor of Science in Biological Science and Ecology from the University of Ulster. During the ten years she resided in Australia, she studied Environmental Law at the University of Sydney.

== Career ==
Whitmore has worked in both local and international ecology and environmentalism as well as with the Government of New South Wales, Australia. In 2015, she founded the East Wicklow Rivers Trust.

She was elected to represent the Greystones local electoral area on the Wicklow County Council, following the 2014 local elections. In July 2015, she helped co-found the Social Democrats as a party and became the party's Spokesperson for Children.

Whitmore was elected as a Social Democrat TD for the Wicklow constituency following the 2020 general election. In the election, she came ahead of former Social Democrats TD and leader Stephen Donnelly who left the party after just one year, citing difficulties in cooperating with the other leaders.

In September 2021, Whitmore tabled a Just Transition Bill in the Dáil; the Bill was deliberately almost identical to one the Green Party had tabled in 2017 while in opposition but had been voted down. At the time, Green leader Eamon Ryan called their proposed bill a "critical piece of the architecture" of any policy on climate action. One amendment Whitmore did make however was to define the term "Just Transition", as the previous version of the bill did not. Whitmore said the bill would define "just transition" as a green transition that ensures the economic and social consequences of the climate 'emergency' are managed to maximise "opportunities of decent work for all, reduce inequalities, promote social justice, and support industries, workers and communities negatively affected".

At the 2024 general election, Whitmore was re-elected to the Dáil.

== Personal life ==
Whitmore lives in Delgany, County Wicklow, with her husband Tony and their four children.

| Dáil | Election | Deputy (Party) | Deputy (Party) | Deputy (Party) | Deputy (Party) | Deputy (Party) |
|---|---|---|---|---|---|---|
| 4th | 1923 | Christopher Byrne (CnaG) | James Everett (Lab) | Richard Wilson (FP) | 3 seats 1923–1981 | |
| 5th | 1927 (Jun) | Séamus Moore (FF) | James Everett (Lab) | Dermot O'Mahony (CnaG) | 3 seats 1923–1981 | |
| 6th | 1927 (Sep) | Séamus Moore (FF) | James Everett (Lab) | Dermot O'Mahony (CnaG) | 3 seats 1923–1981 | |
| 7th | 1932 | Séamus Moore (FF) | James Everett (Lab) | Dermot O'Mahony (CnaG) | 3 seats 1923–1981 | |
| 8th | 1933 | Séamus Moore (FF) | James Everett (Lab) | Dermot O'Mahony (CnaG) | 3 seats 1923–1981 | |
| 9th | 1937 | Séamus Moore (FF) | James Everett (Lab) | Dermot O'Mahony (FG) | 3 seats 1923–1981 | |
| 10th | 1938 | Séamus Moore (FF) | James Everett (Lab) | Patrick Cogan (Ind.) | 3 seats 1923–1981 | |
| 11th | 1943 | Christopher Byrne (FF) | James Everett (Lab) | Patrick Cogan (CnaT) | 3 seats 1923–1981 | |
| 12th | 1944 | Thomas Brennan (FF) | James Everett (NLP) | Patrick Cogan (CnaT) | 3 seats 1923–1981 | |
| 13th | 1948 | Thomas Brennan (FF) | James Everett (NLP) | Patrick Cogan (Ind.) | 3 seats 1923–1981 | |
| 14th | 1951 | Thomas Brennan (FF) | James Everett (Lab) | Patrick Cogan (Ind.) | 3 seats 1923–1981 | |
| 14th | 1953 by-election | Mark Deering (FG) | James Everett (Lab) | Patrick Cogan (Ind.) | 3 seats 1923–1981 | |
| 15th | 1954 | Mark Deering (FG) | James Everett (Lab) | Paudge Brennan (FF) | 3 seats 1923–1981 | |
| 16th | 1957 | James O'Toole (FF) | James Everett (Lab) | Paudge Brennan (FF) | 3 seats 1923–1981 | |
| 17th | 1961 | Michael O'Higgins (FG) | James Everett (Lab) | Paudge Brennan (FF) | 3 seats 1923–1981 | |
| 18th | 1965 | Michael O'Higgins (FG) | James Everett (Lab) | Paudge Brennan (FF) | 3 seats 1923–1981 | |
| 18th | 1968 by-election | Michael O'Higgins (FG) | Godfrey Timmins (FG) | Paudge Brennan (FF) | 3 seats 1923–1981 | |
| 19th | 1969 | Liam Kavanagh (Lab) | Godfrey Timmins (FG) | Paudge Brennan (FF) | 3 seats 1923–1981 | |
| 20th | 1973 | Liam Kavanagh (Lab) | Godfrey Timmins (FG) | Ciarán Murphy (FF) | 3 seats 1923–1981 | |
| 21st | 1977 | Liam Kavanagh (Lab) | Godfrey Timmins (FG) | Ciarán Murphy (FF) | 3 seats 1923–1981 | |
| 22nd | 1981 | Liam Kavanagh (Lab) | Godfrey Timmins (FG) | Ciarán Murphy (FF) | Paudge Brennan (FF) | 4 seats 1981–1992 |
| 23rd | 1982 (Feb) | Liam Kavanagh (Lab) | Godfrey Timmins (FG) | Ciarán Murphy (FF) | Gemma Hussey (FG) | 4 seats 1981–1992 |
| 24th | 1982 (Nov) | Liam Kavanagh (Lab) | Godfrey Timmins (FG) | Paudge Brennan (FF) | Gemma Hussey (FG) | 4 seats 1981–1992 |
| 25th | 1987 | Liam Kavanagh (Lab) | Joe Jacob (FF) | Dick Roche (FF) | Gemma Hussey (FG) | 4 seats 1981–1992 |
| 26th | 1989 | Liam Kavanagh (Lab) | Joe Jacob (FF) | Dick Roche (FF) | Godfrey Timmins (FG) | 4 seats 1981–1992 |
| 27th | 1992 | Liam Kavanagh (Lab) | Joe Jacob (FF) | Liz McManus (DL) | Godfrey Timmins (FG) | Johnny Fox (Ind.) |
| 27th | 1995 by-election | Liam Kavanagh (Lab) | Joe Jacob (FF) | Liz McManus (DL) | Godfrey Timmins (FG) | Mildred Fox (Ind.) |
| 28th | 1997 | Dick Roche (FF) | Joe Jacob (FF) | Liz McManus (DL) | Billy Timmins (FG) | Mildred Fox (Ind.) |
| 29th | 2002 | Dick Roche (FF) | Joe Jacob (FF) | Liz McManus (Lab) | Billy Timmins (FG) | Mildred Fox (Ind.) |
| 30th | 2007 | Dick Roche (FF) | Joe Behan (FF) | Liz McManus (Lab) | Billy Timmins (FG) | Andrew Doyle (FG) |
| 31st | 2011 | Simon Harris (FG) | Stephen Donnelly (Ind.) | Anne Ferris (Lab) | Billy Timmins (FG) | Andrew Doyle (FG) |
| 32nd | 2016 | Simon Harris (FG) | Stephen Donnelly (SD) | John Brady (SF) | Pat Casey (FF) | Andrew Doyle (FG) |
| 33rd | 2020 | Simon Harris (FG) | Stephen Donnelly (FF) | John Brady (SF) | Jennifer Whitmore (SD) | Steven Matthews (GP) |
| 34th | 2024 | Simon Harris (FG) | Edward Timmins (FG) | John Brady (SF) | Jennifer Whitmore (SD) | 4 seats since 2024 |
