= Jim Ruttle =

Irish politician (born c. 1952)

Senator
- In office 20 June 1980 – 8 October 1981
- Constituency: Nominated by the Taoiseach

Personal details
- Born: James Ruttle c. 1952 County Wicklow, Ireland
- Party: Independent; Fianna Fáil
- Spouse: Kathryn Ruttle
- Children: 2
- Education: Gurteen Agricultural College

James Ruttle (born c. 1952) is an Irish former politician. He was a Fianna Fáil member of Seanad Éireann from 1980 to 1981. He was nominated by the Taoiseach to the 14th Seanad on 20 June 1980 to fill vacancy created by the resignation of Michael Yeats. He did not contest the 1981 Seanad election. He was an unsuccessful Fianna Fáil candidate for the Wicklow constituency at the 1981 general election.

In 1988 he was co-opted to replace the deceased councillor Jim Miley by Fianna Fáil, however he was not selected to run for the party in 1991 local elections.

From 1991 to 2019, he was an independent member of Wicklow County Council for the Baltinglass electoral area, which covers the western portion of County Wicklow. He retired from politics at the 2019 local elections.

== Personal life ==
Ruttle is the son of Earnest Ruttle and Jane Valentine, and is a member of the Church of Ireland. He trained in Gurteen Agricultural College. A farmer in Manor Kilbride, he is married to Kathryn, and they have two sons.
