= 1995 Wicklow by-election =

By-election to the 27th Dáil

- 29 June 1995
- Turnout: 43,589 (53.5%)
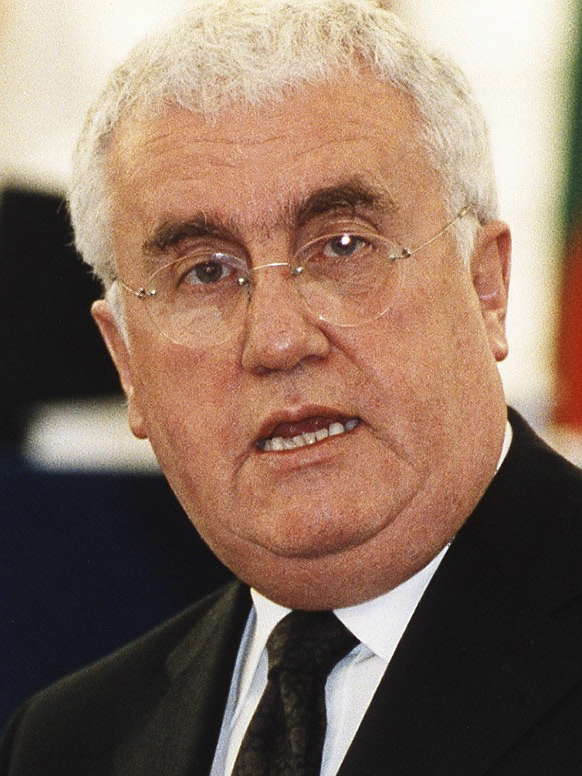
	Fox		Honan
Nominee	Mildred Fox	Dick Roche	Tom Honan
Party	Independent	Fianna Fáil	Fine Gael
First preferences	11,724	10,060	5,503
Percentage	26.9%	23.1%	12.6%
Final count	22,922	14,895	–
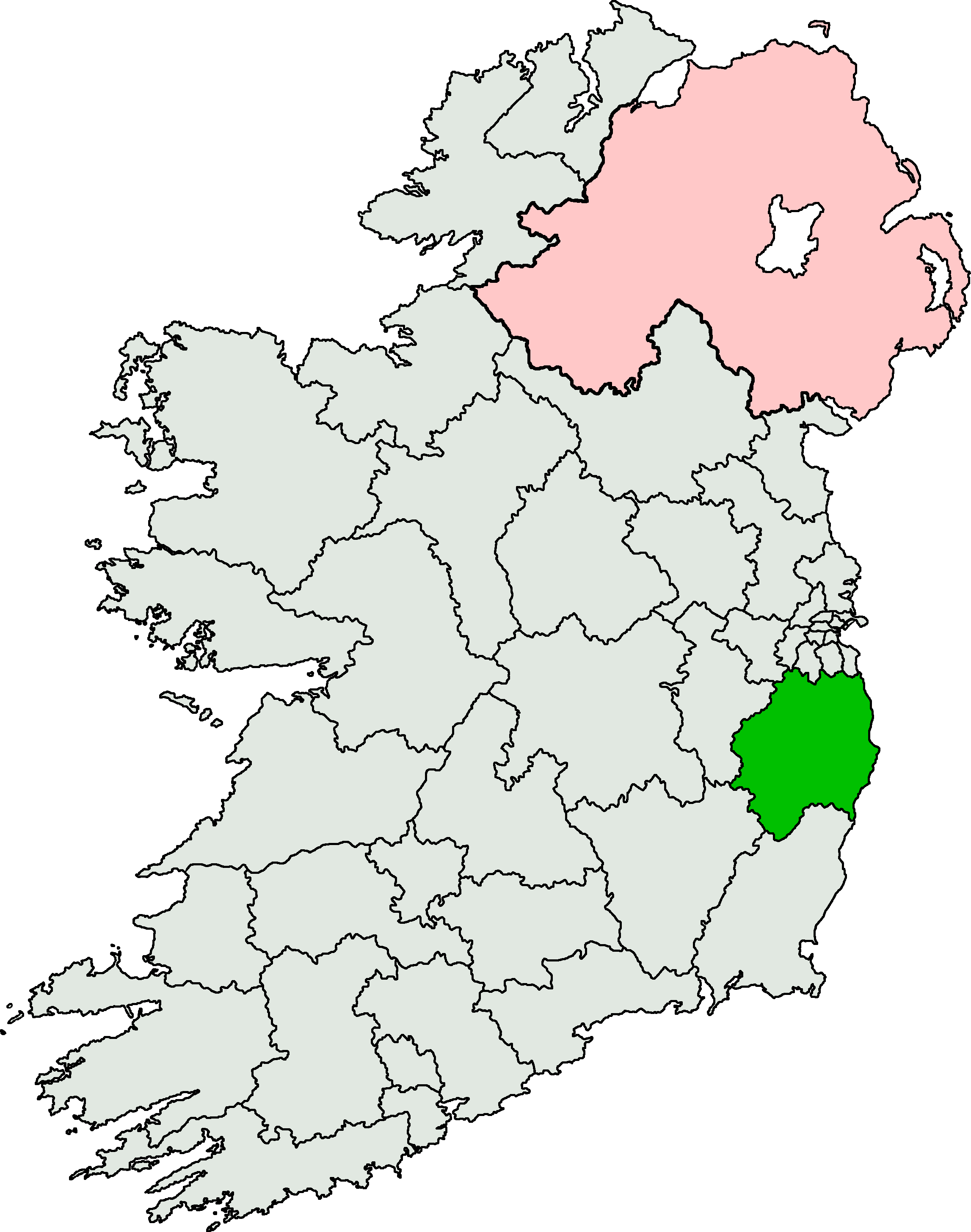
- Wicklow shown within Ireland
TD before election
Johnny Fox
Independent
Elected TD
Mildred Fox
Independent

A Dáil by-election was held in the constituency of Wicklow in Ireland on Thursday, 29 June 1995, to fill a vacancy in the 27th Dáil. It followed the death of independent Teachta Dála (TD) Johnny Fox on 17 March 1995.

The writ of election to fill the vacancy was agreed by the Dáil on 1 June 1995.

The by-election was won by independent Wicklow County Councillor Mildred Fox, daughter of the deceased TD, Johnny Fox.

Among the candidates were Senator and Wicklow county councillor, Dick Roche, Wicklow county councillor Tom Honan, Nicky Kelly, former Wicklow county councillor and then husband of sitting TD Liz McManus, John McManus and Wicklow county councillor Susan Philips.

== Result ==
1995 Wicklow by-election
Party	Candidate	FPv%	Count							
Party	Candidate	FPv%	1	2	3	4	5	6	7	8
Independent	Mildred Fox	26.9	11,724	11,872	12,627	13,119	13,928	15,131	17,793	22,922
Fianna Fáil	Dick Roche	23.1	10,060	10,135	10,352	10,536	11,194	11,968	13,056	14,895
Fine Gael	Tom Honan	12.6	5,503	5,529	5,725	5,912	6,246	7,996	9,971	
Labour	Tim Collins	11.6	5,064	5,139	5,279	5,591	6,527	7,203		
Independent	Nicky Kelly	10.5	4,556	4,635	4,729	4,943	5,250			
Democratic Left	John McManus	6.5	2,841	2,907	2,956	3,249				
Independent	Susan Philips	3.7	1,627	1,663						
Green	Emer Singleton	3.6	1,565	1,674	1,816					
Independent	Charlie Keddy	0.6	254							
Workers' Party	Frank Hayes	0.5	211							
Natural Law	Desmond Garrett	0.2	104							
Independent	Jim Tallon	0.2	80							
Electorate: 81,525 Valid: 43,589 Quota: 21,795 Turnout: 53.5%
