= 1991 Wicklow County Council election =

Part of the 1991 Irish local elections

← 1985	27 June 1991	1999 →

All 24 seats to Wicklow County Council
	First party	Second party	Third party
Party	Fianna Fáil	Labour	Fine Gael
Seats won	9	5	4
Seat change	-4	+1	-1
	Fourth party	Fifth party	Sixth party
Party	Workers' Party	Green	Independent
Seats won	1	1	4
Seat change	0	+1	+3
- Map showing the area of Wicklow County Council
Council control after election
TBD

An election to Wicklow County Council took place on 27 June 1991 as part of that year's Irish local elections. 24 councillors were elected from five local electoral areas (LEAs) for a five-year term of office on the electoral system of proportional representation by means of the single transferable vote (PR-STV). This term was extended twice, first to 1998, then to 1999.

== Results by party ==
Party	Seats	±	First Pref. votes	FPv%	±%
Fianna Fáil	9	-4	12,521	32.16	
Labour	5	+1	7,474	19.20	
Fine Gael	4	-1	5,696	14.63	
Workers' Party	1	0	2,077	5.33	
Green	1	+1	960	2.47	
Independent	4	+3	8,221	21.12	
Totals	24	-	38,934	100.00	—

== Results by local electoral area ==
=== Arklow ===
Arklow - 6 seats
Party	Candidate	FPv%	Count								
Party	Candidate	FPv%	1	2	3	4	5	6	7	8	9
Fianna Fáil	Dr. Bill O'Connell*	14.1%	1,267	1,311							
Independent	Vincent McElheron	13.4%	1,205	1,262	1,268	1,290					
Labour	Kevin Ryan	12.02%	1,079	1,084	1,084	1,096	1,138	1,152	1,158	1,352	
Fine Gael	Vincent Blake*	11.3%	1,020	1,022	1,022	1,056	1,076	1,101	1,107	1,127	1,140
Fianna Fáil	Pat Doran*	10.9%	977	978	978	1,005	1,011	1,016	1,074	1,087	1,090
Fianna Fáil	Thomas Keenan*	10.2%	914	921	923	945	972	986	1,132	1,195	1,212
Fine Gael	Thomas Honan	7.5%	671	682	688	705	740	847	919	1,143	1,176
Labour	Sean Wolohan	6.2%	557	587	589	606	665	712	847		
Fianna Fáil	Pat Sweeney*	4.9%	440	449	457	477	488	513			
Progressive Democrats	Michael Horsman	2.7%	241	248	248	265	275				
Workers' Party	Michael Keogh	2.5%	225	227	227	231					
Independent	Catherine Byrne	2.4%	212	218	219						
Independent	Denis Kinsella	2.1%	190								
Electorate: 13,865 Valid: 8,998 (64.9%) Spoilt: 94 Quota: 1,286 Turnout: 9,092 (65.58%)

=== Baltinglass ===
Baltinglass - 3 seats
Party	Candidate	FPv%	Count						
Party	Candidate	FPv%	1	2	3	4	5	6	7
Independent	Jim Ruttle*	31%	1,905						
Fine Gael	Godfrey Timmins TD*	19.4%	1,190	1,310	1,346	1,380	1,453	1,854	
Labour	Tommy Cullen	17.5%	1,077	1,113	1,169	1,182	1,241	1,333	1,431
Fianna Fáil	Hugh O'Keeffe*	11.2%	687	718	730	922	977	1,041	1,140
Fine Gael	Pascal Deering	7.5%	460	514	608	653	688		
Sinn Féin	Gerry O'Neill	4.9%	302	342	365	377			
Fianna Fáil	Ann McGrath	4.3%	266	307	323				
Independent	Adrian Williams	3.7%	229	264					
Independent	Michael Scanlon	0.4%	27	39					
Electorate: 8,688 Valid: 6,143 (70.71%) Spoilt: 29 Quota: 1,536 Turnout: 6,172 (71.04%)

=== Bray ===
Bray - 6 seats
Party	Candidate	FPv%	Count												
Party	Candidate	FPv%	1	2	3	4	5	6	7	8	9	10	11	12	13
Workers' Party	Liz McManus*	12.7%	1,047	1,063	1,083	1,194									
Labour	John Byrne*	11.9%	978	979	1,053	1,070	1,070	1,094	1,209						
Fianna Fáil	Michael Lawlor*	9.3%	767	769	770	780	781	803	813	816	824	839	933	972	1,167
Fianna Fáil	Joe Behan	8.4%	687	691	695	700	700	722	739	741	752	785	844	871	981
Fine Gael	Senator Shane Ross	7.8%	642	650	660	665	665	703	715	717	898	965	989	1,011	1,058
Fianna Fáil	Noel Keyes	7.3%	602	606	608	629	631	641	653	657	673	690	750	791	
Fianna Fáil	Pat Vance*	7%	576	580	585	593	593	618	635	637	656	684	802	841	1,055
Independent	Jane Murphy*	7%	574	576	582	592	593	643	666	668	701	776	816	863	929
Fianna Fáil	Michael Ledwidge*	4.6%	379	380	381	386	386	404	407	408	420	436			
Sinn Féin	Gerry McDonnell	4.5%	371	373	376	393	394	398	410	412	415	442	446		
Green	Barry Ahern	3.6%	297	300	310	315	316	329	358	372	396				
Fine Gael	Michael Kennedy	3.5%	286	290	293	299	299	330	337	338					
Workers' Party	Dermot Tobin	3.1%	259	264	266	302	313	328							
Workers' Party	Anne Egan	3.1%	256	256	264										
Progressive Democrats	Ciarán Murphy*	3%	250	291	294	296	297								
Labour	Carmel McKenna	3%	153	156											
Progressive Democrats	Michael Noble	1.2%	101												
Electorate: 18,096 Valid: 8,225 (45.45%) Spoilt: 79 Quota: 1,176 Turnout: 8,304 (45.89%)

=== Greystones ===
Greystones - 4 seats
Party	Candidate	FPv%	Count								
Party	Candidate	FPv%	1	2	3	4	5	6	7	8	9
Fianna Fáil	Johnny Fox*	17.2%	1,205	1,215	1,225	1,277	1,306	1,335	1,425		
Fianna Fáil	Dick Roche TD*	14.4%	1,008	1,014	1,033	1,042	1,055	1,099	1,169	1,326	1,368
Independent	George Jones*	13.6%	955	968	1,011	1,017	1,050	1,161	1,248	1,527	
Independent	John Leeson*	13.2%	921	925	946	991	995	1,038	1,053	1,092	1,131
Independent	Jack Murnane	9.7%	679	696	713	724	770	818	893		
Green	Nuala Ahern	9.5%	663	671	704	735	751	865	989	1,237	1,283
Fine Gael	Breda Allen	6.2%	436	440	464	469	474				
Labour	Charlie Keddy	5.9%	411	413	420	451	561	606			
Labour	Joseph Sweeney	3.4%	241	251	258	271					
Progressive Democrats	Joseph Lalor	2.7%	188	190							
Workers' Party	Christy Devlin	2.6%	181	213	214						
Workers' Party	James Hogan	1.6%	109								
Electorate: 13,644 Valid: 6,997 (51.28%) Spoilt: 60 Quota: 1,400 Turnout: 7,057 (51.72%)

=== Wicklow ===
Wicklow - 5 seats
Party	Candidate	FPv%	Count							
Party	Candidate	FPv%	1	2	3	4	5	6	7	8
Labour	Liam Kavanagh TD*	22.5%	1,927							
Fianna Fáil	Joe Jacob TD*	16.6%	1,422	1,453						
Independent	Susan Phillips*	11.3%	966	1,016	1,017	1,068	1,121	1,226	1,396	1,530
Fianna Fáil	Pat Doyle	9.7%	835	845	847	852	855	862	1,025	1,311
Labour	Frank Hynes*	8.5%	726	879	885	902	1,058	1,129	1,199	1,277
Fine Gael	Mary Miley	7.6%	652	667	671	829	925	954	1,035	1,078
Progressive Democrats	John Larkin	6.2%	532	559	559	582	593	612		
Fianna Fáil	John Giff*	5.7%	489	538	545	586	599	715	772	
Independent	Robert Kearns	4.2%	358	409	410	458	475			
Fine Gael	Ollie Lalor	4%	339	382	382					
Labour	Joseph O'Shaughnessy	3.8%	325	394	397	411				
Electorate: 14,988 Valid: 8,571 (57.19%) Spoilt: 85 Quota: 1,429 Turnout: 8,656 (57.75%)
