= 1999 Wicklow County Council election =

Part of the 1999 Irish local elections

← 1991	10 June 1999	2004 →

All 24 seats on Wicklow County Council
	First party	Second party	Third party
Party	Fianna Fáil	Fine Gael	Labour
Seats won	8	6	5
Seat change	-1	+2	0
	Fourth party	Fifth party	Sixth party
Party	Green	Independent	Workers' Party
Seats won	1	4	0
Seat change	0	0	-1
- Map showing the area of Wicklow County Council
Council control after election
TBD

An election to Wicklow County Council took place on 10 June 1999 as part of that year's Irish local elections. 24 councillors were elected from five local electoral areas for a five-year term of office on the system of proportional representation by means of the single transferable vote (PR-STV).

== Results by party ==
Party	Seats	±	First Pref. votes	FPv%	±%
Fianna Fáil	8	-1	13,602	33.11	
Fine Gael	6	+2	8,846	21.53	
Labour	5	0	8,493	20.67	
Green	1	0	1,514	3.69	
Independent	4	0	7,828	19.05	
Workers' Party	0	-1	N/A	N/A	
Totals	24	-	41,086	100.00	—

== Results by local electoral area ==
=== Arklow ===
Arklow - 5 seats
Party	Candidate	FPv%	Count						
Party	Candidate	FPv%	1	2	3	4	5	6	7
Independent	Nicky Kelly	23.57	2,403						
Fine Gael	Vincent Blake*	14.28	1,456	1,476	1,546	1,570	1,575	1,668	1,719
Fianna Fáil	Dr. Bill O'Connell*	13.52	1,379	1,597	1,646	1,860			
Fianna Fáil	Pat Doran*	12.40	1,264	812	945	1,359			
Labour	Kevin Ryan*	10.41	1,062	1,093	1,107	1,135	1,141	1,210	1,292
Fine Gael	Sylvester Bourke	7.56	771	844	948	1,017	1,044	1,121	1,378
Fianna Fáil	Liam O'Loughlin	6.20	632	653	672	693	714		
Fianna Fáil	Pat Sweeney	5.53	564	668	702	823	915	1,060	
Independent	Vincent McElheron*	3.45	352	524	567				
Fine Gael	Gwen Brennan	3.08	314	368					
Electorate: 16,500 Valid: 10,197 (61.80%) Spoilt: 157 Quota: 1,700 Turnout: 10,354 (62.75%)

=== Baltinglass ===
Baltinglass - 3 seats
Party	Candidate	FPv%	Count						
Party	Candidate	FPv%	1	2	3	4	5	6	7
Fine Gael	Billy Timmins TD	23.42	1,483	1,501	1,648				
Labour	Tommy Cullen*	23.04	1,459	1,477	1,487	1,493	1,542	1,613	
Independent	Jim Ruttle*	15.11	957	1,019	1,082	1,117	1,273	1,381	1,651
Fianna Fáil	Hugh O'Keeffe	9.95	630	637	647	648	677	985	1,092
Fianna Fáil	Charlie Brophy	8.04	509	523	536	543	585		
Sinn Féin	Gerry O'Neill	6.85	434	482	487	489	590	625	
Independent	Eileen Cullen	5.75	364	411	424	437			
Fine Gael	Fintan Gilheany	3.98	252	275					
Independent	Nuala Haughian	3.87	245						
Electorate: 10,418 Valid: 6,333 (60.79%) Spoilt: 51 Quota: 1,584 Turnout: 6,384 (61.28%)

=== Bray ===
Bray - 7 seats
Party	Candidate	FPv%	Count										
Party	Candidate	FPv%	1	2	3	4	5	6	7	8	9	10	11
Independent	Mildred Fox TD*	16.64	1,752										
Labour	Liz McManus TD	14.18	1,493										
Fianna Fáil	Joe Behan*	12.89	1,357										
Fianna Fáil	Pat Vance*	11.34	1,193	1,260	1,281	1,291	1,330						
Fianna Fáil	Michael Lawlor*	8.68	914	1,028	1,041	1,051	1,064	1,066	1,097	1,146	1,169	1,424	
Labour	John Byrne*	7.91	833	863	893	898	951	953	978	1,018	1,193	1,277	1,312
Green	Déirdre de Búrca	6.69	704	755	773	775	791	793	808	926	998	1,080	1,109
Fine Gael	John Ryan	5.71	601	641	656	658	666	668	888	904	956	1,043	1,086
Fianna Fáil	Noel Keyes	5.01	531	558	565	572	598	600	612	652	695		
Sinn Féin	Marie Gavaghan	3.50	369	381	385	386	398	399	404				
Fine Gael	Declan Burton	2.68	282	343	350	351	358	359					
Labour	Anne Ferris	2.47	260	275	311	312	393	394	405	439			
Labour	Anne Egan	2.27	239	258	283	284							
Electorate: 24,966 Valid: 10,529 (42.17%) Spoilt: 113 Quota: 1,317 Turnout: 10,642 (42.63%)

=== Greystones ===
Greystones - 4 seats
Party	Candidate	FPv%	Count						
Party	Candidate	FPv%	1	2	3	4	5	6	7
Fianna Fáil	Dick Roche TD*	24.69	1,389						
Fine Gael	George Jones*	21.01	1,182						
Fine Gael	Derek Mitchell	13.05	734	768	799	823	901	995	1,152
Independent	Chris Maloney	9.58	539	573	581	617	673	748	840
Independent	Veronica O'Reilly	8.59	483	507	512	546	603	699	870
Green	Alex Perkins*	7.20	405	426	430	463	519	629	
Labour	Colm Kirwan*	6.95	391	404	408	449	492		
Fianna Fáil	Thelma Cloake	5.10	287	407	409	441			
Independent	Charlie Keddy	3.82	215	232	234				
Electorate: 13,352 Valid: 5,625 (42.13%) Spoilt: 74 Quota: 1,126 Turnout: 5,699 (42.68%)

=== Wicklow ===
Wicklow - 5 seats
Party	Candidate	FPv%	Count					
Party	Candidate	FPv%	1	2	3	4	5	6
Labour	Liam Kavanagh*	15.07	1,839					
Fianna Fáil	Noel Jacob*	14.64	1,230	1,269	1,304	1,485		
Fianna Fáil	Pat Doyle*	14.11	1,186	1,207	1,229	1,325	1,383	1,450
Fine Gael	Andrew Doyle	12.64	1,062	1,086	1,135	1,159	1,164	1,209
Labour	Jimmy O'Shaughnessy*	10.75	903	1,066	1,184	1,237	1,246	1,418
Fine Gael	Pat Byrne	8.44	709	764	820	941	949	1,082
Fianna Fáil	Lance O'Brien	6.39	537	595	617			
Independent	Robert Kearns	6.16	518	572	653	728	732	
Green	Martin Shiels	4.99	419	443				
Electorate: 17,040 Valid: 8,403 (49.31%) Spoilt: 88 Quota: 1,401 Turnout: 8,491 (49.83%)
