= 1985 Wicklow County Council election =

Part of the 1985 Irish local elections

← 1979	20 June 1985	1991 →

All 24 seats on Wicklow County Council
	First party	Second party	Third party
Party	Fianna Fáil	Fine Gael	Labour
Seats won	13	5	4
Seat change	+6	-3	0
	Fourth party	Fifth party
Party	Workers' Party	Independent
Seats won	1	1
Seat change	0	0
- Map showing the area of Wicklow County Council
Council control after election
Fianna Fail

An election to Wicklow County Council took place on 20 June 1985 as part of the Irish local elections. 24 councillors were elected from five local electoral areas (LEAs) for a five-year term of office on the electoral system of proportional representation by means of the single transferable vote (PR-STV). This term was extended for a further year, to 1991.

== Results by party ==
Party	Seats	±	First Pref. votes	FPv%	±%
Fianna Fáil	13	+6	14,930	40.48	
Fine Gael	5	-3	9,834	26.66	
Labour	4	-	6,711	18.20	
Workers' Party	1	-	2,343	6.35	
Independent	1	-	2,709	7.35	
Totals	24	+3	36,882	100.00	—

== Results by local electoral area ==
=== Arklow ===
Arklow: 6 seats
Party	Candidate	FPv%	Count											
Party	Candidate	FPv%	1	2	3	4	5	6	7	8	9	10	11	12
Fianna Fáil	Dr. Bill O'Connell*		1,382											
Fine Gael	Vincent Blake*		1,128	1,134	1,135	1,157	1,166	1,291	1,354					
Fianna Fáil	Pat Doran		950	951	953	958	961	972	973	973	991	999	1,071	1,092
Labour	Kevin Ryan*		863	887	888	889	910	933	941	945	963	1,020	1,040	1,042
Fianna Fáil	Thomas Keenan*		822	839	845	849	861	953	961	964	999	1,049	1,124	1,168
Fianna Fáil	John Sweeney*		628	628	651	665	705	712	767	768	904	997	1,420	
Fianna Fáil	Tom Clandillon		605	647	663	689	726	727	754	754	848	921		
Labour	Sean Wolohan		560	567	577	602	715	730	790	792	918	1,035	1,189	1,242
Independent	Denis Kinsella*		443	443	450	477	512	525	561	564				
Fine Gael	Philip Doyle		339	359	360	382	393							
Fine Gael	Oliver Merrigan		338	338	342	380	396	441	571	612	664			
Fine Gael	Margo Weadick*		320	321	325	389	411	437						
Labour	Paddy Kavanagh		311	319	324	344								
Fine Gael	Billy Briggs		278	279	281									
Labour	James Quigley		88											
Electorate: 13,219 Valid: 9,095 (69.81%) Spoilt: 123 Quota: 1,300 Turnout: 9,228

=== Baltinglass ===
Baltinglass: 3 seats
Party	Candidate	FPv%	Count							
Party	Candidate	FPv%	1	2	3	4	5	6	7	8
Fine Gael	Godfrey Timmins TD*		1,397							
Fianna Fáil	James Miley*		1,158	1,162	1,163	1,174	1,195	1,244	1,338	1,456
Fianna Fáil	Hugh O'Keeffe		888	895	897	910	921	934	994	1,154
Labour	Tommy Cullen		663	668	676	685	703	716	768	
Fine Gael	Pascal Deering*		501	524	527	539	571	731	775	978
Sinn Féin	Gerry O'Neill		315	316	317	322	340	353		
Fine Gael	Donal McEvoy		254	261	263	270	271			
Workers' Party	Maura Green		117	117	117	121				
Independent	Michael Scanlon		74	75	81					
Independent	Daniel Buckley		26	26						
Electorate: 8,047 Valid: 5,393 (67.91%) Spoilt: 72 Quota: 1,349 Turnout: 5,465

=== Bray ===
Bray: 6 seats
Party	Candidate	FPv%	Count									
Party	Candidate	FPv%	1	2	3	4	5	6	7	8	9	10
Workers' Party	Liz McManus		1,213									
Labour	John Byrne*		1,098	1,105	1,110	1,160						
Fianna Fáil	Ciarán Murphy*		1,073	1,081	1,087	1,099	1,126	1,129				
Fianna Fáil	Michael Lawlor		798	801	802	808	832	832	834	849	878	1,046
Fianna Fáil	Michael Ledwidge		721	725	728	742	753	756	767	811	831	1,052
Fine Gael	Mark Mortell		550	554	555	566	578	579	721	774	1,028	1,074
Fine Gael	Jane Murphy*		514	520	522	533	539	541	633	718	813	864
Fianna Fáil	Pat Vance		487	491	496	504	527	529	549	590	614	
Fine Gael	Michael Conlon		375	379	382	400	408	410	463	506		
Fine Gael	Pat McHugh		345	348	350	355	358	359				
Labour	Barbara Hyland		266	270	275	299	341	360	381			
Workers' Party	Dermot Tobin		182	200	256	263						
Labour	Nancy Mahony		174	176	178							
Workers' Party	Kathy Reen		87	106								
Electorate: 16,600 Valid: 7,883 (48.46%) Spoilt: 162 Quota: 1,127 Turnout: 8,045

=== Greystones ===
Greystones: 4 seats
Party	Candidate	FPv%	Count					
Party	Candidate	FPv%	1	2	3	4	5	6
Fianna Fáil	Johnny Fox*		1,823					
Fine Gael	George Jones*		1,113	1,186	1,213	1,346		
Fine Gael	John Leeson*		907	977	1,025	1,064	1,100	1,229
Fianna Fáil	Dick Roche		744	1,032	1,050	1,116	1,123	1,337
Independent	Jack Murnane		548	585	598	677	693	
Workers' Party	John McManus*		516	565	616	758	778	964
Labour	Charlie Keddy		448	472	553			
Labour	Tom Mulligan		214	249				
Electorate: 11,899 Valid: 6,333 (53.78%) Spoilt: 66 Quota: 1,267 Turnout: 6,399

=== Wicklow ===
Wicklow: 5 seats
Party	Candidate	FPv%	Count											
Party	Candidate	FPv%	1	2	3	4	5	6	7	8	9	10	11	12
Fianna Fáil	Joe Jacob		918	938	945	1,011	1,023	1,068	1,081	1,201	1,507			
Labour	Paddy Kavanagh		773	794	826	903	994	1,012	1,111	1,178	1,200	1,203	1,331	1,364
Independent	Susan Phillips		756	786	810	829	832	861	923	955	994	1,000	1,189	1,215
Fianna Fáil	John Giff*		680	692	735	745	753	764	818	908	1,241	1,350	1,495	
Labour	Frank Hynes*		664	677	692	715	826	834	857	973	996	999	1,183	1,203
Fianna Fáil	John Byrne		648	657	663	666	671	687	705	853				
Independent	Francis Doyle		617	651	704	724	746	768	813	854	888	902		
Fianna Fáil	Seamus Power		605	612	613	614	678	689	691					
Fine Gael	Harry Cullen*		578	585	589	611	622	860	1,049	1,070	1,119	1,127	1,184	1,186
Fine Gael	Nora Fitzpatrick		466	466	495	497	501	536						
Fine Gael	Andy Cullen		411	414	415	429	441							
Labour	James Gregory*		329	341	345	359								
Labour	Jimmy O'Shaughnessy		260	280	281									
Independent	Robert Kearns		245	257										
Workers' Party	Colm Kirwan		228											
Electorate: 13,089 Valid: 8,178 (63.28%) Spoilt: 105 Quota: 1,364 Turnout: 8,283
