= Andrew Doyle (politician) =

Irish former politician (born 1960)

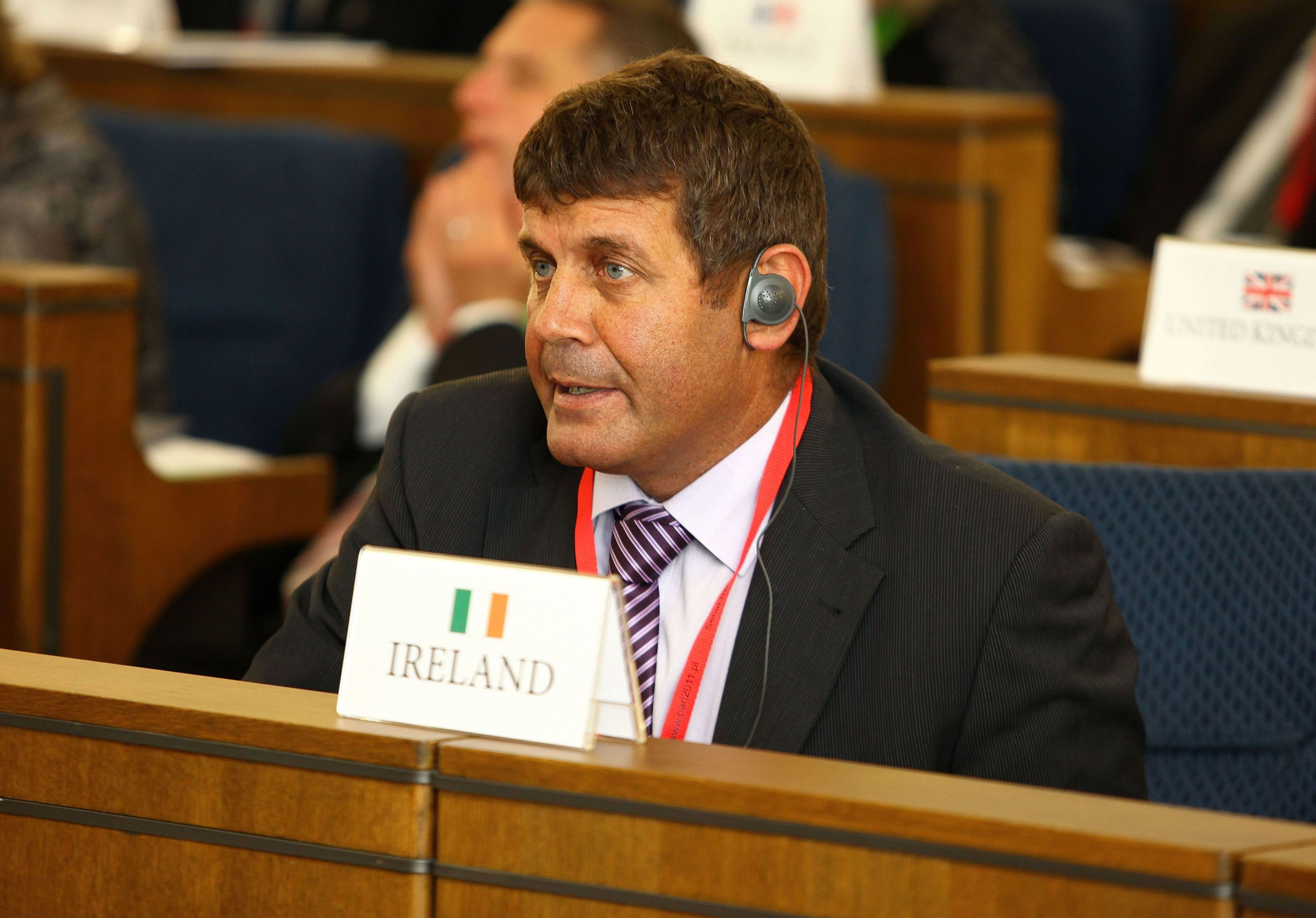
- Doyle in 2011

Minister of State
- 2016–2020: Agriculture, Food and the Marine

Teachta Dála
- In office May 2007 – February 2020
- Constituency: Wicklow

Wicklow County Councillor
- In office June 1999 – May 2007
- Constituency: Wicklow

Personal details
- Born: 2 July 1960 (age 66) Dublin, Ireland
- Party: Fine Gael
- Spouse: Ann Smith (m. 1988)
- Children: 4
- Education: Rockwell Agricultural College

Andrew Doyle (born 2 July 1960) is an Irish former Fine Gael politician who was a Teachta Dála (TD) for the Wicklow constituency from 2007 to 2020. He served as Minister of State at the Department of Agriculture, Food and the Marine from 2016 to 2020.

== Early life and education ==
Doyle graduated from Rockwell Agricultural College, in County Tipperary, in 1978, and as a young farmer in 1981, he won the Stephen Cullinane Scholarship to New Zealand, where he played rugby in Canterbury.

== Personal life ==
Doyle runs the family farm in County Wicklow, which has been in his family for six generations. He is married to Ann Smith and they have three sons and one daughter.

== Politics ==
He has been a member of Fine Gael since 1983, and first sought election to Wicklow County Council in the East Wicklow local electoral area, where he served from 1999 to 2007, and was chairman of the council from 2005 to 2006. He was elected to the Dáil, on his first attempt at the 2007 general election. During his first term in the Dáil, he was party Spokesperson on Agriculture, Fisheries and Food from July 2010 to March 2011, having previously served as deputy Spokesperson on Agriculture, with special responsibility for Food and Horticulture from 2007 to 2010. He was re-elected to the 31st Dáil at the 2011 general election, topping the poll in the constituency, and was elected for the third time at the 2016 general election.

Doyle introduced two private member's bills in the Dáil. He introduced the Food (Fair Trade and Information) Bill 2009 to provide in the interests of the common good for the prohibition of activities which prevent, restrict or distort fair trade in grocery goods in the State. He also introduced the Electoral (Amendment) (Hours of Polling) Bill 2013, to set voting hours for Dáil elections, Dáil by-elections, Presidential elections, European Parliament elections, Local Government elections and Referendums. Neither bill was enacted.

As chairperson of the Oireachtas Joint Committee on Agriculture, Food, and the Marine, he also produced the first parliamentary report on the Offshore Oil and Gas sector in 2012, which called for a new fiscal licensing regime in Offshore Oil and Gas exploration off the coast of Ireland. As part of the Irish Presidency of the Council of the European Union in 2013, he hosted a conference in Dublin Castle with EU member states Parliamentary Agriculture Committee Chairs from all 27 countries, engaging parliamentarians with speakers such as the European Commissioner for Agriculture, and then Romanian Prime Minister, Dacian Cioloș and the European Commissioner for Fisheries, Maria Damanaki.

In the 2016 general election, Doyle won the fourth seat in Wicklow. On 19 May 2016, he was appointed by the minority Fine Gael–Independent government on the nomination of Taoiseach Enda Kenny as Minister of State at the Department of Agriculture, Food and the Marine with special responsibility for Food, Forestry and Horticulture. He was appointed to the same position on 20 June 2017 when Leo Varadkar formed a new government after succeeding Kenny as Fine Gael leader.

He lost his seat at the general election on 8 February 2020, and continued to serve as a minister of state until the formation of a new government on 27 June 2020.

Dáil	Election	Deputy (Party)	Deputy (Party)	Deputy (Party)	Deputy (Party)	Deputy (Party)
4th	1923	Christopher Byrne (CnaG)	James Everett (Lab)	Richard Wilson (FP)	3 seats 1923–1981	
5th	1927 (Jun)	Séamus Moore (FF)	James Everett (Lab)	Dermot O'Mahony (CnaG)	3 seats 1923–1981	
6th	1927 (Sep)	Séamus Moore (FF)	James Everett (Lab)	Dermot O'Mahony (CnaG)	3 seats 1923–1981	
7th	1932	Séamus Moore (FF)	James Everett (Lab)	Dermot O'Mahony (CnaG)	3 seats 1923–1981	
8th	1933	Séamus Moore (FF)	James Everett (Lab)	Dermot O'Mahony (CnaG)	3 seats 1923–1981	
9th	1937	Séamus Moore (FF)	James Everett (Lab)	Dermot O'Mahony (FG)	3 seats 1923–1981	
10th	1938	Séamus Moore (FF)	James Everett (Lab)	Patrick Cogan (Ind.)	3 seats 1923–1981	
11th	1943	Christopher Byrne (FF)	James Everett (Lab)	Patrick Cogan (CnaT)	3 seats 1923–1981	
12th	1944	Thomas Brennan (FF)	James Everett (NLP)	Patrick Cogan (CnaT)	3 seats 1923–1981	
13th	1948	Thomas Brennan (FF)	James Everett (NLP)	Patrick Cogan (Ind.)	3 seats 1923–1981	
14th	1951	Thomas Brennan (FF)	James Everett (Lab)	Patrick Cogan (Ind.)	3 seats 1923–1981	
14th	1953 by-election	Mark Deering (FG)	James Everett (Lab)	Patrick Cogan (Ind.)	3 seats 1923–1981	
15th	1954	Mark Deering (FG)	James Everett (Lab)	Paudge Brennan (FF)	3 seats 1923–1981	
16th	1957	James O'Toole (FF)	James Everett (Lab)	Paudge Brennan (FF)	3 seats 1923–1981	
17th	1961	Michael O'Higgins (FG)	James Everett (Lab)	Paudge Brennan (FF)	3 seats 1923–1981	
18th	1965	Michael O'Higgins (FG)	James Everett (Lab)	Paudge Brennan (FF)	3 seats 1923–1981	
18th	1968 by-election	Michael O'Higgins (FG)	Godfrey Timmins (FG)	Paudge Brennan (FF)	3 seats 1923–1981	
19th	1969	Liam Kavanagh (Lab)	Godfrey Timmins (FG)	Paudge Brennan (FF)	3 seats 1923–1981	
20th	1973	Liam Kavanagh (Lab)	Godfrey Timmins (FG)	Ciarán Murphy (FF)	3 seats 1923–1981	
21st	1977	Liam Kavanagh (Lab)	Godfrey Timmins (FG)	Ciarán Murphy (FF)	3 seats 1923–1981	
22nd	1981	Liam Kavanagh (Lab)	Godfrey Timmins (FG)	Ciarán Murphy (FF)	Paudge Brennan (FF)	4 seats 1981–1992
23rd	1982 (Feb)	Liam Kavanagh (Lab)	Godfrey Timmins (FG)	Ciarán Murphy (FF)	Gemma Hussey (FG)	4 seats 1981–1992
24th	1982 (Nov)	Liam Kavanagh (Lab)	Godfrey Timmins (FG)	Paudge Brennan (FF)	Gemma Hussey (FG)	4 seats 1981–1992
25th	1987	Liam Kavanagh (Lab)	Joe Jacob (FF)	Dick Roche (FF)	Gemma Hussey (FG)	4 seats 1981–1992
26th	1989	Liam Kavanagh (Lab)	Joe Jacob (FF)	Dick Roche (FF)	Godfrey Timmins (FG)	4 seats 1981–1992
27th	1992	Liam Kavanagh (Lab)	Joe Jacob (FF)	Liz McManus (DL)	Godfrey Timmins (FG)	Johnny Fox (Ind.)
27th	1995 by-election	Liam Kavanagh (Lab)	Joe Jacob (FF)	Liz McManus (DL)	Godfrey Timmins (FG)	Mildred Fox (Ind.)
28th	1997	Dick Roche (FF)	Joe Jacob (FF)	Liz McManus (DL)	Billy Timmins (FG)	Mildred Fox (Ind.)
29th	2002	Dick Roche (FF)	Joe Jacob (FF)	Liz McManus (Lab)	Billy Timmins (FG)	Mildred Fox (Ind.)
30th	2007	Dick Roche (FF)	Joe Behan (FF)	Liz McManus (Lab)	Billy Timmins (FG)	Andrew Doyle (FG)
31st	2011	Simon Harris (FG)	Stephen Donnelly (Ind.)	Anne Ferris (Lab)	Billy Timmins (FG)	Andrew Doyle (FG)
32nd	2016	Simon Harris (FG)	Stephen Donnelly (SD)	John Brady (SF)	Pat Casey (FF)	Andrew Doyle (FG)
33rd	2020	Simon Harris (FG)	Stephen Donnelly (FF)	John Brady (SF)	Jennifer Whitmore (SD)	Steven Matthews (GP)
34th	2024	Simon Harris (FG)	Edward Timmins (FG)	John Brady (SF)	Jennifer Whitmore (SD)	4 seats since 2024
