= 2024 Wicklow County Council election =

Part of the 2024 Irish local elections

- 7 June 2024

All 32 seats on Wicklow County Council 17 seats needed for a majority
- Turnout: 54%
	First party	Second party	Third party
Party	Fine Gael	Fianna Fáil	Social Democrats
Seats won	9	4	3
Seat change	0	▼3	▲2
	Fourth party	Fifth party	Sixth party
Party	Sinn Féin	Green	Labour
Seats won	2	2	1
Seat change	0	0	▼1
	Seventh party	Eighth party
Party	Independent Ireland	Independent
Seats won	1	10
Seat change	▲1	▲1
- Area of Wicklow County Council

An election to all 32 seats on Wicklow County Council was held on 7 June 2024 as part of the 2024 Irish local elections. County Wicklow is divided into 6 local electoral areas (LEAs) to elect councillors for a five-year term of office on the electoral system of proportional representation by means of the single transferable vote (PR-STV).

The period for nominations opened at 10 a.m. on Saturday 11 May and closed at 12 p.m. on Saturday 18 May 2024.

== Retiring incumbents ==
The following councillors were not seeking re-election:

Constituency	Departing Councillor	Party
Baltinglass	Vincent Blake	Fine Gael
Wicklow	Shay Cullen	Fine Gael
Greystones	Derek Mitchell	Fine Gael
Bray West	Rory O'Connor	Independent
Greystones	Gerry Walsh	Fianna Fáil
Wicklow	Irene Winters	Fine Gael

== Results by party ==
Party	Candidates	Seats	±	1st pref	FPv%	±%
Fine Gael	11	9	0	12,499	21.29%	▼4.89%
Fianna Fáil	10	4	▼3	10,595	18.05%	▼4.01%
Social Democrats	5	3	▲2	4,524	7.71%	▲2.42%
Sinn Féin	11	2	0	5,092	8.67%	▲0.86%
Green	4	2	0	2,686	4.57%	▼4.01%
Labour	4	1	▼1	2,168	3.69%	▼0.94%
Independent Ireland	3	▲1	New	1,522	2.59%	New
People Before Profit	4	0	0	943	1.61%	▲0.11%
Aontú	1	0	0	424	0.72%	▼0.40%
Irish Freedom	1	0	New	288	0.49%	New
The Irish People	1	0	New	162	0.28%	New
Independent	19	10	▲1	17,806	30.33%	▲3.92%
Total	74	32	0	58,711	100.00%	—N/a

== Results by LEA ==
*: Outgoing councillor elected in 2019.
†: Outgoing councillor coopted subsequent to the 2019 election.
‡: Outgoing councillor co-opted in 2024 for Bray East now contesting in Bray West.

=== Arklow ===
Arklow: 6 seats
Party	Candidate	FPv%	Count							
Party	Candidate	FPv%	1	2	3	4	5	6	7	8
Fianna Fáil	Pat Kennedy	27.18%	2,791							
Independent	Peir Leonard	19.72%	2,025							
Fine Gael	Sylvester Bourke	9.14%	938	1,192	1,243	1,266	1,286	1,613		
Fianna Fáil	Pat Fitzgerald	9.89%	1,016	1,219	1,303	1,317	1,347	1,371	1,395	1,435
Sinn Féin	Warren O'Toole	6.90%	709	796	872	921	1,308	1,331	1,337	1,431
Independent	Miriam Murphy	5.00%	513	702	835	947	998	1,078	1,121	1,325
Fianna Fáil	Tommy Annesley	5.75%	590	833	894	915	942	986	1,045	1,090
Independent Ireland	David O'Gorman	4.85%	498	556	603	649	665	692	706	
Fine Gael	Laurie Kearon	3.94%	405	590	605	627	637			
Sinn Féin	Sheila Busher	4.17%	428	502	540	611				
People Before Profit	Lorraine Farrell	2.23%	229	247	275					
Independent	Viktoria Bodley	1.23%	126	139	164					
Electorate: 19,259 Valid: 10,268 Spoilt: 141 Quota: 1,467 Turnout: 10,409 (54.05%)

=== Baltinglass ===
Baltinglass: 6 seats
Party	Candidate	FPv%	Count									
Party	Candidate	FPv%	1	2	3	4	5	6	7	8	9	10
Independent	Gerry O'Neill	18.05%	2,013									
Fine Gael	Edward Timmins	14.22%	1,586	1,641								
Fine Gael	Peter Stapleton	12.31%	1,373	1,381	1,384	1,411	1,412	1,461	1,472	1,571	2,187	
Fine Gael	Avril Cronin	10.06%	1,122	1,144	1,148	1,157	1,171	1,345	1,356	1,395	1,435	1,543
Fianna Fáil	Patsy Glennon	7.08%	790	868	868	875	892	1,131	1,148	1,174	1,323	1,418
Independent	Jason Mulhall	6.47%	722	807	838	887	903	939	941	1,103	1,204	1,322
Social Democrats	Deirdre McCormack	7.00%	781	844	847	917	944	984	986	1,135	1,170	1,199
Fianna Fáil	John Mullen	8.08%	901	903	904	924	926	992	992	1,097		
Sinn Féin	Aidan Kinsella	5.59%	620	628	629	661	889	913	915			
Fianna Fáil	Kieran Burke	5.87%	655	692	692	699	712					
Sinn Féin	Connor Byrne	2.58%	288	318	322	337						
People Before Profit	Anthony McNulty	2.29%	255	263	266							
Independent	Dominic Plant	0.43%	48	71								
Electorate: 20,661 Valid: 11,154 Spoilt: 115 Quota: 1,594 Turnout: 11,269 (54.54%)

=== Bray East ===
Bray East: 4 seats
Party	Candidate	FPv%	Count						
Party	Candidate	FPv%	1	2	3	4	5	6	7
Fine Gael	Aoife Flynn Kennedy	17.16%	1,114	1,125	1,179	1,207	1,438		
Green	Erika Doyle	14.79%	960	981	1,115	1,162	1,266	1,316	
Independent Ireland	Ian Neary	13.84%	898	981	1,000	1,134	1,166	1,181	1,256
Independent	Malachaí Duddy	9.46%	614	651	691	836	889	923	1,063
Sinn Féin	Denise Cahill	10.86%	705	745	799	836	854	859	1,011
Labour	Anne Ferris	7.52%	488	507	594	613	662	697	
Fianna Fáil	Fergal Fitzgerald Doyle	8.57%	556	560	581	611			
Aontú	Ciaran Hogan	6.53%	424	452	471				
Social Democrats	Aaron McAllorum	6.19%	402	450					
The Irish People	Finnian Cremins	2.50%	162						
People Before Profit	Frank Hayes	2.05%	133						
Independent	Lee Donnelly	0.52%	34						
Electorate: 12,273 Valid: 6,490 Spoilt: 66 Quota: 1,299 Turnout: 6,556 (53.42%)

=== Bray West ===
Bray West: 4 seats
Party	Candidate	FPv%	Count							
Party	Candidate	FPv%	1	2	3	4	5	6	7	8
Independent	Joe Behan	34.40%	2,449							
Fine Gael	Melanie Corrigan	24.47%	1,742							
Social Democrats	Caroline Winstanley	7.21%	513	701	761	782	908	954	1,036	1,463
Sinn Féin	Dermot O’Brien	7.97%	567	753	765	782	815	1,119	1,167	1,221
Independent	Rob Carry	6.57%	468	663	675	694	716	735	874	932
Green	Alex Pigot	5.35%	381	454	549	558	648	660	780	
Independent	Keith Manning	5.00%	356	454	522	542	577	600		
Sinn Féin	Mick Ryan	4.65%	331	431	442	448	482			
Labour	Bryan Kenna	3.53%	251	381	435	443				
Independent	Colm Flood	0.86%	61	116	122					
Electorate: 13,461 Valid: 7,119 Spoilt: 48 Quota: 1,424 Turnout: 7,167 (53.24%)

=== Greystones ===
Greystones: 6 seats
Party	Candidate	FPv%	Count										
Party	Candidate	FPv%	1	2	3	4	5	6	7	8	9	10	11
Independent	Stephen Stokes	18.09%	2,059										
Independent	Tom Fortune	12.48%	1,421	1,497	1,537	1,553	1,640						
Fine Gael	Louise Fenelon Gaskin	11.28%	1,284	1,320	1,325	1,326	1,328	1,331	1,375	1,384	1,384	1,794	
Independent	Orla Finn	11.15%	1,269	1,340	1,352	1,360	1,431	1,470	1,535	1,613	1,625	1,679	
Social Democrats	Mark Barry	9.46%	1,077	1,139	1,141	1,156	1,161	1,247	1,383	1,503	1,503	1,531	1,564
Green	Lourda Scott	9.26%	1,054	1,110	1,115	1,118	1,124	1,183	1,300	1,353	1,354	1,420	1,469
Fianna Fáil	Jack Commons	9.14%	1,041	1,089	1,091	1,099	1,108	1,123	1,152	1,189	1,190	1,242	1,328
Fine Gael	Aileen Lennon	5.12%	583	603	604	606	607	611	632	644	644		
Sinn Féin	Esther Kelly	2.18%	248	255	261	436	449	501	526				
Labour	Anne Waithira Burke	3.37%	384	402	406	412	412	467					
People Before Profit	Kellie McConnell	2.87%	326	339	341	346	354						
Irish Freedom	Anthony Goldsmith	2.53%	288	296	316	320							
Sinn Féin	Brian Fogarty	2.07%	236	246	248								
Independent	Charlie Keddy	0.95%	108	118									
Electorate: 21,035 Valid: 11,380 Spoilt: 107 Quota: 1,626 Turnout: 11,487 (54.60%)

=== Wicklow ===
Wicklow: 6 seats
Party	Candidate	FPv%	Count								
Party	Candidate	FPv%	1	2	3	4	5	6	7	8	9
Independent	John Snell	17.22%	2,118								
Social Democrats	Danny Alvey	14.24%	1,751	1,780							
Labour	Paul O'Brien	8.50%	1,045	1,091	1,101	1,163	1,195	1,348	1,351	1,549	1,668
Fianna Fáil	Gail Dunne	10.54%	1,297	1,332	1,337	1,352	1,372	1,491	1,494	1,600	1,637
Fine Gael	Shane Langrell	11.19%	1,376	1,389	1,396	1,436	1,452	1,504	1,508	1,542	1,584
Fine Gael	Graham Richmond	7.93%	976	991	999	1,043	1,062	1,161	1,162	1,192	1,218
Fianna Fáil	Sonia Casey-Shortt	7.79%	958	974	976	1,005	1,021	1,060	1,063	1,105	1,164
Independent	John Larkin	6.19%	761	831	858	862	872	964	966	1,049	
Sinn Féin	Anthony Hill	4.47%	550	573	577	586	873	956	958		
Independent	Mary Kavanagh	5.21%	641	693	738	776	797				
Sinn Féin	Abbie O'Loughlin	3.33%	410	445	449	467					
Green	Mia Fahey McCarthy	2.37%	291	294	297						
Independent Ireland	Tim Kavanagh	1.00%	126	149							
Electorate: 23,378 Valid: 12,300 Spoilt: 123 Quota: 1,758 Turnout: 12,423 (53.14%)

== Changes ==
=== Co-options ===
Party	Outgoing	LEA	Reason	Date	Co-optee
Fine Gael	Edward Timmins	Baltinglass	Elected to 34th Dáil for Wicklow at the 2024 general election	18 December 2024	Pat Mahon
Fine Gael	Aoife Flynn-Kennedy	Bray East	Resignation.	March 2025	Ned Whelan
Sinn Féin	Dermot O'Brien	Bray West	Resignation.	6 May 2026	John Ward

== Sources ==
- Buchanan, Myles; Galvin, Tom; Mac Raghnaill, Eoin (29 March 2024). "Wicklow Local Elections 2024 candidates: get the latest running news". Wicklow People – via Irish Independent.
- "Wicklow Local Election 2024". Irish Freedom Party. 27 February 2024.
- "Local Election Candidates 2024 - Leinster". Independent Ireland.
