= Mildred Fox =

Irish former politician (born 1971)

Teachta Dála
- In office June 1995 – May 2007
- Constituency: Wicklow

Personal details
- Born: 17 June 1971 (age 55) County Wicklow, Ireland
- Party: Independent
- Spouse: Daryl Tighe
- Children: 4
- Parent: Johnny Fox (father)
- Education: University College Dublin

Mildred Fox (born 17 June 1971) is an Irish former independent politician. She was a Teachta Dála (TD) for the Wicklow constituency from 1995 to 2007.

== Private life ==
She was educated at St. Kilian's Community School in Bray and is a graduate of University College Dublin holding a BA degree. Before becoming a TD, she worked as a hotel manager. She is married to Daryl Tighe, and they have four children.

== Political career ==
During the 1997 to 2002 Dáil she gained some notability as she, and other independent TDs, supported the government which otherwise would not have had an overall majority. Before and after this period she was little known outside Wicklow. She was also a member of Wicklow County Council from 1995 to 2003, when she vacated her seat in favour of her brother, Christopher, when the dual mandate ended.

She was first elected to the 27th Dáil at the Wicklow by-election in June 1995 following the death of her father, sitting independent TD Johnny Fox. She was re-elected at the 1997 general election and again at the 2002 general election. On both occasions, she was the last candidate to reach the quota. In 2002 she was elected by an extremely narrow margin of 19 votes over the Labour Party candidate Nicky Kelly. She retired at the 2007 general election. Fox wished to spend more time with her children, telling The Irish Times in 2010 that "the family had to come first".

After retiring from politics, Fox started an ice cream business, and has volunteered at a local charity shop. She sings with the country band The Whipperwills and the folk duo Hidden Stills.

Honorary titles
| Preceded by Mary Coughlan | Baby of the Dáil; 1995–1997 | Succeeded by Denis Naughten |

| Dáil | Election | Deputy (Party) | Deputy (Party) | Deputy (Party) | Deputy (Party) | Deputy (Party) |
|---|---|---|---|---|---|---|
| 4th | 1923 | Christopher Byrne (CnaG) | James Everett (Lab) | Richard Wilson (FP) | 3 seats 1923–1981 | |
| 5th | 1927 (Jun) | Séamus Moore (FF) | James Everett (Lab) | Dermot O'Mahony (CnaG) | 3 seats 1923–1981 | |
| 6th | 1927 (Sep) | Séamus Moore (FF) | James Everett (Lab) | Dermot O'Mahony (CnaG) | 3 seats 1923–1981 | |
| 7th | 1932 | Séamus Moore (FF) | James Everett (Lab) | Dermot O'Mahony (CnaG) | 3 seats 1923–1981 | |
| 8th | 1933 | Séamus Moore (FF) | James Everett (Lab) | Dermot O'Mahony (CnaG) | 3 seats 1923–1981 | |
| 9th | 1937 | Séamus Moore (FF) | James Everett (Lab) | Dermot O'Mahony (FG) | 3 seats 1923–1981 | |
| 10th | 1938 | Séamus Moore (FF) | James Everett (Lab) | Patrick Cogan (Ind.) | 3 seats 1923–1981 | |
| 11th | 1943 | Christopher Byrne (FF) | James Everett (Lab) | Patrick Cogan (CnaT) | 3 seats 1923–1981 | |
| 12th | 1944 | Thomas Brennan (FF) | James Everett (NLP) | Patrick Cogan (CnaT) | 3 seats 1923–1981 | |
| 13th | 1948 | Thomas Brennan (FF) | James Everett (NLP) | Patrick Cogan (Ind.) | 3 seats 1923–1981 | |
| 14th | 1951 | Thomas Brennan (FF) | James Everett (Lab) | Patrick Cogan (Ind.) | 3 seats 1923–1981 | |
| 14th | 1953 by-election | Mark Deering (FG) | James Everett (Lab) | Patrick Cogan (Ind.) | 3 seats 1923–1981 | |
| 15th | 1954 | Mark Deering (FG) | James Everett (Lab) | Paudge Brennan (FF) | 3 seats 1923–1981 | |
| 16th | 1957 | James O'Toole (FF) | James Everett (Lab) | Paudge Brennan (FF) | 3 seats 1923–1981 | |
| 17th | 1961 | Michael O'Higgins (FG) | James Everett (Lab) | Paudge Brennan (FF) | 3 seats 1923–1981 | |
| 18th | 1965 | Michael O'Higgins (FG) | James Everett (Lab) | Paudge Brennan (FF) | 3 seats 1923–1981 | |
| 18th | 1968 by-election | Michael O'Higgins (FG) | Godfrey Timmins (FG) | Paudge Brennan (FF) | 3 seats 1923–1981 | |
| 19th | 1969 | Liam Kavanagh (Lab) | Godfrey Timmins (FG) | Paudge Brennan (FF) | 3 seats 1923–1981 | |
| 20th | 1973 | Liam Kavanagh (Lab) | Godfrey Timmins (FG) | Ciarán Murphy (FF) | 3 seats 1923–1981 | |
| 21st | 1977 | Liam Kavanagh (Lab) | Godfrey Timmins (FG) | Ciarán Murphy (FF) | 3 seats 1923–1981 | |
| 22nd | 1981 | Liam Kavanagh (Lab) | Godfrey Timmins (FG) | Ciarán Murphy (FF) | Paudge Brennan (FF) | 4 seats 1981–1992 |
| 23rd | 1982 (Feb) | Liam Kavanagh (Lab) | Godfrey Timmins (FG) | Ciarán Murphy (FF) | Gemma Hussey (FG) | 4 seats 1981–1992 |
| 24th | 1982 (Nov) | Liam Kavanagh (Lab) | Godfrey Timmins (FG) | Paudge Brennan (FF) | Gemma Hussey (FG) | 4 seats 1981–1992 |
| 25th | 1987 | Liam Kavanagh (Lab) | Joe Jacob (FF) | Dick Roche (FF) | Gemma Hussey (FG) | 4 seats 1981–1992 |
| 26th | 1989 | Liam Kavanagh (Lab) | Joe Jacob (FF) | Dick Roche (FF) | Godfrey Timmins (FG) | 4 seats 1981–1992 |
| 27th | 1992 | Liam Kavanagh (Lab) | Joe Jacob (FF) | Liz McManus (DL) | Godfrey Timmins (FG) | Johnny Fox (Ind.) |
| 27th | 1995 by-election | Liam Kavanagh (Lab) | Joe Jacob (FF) | Liz McManus (DL) | Godfrey Timmins (FG) | Mildred Fox (Ind.) |
| 28th | 1997 | Dick Roche (FF) | Joe Jacob (FF) | Liz McManus (DL) | Billy Timmins (FG) | Mildred Fox (Ind.) |
| 29th | 2002 | Dick Roche (FF) | Joe Jacob (FF) | Liz McManus (Lab) | Billy Timmins (FG) | Mildred Fox (Ind.) |
| 30th | 2007 | Dick Roche (FF) | Joe Behan (FF) | Liz McManus (Lab) | Billy Timmins (FG) | Andrew Doyle (FG) |
| 31st | 2011 | Simon Harris (FG) | Stephen Donnelly (Ind.) | Anne Ferris (Lab) | Billy Timmins (FG) | Andrew Doyle (FG) |
| 32nd | 2016 | Simon Harris (FG) | Stephen Donnelly (SD) | John Brady (SF) | Pat Casey (FF) | Andrew Doyle (FG) |
| 33rd | 2020 | Simon Harris (FG) | Stephen Donnelly (FF) | John Brady (SF) | Jennifer Whitmore (SD) | Steven Matthews (GP) |
| 34th | 2024 | Simon Harris (FG) | Edward Timmins (FG) | John Brady (SF) | Jennifer Whitmore (SD) | 4 seats since 2024 |
