= County Buildings, Wicklow =

Municipal building in County Wicklow, Ireland

- Áras an Chontae, Cill Mhantáin
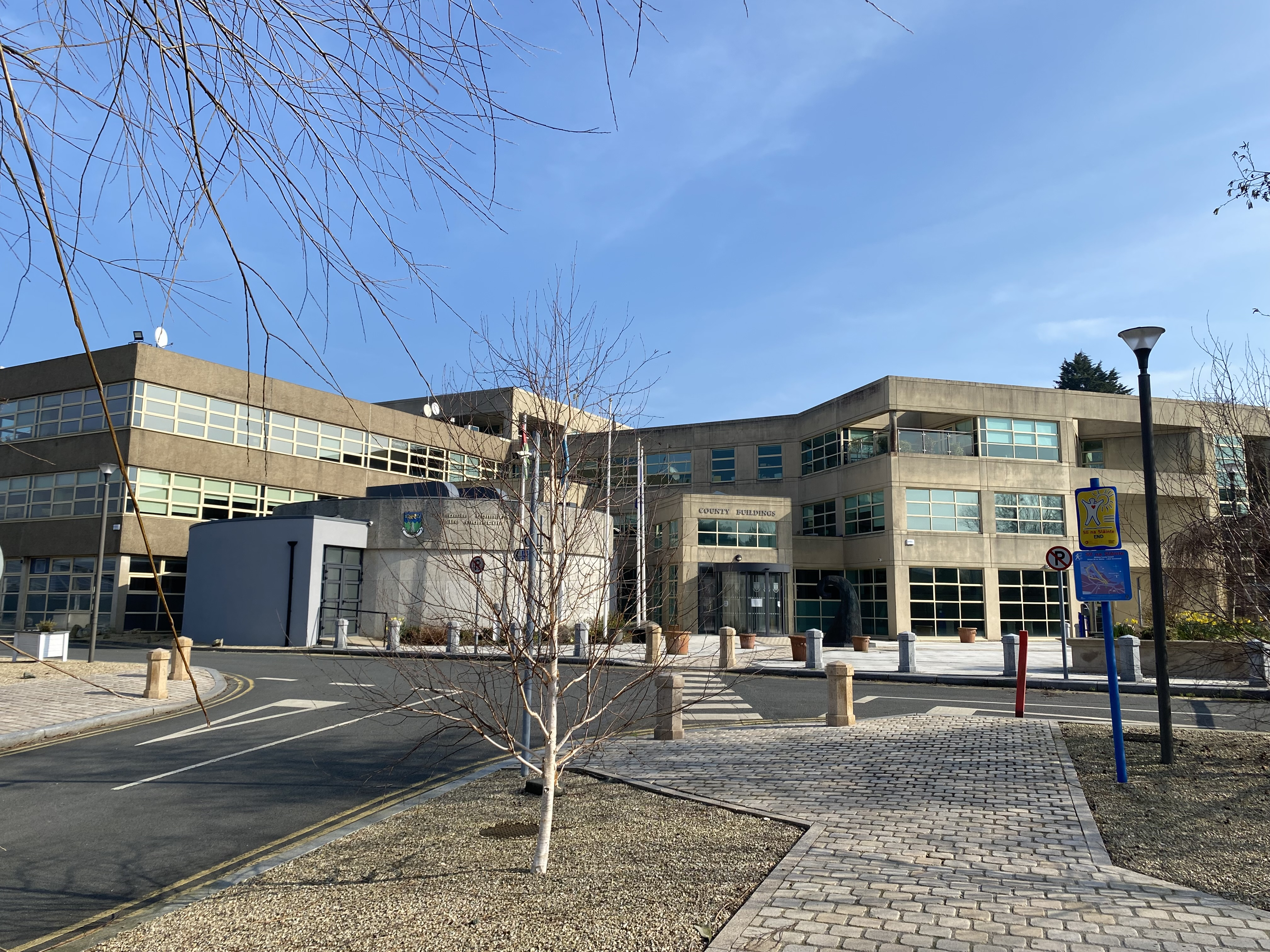
- County Buildings in March 2025

- Location within Ireland

General information
- Architectural style: Brutalist style
- Location: Wicklow, County Wicklow, Ireland
- Coordinates: 52.9856°N 6.0505°W
- Completed: 1977

County Buildings (Irish: Áras an Chontae, Cill Mhantáin) is a municipal facility in Whitegates, Wicklow, County Wicklow, Ireland.

== History ==
Originally Wicklow County Council held its meetings in Wicklow Courthouse. The county council moved a new facility, designed in the brutalist style, built in concrete and glass, and known as County Buildings, in 1977. The new building was extended to take on a cruciform shape in 1999 and extended again to a design by the Building Design Partnership in 2006. A customer care unit, introducing touchscreen technology, was created in the foyer of the county buildings in spring 2019.
