= Wicklow Courthouse =

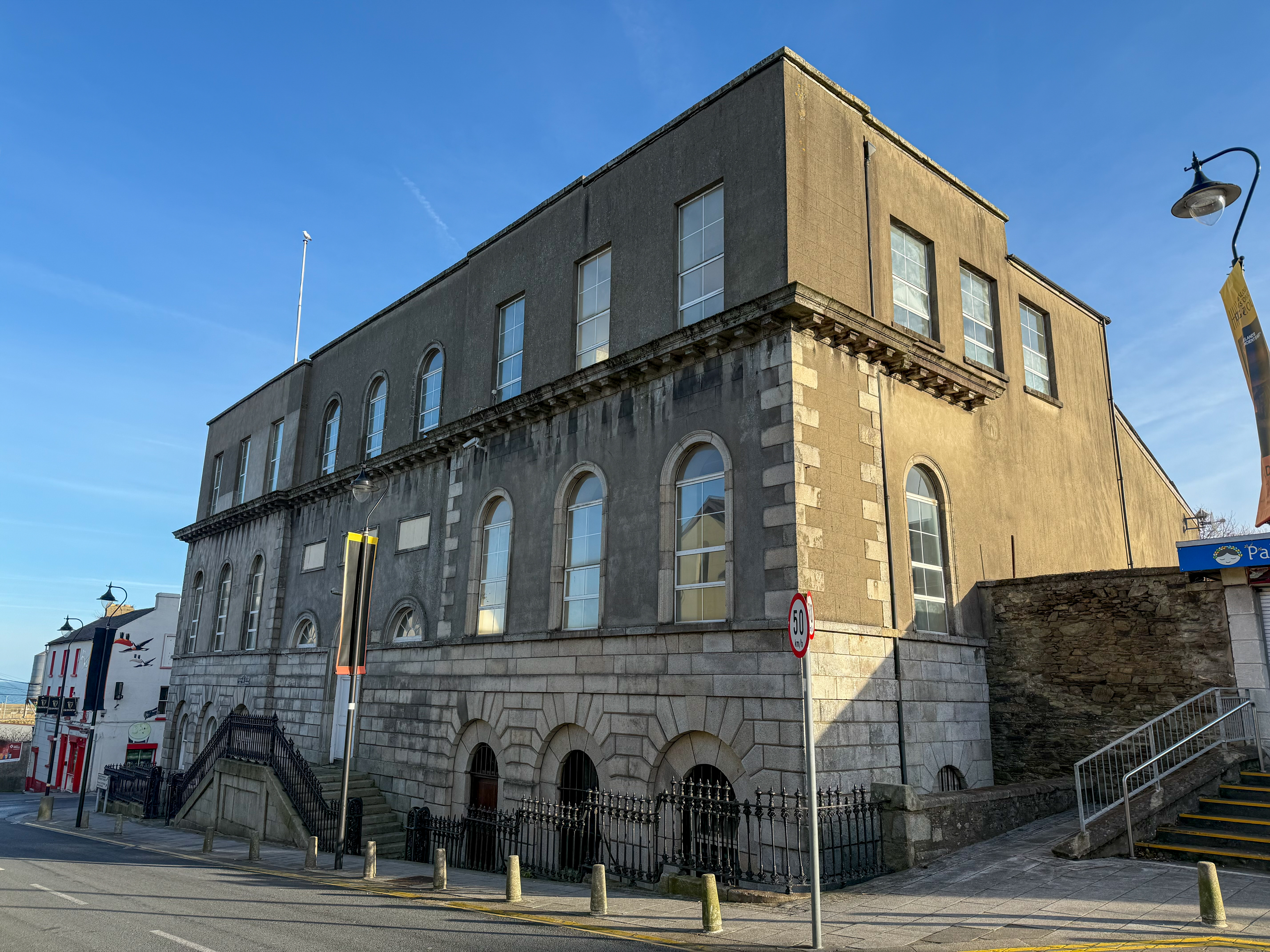
- Wicklow Courthouse in 2026

- Location within Ireland

General information
- Architectural style: Neoclassical style
- Location: Wicklow, County Wicklow, Ireland
- Coordinates: 52.9795°N 6.0375°W
- Completed: 1824

Wicklow Courthouse is a judicial facility in Wicklow, County Wicklow, Ireland.

== History ==
The courthouse, which was designed in the neoclassical style and built in ashlar stone, was completed in 1824. It was altered to the designs of Henry Brett, County Surveyor, in 1866 and altered again to the designs of John Henry Brett, his son, in 1876. The design involved a symmetrical main frontage of nine bays facing onto the Market Square; the central section of three bays featured a Perron staircase leading up to a doorway; there were three blank panels on the first floor and three round headed windows on the second floor.

The building was originally used as a facility for dispensing justice but, following the implementation of the Local Government (Ireland) Act 1898, which established county councils in every county, it also became the meeting place for Wicklow County Council. The county council moved to a new facility, known as County Buildings, in 1977. After judicial hearings were moved to other county courthouses due to the poor state of repair of the Wicklow Courthouse, it was closed in 2010.
