= Nicky Kelly =

Irish politician

Wicklow County Councillor
- In office 1999–2014
- Constituency: Arklow

Personal details
- Born: 9 January 1951 (age 75) Graiguenamanagh, County Kilkenny, Ireland
- Party: Independent
- Other political affiliations: Official Sinn Féin (1970–1974); Irish Republican Socialist Party (1974–1978); Labour Party (2001–2011)

Edward Noel Kelly (born 9 January 1951), known as Nicky Kelly, is an Irish politician from Arklow in County Wicklow. He was born in Graiguenamanagh, County Kilkenny. A member of Official Sinn Féin, later on he left it to join the new Irish Republican Socialist Party (IRSP) in 1974.

== Imprisonment and release ==
In 1978, he was sentenced to 12 years in prison for his alleged part in the Sallins Train Robbery. The ensuing campaign to release him became a symbol of the 1980s with 'Free Nicky Kelly' graffiti posted throughout the country. The evidence of torture committed against him and his two co-accused, Osgur Breatnach and Brian McNally, galvanised a campaign for his release. There was a dedication to him in the 1983 Planxty album, Words & Music.

Pat McCartan, who later became a TD for the Workers' Party, acted as his solicitor at this time, despite being on the opposing side in the SFWP–IRSP split.

In 1984, Kelly was released on humanitarian grounds. He received a presidential pardon in 1992, along with over IR£1 million as compensation following campaigns by Amnesty International and the Irish Council for Civil Liberties.

The events of Kelly's arrest and trial(s) were the subject of an edition of the RTÉ Television documentary series Scannal, broadcast on 22 September 2014.

== Political career ==
Kelly was elected to Arklow Town Council in 1991 and to Wicklow County Council in 1999. In 2001 he joined the Labour Party.

In 2008, he was elected mayor of Arklow.

He stood unsuccessfully as a Labour party candidate for the Wicklow constituency at the 2002 general election where he was beaten to the final seat by Mildred Fox by 19 votes, and in the 2007 general election, where his first-preference vote declined from 12% in 2002 to 6%. In early 2011, he left the Labour Party after a dispute about candidate selection at the party's convention. Despite rumours that he intended to join Sinn Féin or the United Left Alliance he stood at the 2011 general election as an independent candidate in the Wicklow constituency. He was not elected, receiving only 0.7% of the first-preference vote.

He lost his seat at the 2014 local elections.
