= 1979 Wicklow County Council election =

Part of the 1979 Irish local elections

- 7 June 1979

All 21 seats on Wicklow County Council
	First party	Second party	Third party
Party	Fianna Fáil	Fine Gael	Labour
Seats won	7	8	4
Seat change	▼2	▲2	Steady
	Fourth party	Fifth party
Party	Sinn Féin The Workers' Party	Independent
Seats won	1	1
Seat change	▲1	▼1
- Area of Wicklow County Council

An election to all 21 seats on Wicklow County Council took place on 7 June 1979 as part of the 1979 Irish local elections. County Wicklow was divided into 4 county electoral areas to elect councillors for a five-year term of office on the electoral system of proportional representation by means of the single transferable vote (PR-STV). The term was extended to 1985.

== Results by party ==
Party	Seats	±	1st pref	FPv%	±%
Fianna Fáil	7	▼2	11,079	35.37	
Fine Gael	8	▲2	9,834	26.66	
Labour	4	Steady	7,020	22.41	
Sinn Féin The Workers' Party	1	▲1	1,785	5.70	
Independent	1	▼1	1,330	4.25	
Total	21	Steady	31,322	100.00	—N/a

== Results by local electoral area ==
=== Arklow ===
Arklow: 5 seats
Party	Candidate	FPv%	Count	
Party	Candidate	FPv%	1	2
Fine Gael	Vincent Blake*	13.8%	1,135	
Labour	Kevin Ryan*	11.0%	906	
Fianna Fáil	Thomas Keenan*	10.0%	826	
Fianna Fáil	John Sweeney*	8.7%	720	
Fine Gael	Margo Weadick*	7.6%	726	
Labour	Sean Wolohan	6.3%	522	
Labour	Thomas King	5.9%	483	
Fianna Fáil	Patrick Timmins	5.6%	464	
Fianna Fáil	Tom Clandillon	5.6%	462	
Independent	Patrick Wadden	4.8%	399	
Fianna Fáil	James Fitzgerald	3.7%	306	
Fine Gael	Brian Culleton	3.0%	247	
Labour	Michael Murphy	2.1%	176	
Fine Gael	James Merrigan	1.4%	115	
Labour	John Hennessy	1.0%	82	
Electorate: 12,197 Valid: 8,244 (67.59%) Spoilt: 123 Quota: 1,178 Turnout: 8,425

=== Baltinglass ===
Baltinglass: 3 seats
Party	Candidate	FPv%	Count	
Party	Candidate	FPv%	1	2
Fine Gael	Godfrey Timmins TD*	34.1%	1,583	
Fianna Fáil	James Miley*	21.2%	982	
Fianna Fáil	J. Hobson	15.6%	725	
Fine Gael	Pascal Deering*	14.7%	681	
Fine Gael	Donal McEvoy	7.6%	353	
Fianna Fáil	P. Kennedy	6.8%	313	
Electorate: 7,159 Valid: 4,367 (61%) Spoilt: 55 Quota: 1,160 Turnout: 4,422

=== Bray ===
Bray: 7 seats
Party	Candidate	FPv%	Count	
Party	Candidate	FPv%	1	2
Sinn Féin The Workers' Party	John McManus*	15.0%	1,785	
Fianna Fáil	Ciaran Murphy*	14.1%	1,684	
Fine Gael	Aidan Murphy*	10.0%	1,199	
Fine Gael	John Leeson*	9.7%	1,161	
Labour	John Byrne*	8.3%	985	
Fine Gael	George Jones*	6.7%	799	
Labour	John Murnane	6.2%	740	
Fianna Fáil	Johnny Fox*	6.2%	738	
Fianna Fáil	Nancy O'Neill	5.4%	640	
Fine Gael	Jane Murphy	4.9%	583	
Fianna Fáil	Mary Ledwidge	4.9%	581	
Fine Gael	John Magennety	3.2%	383	
Fianna Fáil	Deirdre Dillon-Mallon	2.6%	309	
Labour	Nancy Mahony	2.1%	249	
Fianna Fáil	Joseph Melia	0.9%	102	
Electorate: 22,776 Valid: 11,938 (52.43%) Spoilt: 162 Quota: 1,493 Turnout: 12,055

=== Wicklow ===
Wicklow: 6 seats
Party	Candidate	FPv%	Count	
Party	Candidate	FPv%	1	2
Labour	Liam Kavanagh*	24.8%	1,679	
Fianna Fáil	Roger Miley*	9.6%	651	
Fine Gael	Harry Cullen*	9.1%	615	
Fianna Fáil	Jim Giff*	8.8%	598	
Fianna Fáil	Michael Cullen*	8.2%	556	
Labour	Frank Hynes*	7.5%	506	
Fianna Fáil	Seamus Power	6.2%	422	
Labour	James Gregory	6.0%	404	
Fine Gael	John Whelan	5.6%	382	
Fine Gael	Nora Fitzpatrick	5.5%	371	
Labour	Jimmy O'Shaughnessy	4.3%	288	
Independent	Basil Phelan	2.3%	157	
Fine Gael	Michael Miley	2.1%	144	
Electorate: 11,682 Valid: 8,178 (70.08%) Spoilt: 105 Quota: 1,129 Turnout: 6,912
