= Dick Roche =

Irish former politician (born 1947)

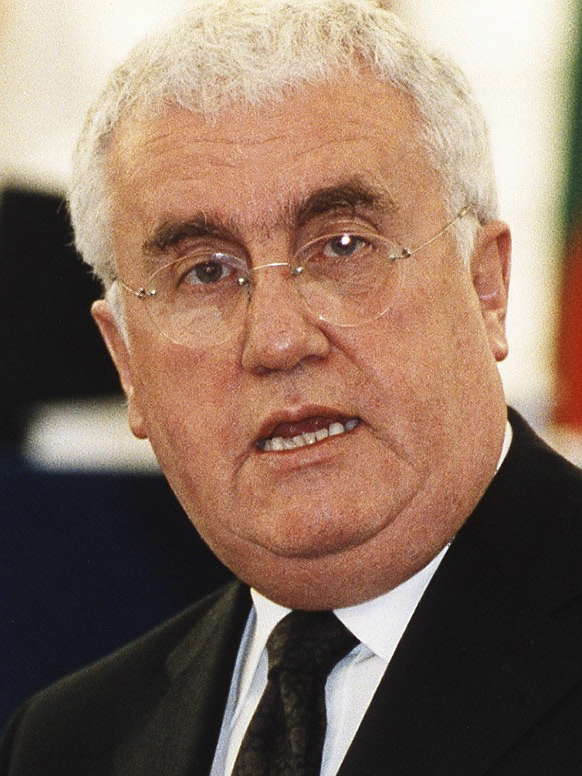
- Roche in 2004

Minister of State
- 2007–2011: European Affairs
- 2002–2004: European Affairs

Minister for the Environment, Heritage and Local Government
- In office 29 September 2004 – 14 June 2007
- Taoiseach: Bertie Ahern
- Preceded by: Martin Cullen
- Succeeded by: John Gormley

Teachta Dála
- In office June 1997 – February 2011
- In office February 1987 – November 1992
- Constituency: Wicklow

Senator
- In office 17 February 1993 – 6 June 1997
- Constituency: Administrative Panel
- In office 3 December 1992 – 17 February 1993
- Constituency: Nominated by the Taoiseach

Personal details
- Born: Richard Roche; 30 March 1947 (age 79) Wexford, Ireland
- Party: Fianna Fáil
- Spouse: Eleanor Griffin (m. 1976)
- Children: 4
- Education: University College Dublin

Richard Roche (born 30 March 1947) is an Irish former Fianna Fáil politician who served as Minister of State for European Affairs from 2002 to 2004 and 2007 to 2011 and Minister for the Environment, Heritage and Local Government from 2004 to 2007. He served as a Teachta Dála (TD) for the Wicklow constituency from 1987 to 1992 and 1997 to 2011. He was a Senator for the Administrative Panel from 1992 to 1997.

== Early and private life ==
Roche was born in Wexford. He was educated at Wexford Christian Brothers School and University College Dublin (UCD) where he received Bachelor of Commerce Degree and a master's degree in Public Administration.

Roche is married to Eleanor Griffin, and they have three sons and one daughter. They live in County Wicklow.

On 15 December 2008, he was held hostage during a robbery at the Druids Glen Marriott Hotel and Country Club in County Wicklow.

== Political career ==
Roche worked as a public servant at the Departments of Posts and Telegraphs, Transport and Power, Finance and at the Department of Economic Planning and Development. In 1978, he was appointed lecturer in Public Administration and Public Finance at UCD. In 1978, Roche became the first Irish citizen to be awarded a United Nations Human Rights fellowship. He subsequently became a member of the Irish Commission for Justice and Peace and served as a time as chairperson of the commission.

Roche began his political career when he was elected for Greystones at the 1985 Wicklow County Council election. Two years later, at the 1987 general election he was elected to Dáil Éireann as a Fianna Fáil TD for Wicklow.

Roche lost his seat at the 1992 general election, but was elected to 20th Seanad. He introduced the Freedom of Information Bill 1995, based closely on the Norwegian freedom of information legislation. He was returned to the 28th Dáil at the 1997 general election and remained a TD until 2011.

Following the 2002 general election Roche was appointed as Minister of State for European Affairs, at the Department of the Taoiseach and the Department of Foreign Affairs. In his role, he played a large role during Ireland's presidency of the European Council in 2004. In 2004, Roche was conferred with the Order of the Cross of Terra Mariana by the Government of Estonia for his support of Estonia's accession to the European Union. In 2004, he was appointed as Minister for the Environment, Heritage and Local Government. He retained his seat at the 2007 general election, but on the formation of the new government, was the only member of the outgoing cabinet to be demoted. His last act as minister was the signing of an order that was to lead to work being resumed on the controversial M3 motorway near the Hill of Tara. He was re-appointed as Minister of State for European Affairs, during which Ireland conducted two referendums on the Treaty of Lisbon.

== 2011 election defeat ==
He lost his seat at the 2011 general election, polling only 5.5% of the first preference vote, down from the 15.8% he polled four years previously. Roche prolonged the count by requesting a recount when it was found that only three votes separated him and his Fianna Fáil running mate Pat Fitzgerald, an action which was criticised by some other candidates including Fitzgerald, who also accepted that there wouldn't be a seat for Fianna Fáil. He was not present at the announcement of his elimination which was greeted by cheering and applause from a number of people at the count centre.

Political offices
New office	Minister of State for European Affairs; 2002–2004	Succeeded by Noel Treacy
Preceded by Martin Cullen	Minister for the Environment, Heritage and Local Government; 2004–2007	Succeeded by John Gormley
Preceded by Noel Treacy	Minister of State for European Affairs; 2007–2011	Succeeded by Lucinda Creighton

Dáil	Election	Deputy (Party)	Deputy (Party)	Deputy (Party)	Deputy (Party)	Deputy (Party)
4th	1923	Christopher Byrne (CnaG)	James Everett (Lab)	Richard Wilson (FP)	3 seats 1923–1981	
5th	1927 (Jun)	Séamus Moore (FF)	James Everett (Lab)	Dermot O'Mahony (CnaG)	3 seats 1923–1981	
6th	1927 (Sep)	Séamus Moore (FF)	James Everett (Lab)	Dermot O'Mahony (CnaG)	3 seats 1923–1981	
7th	1932	Séamus Moore (FF)	James Everett (Lab)	Dermot O'Mahony (CnaG)	3 seats 1923–1981	
8th	1933	Séamus Moore (FF)	James Everett (Lab)	Dermot O'Mahony (CnaG)	3 seats 1923–1981	
9th	1937	Séamus Moore (FF)	James Everett (Lab)	Dermot O'Mahony (FG)	3 seats 1923–1981	
10th	1938	Séamus Moore (FF)	James Everett (Lab)	Patrick Cogan (Ind.)	3 seats 1923–1981	
11th	1943	Christopher Byrne (FF)	James Everett (Lab)	Patrick Cogan (CnaT)	3 seats 1923–1981	
12th	1944	Thomas Brennan (FF)	James Everett (NLP)	Patrick Cogan (CnaT)	3 seats 1923–1981	
13th	1948	Thomas Brennan (FF)	James Everett (NLP)	Patrick Cogan (Ind.)	3 seats 1923–1981	
14th	1951	Thomas Brennan (FF)	James Everett (Lab)	Patrick Cogan (Ind.)	3 seats 1923–1981	
14th	1953 by-election	Mark Deering (FG)	James Everett (Lab)	Patrick Cogan (Ind.)	3 seats 1923–1981	
15th	1954	Mark Deering (FG)	James Everett (Lab)	Paudge Brennan (FF)	3 seats 1923–1981	
16th	1957	James O'Toole (FF)	James Everett (Lab)	Paudge Brennan (FF)	3 seats 1923–1981	
17th	1961	Michael O'Higgins (FG)	James Everett (Lab)	Paudge Brennan (FF)	3 seats 1923–1981	
18th	1965	Michael O'Higgins (FG)	James Everett (Lab)	Paudge Brennan (FF)	3 seats 1923–1981	
18th	1968 by-election	Michael O'Higgins (FG)	Godfrey Timmins (FG)	Paudge Brennan (FF)	3 seats 1923–1981	
19th	1969	Liam Kavanagh (Lab)	Godfrey Timmins (FG)	Paudge Brennan (FF)	3 seats 1923–1981	
20th	1973	Liam Kavanagh (Lab)	Godfrey Timmins (FG)	Ciarán Murphy (FF)	3 seats 1923–1981	
21st	1977	Liam Kavanagh (Lab)	Godfrey Timmins (FG)	Ciarán Murphy (FF)	3 seats 1923–1981	
22nd	1981	Liam Kavanagh (Lab)	Godfrey Timmins (FG)	Ciarán Murphy (FF)	Paudge Brennan (FF)	4 seats 1981–1992
23rd	1982 (Feb)	Liam Kavanagh (Lab)	Godfrey Timmins (FG)	Ciarán Murphy (FF)	Gemma Hussey (FG)	4 seats 1981–1992
24th	1982 (Nov)	Liam Kavanagh (Lab)	Godfrey Timmins (FG)	Paudge Brennan (FF)	Gemma Hussey (FG)	4 seats 1981–1992
25th	1987	Liam Kavanagh (Lab)	Joe Jacob (FF)	Dick Roche (FF)	Gemma Hussey (FG)	4 seats 1981–1992
26th	1989	Liam Kavanagh (Lab)	Joe Jacob (FF)	Dick Roche (FF)	Godfrey Timmins (FG)	4 seats 1981–1992
27th	1992	Liam Kavanagh (Lab)	Joe Jacob (FF)	Liz McManus (DL)	Godfrey Timmins (FG)	Johnny Fox (Ind.)
27th	1995 by-election	Liam Kavanagh (Lab)	Joe Jacob (FF)	Liz McManus (DL)	Godfrey Timmins (FG)	Mildred Fox (Ind.)
28th	1997	Dick Roche (FF)	Joe Jacob (FF)	Liz McManus (DL)	Billy Timmins (FG)	Mildred Fox (Ind.)
29th	2002	Dick Roche (FF)	Joe Jacob (FF)	Liz McManus (Lab)	Billy Timmins (FG)	Mildred Fox (Ind.)
30th	2007	Dick Roche (FF)	Joe Behan (FF)	Liz McManus (Lab)	Billy Timmins (FG)	Andrew Doyle (FG)
31st	2011	Simon Harris (FG)	Stephen Donnelly (Ind.)	Anne Ferris (Lab)	Billy Timmins (FG)	Andrew Doyle (FG)
32nd	2016	Simon Harris (FG)	Stephen Donnelly (SD)	John Brady (SF)	Pat Casey (FF)	Andrew Doyle (FG)
33rd	2020	Simon Harris (FG)	Stephen Donnelly (FF)	John Brady (SF)	Jennifer Whitmore (SD)	Steven Matthews (GP)
34th	2024	Simon Harris (FG)	Edward Timmins (FG)	John Brady (SF)	Jennifer Whitmore (SD)	4 seats since 2024
