= Wicklow County Council =

Local authority of County Wicklow, Ireland

Wicklow County Council Comhairle Chontae Chill Mhantáin
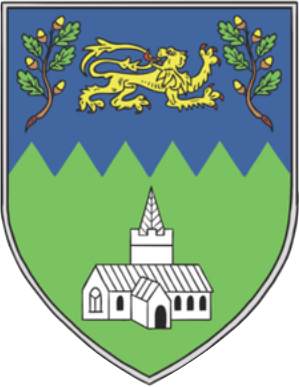

Type
- Type: County council of County Wicklow

History
- Founded: 1 April 1899

Leadership
- Cathaoirleach: Caroline Winstanley, SD

Structure
- Seats: 32
- Political groups: Fine Gael (9) Fianna Fáil (4) Social Democrats (3) Green (2) Sinn Féin (2) Labour (1) Independent Ireland (1) Independent (10)

Elections
- Last election: 7 June 2024

Motto
- Irish: Meanma Saor "Free Spirits"

Meeting place
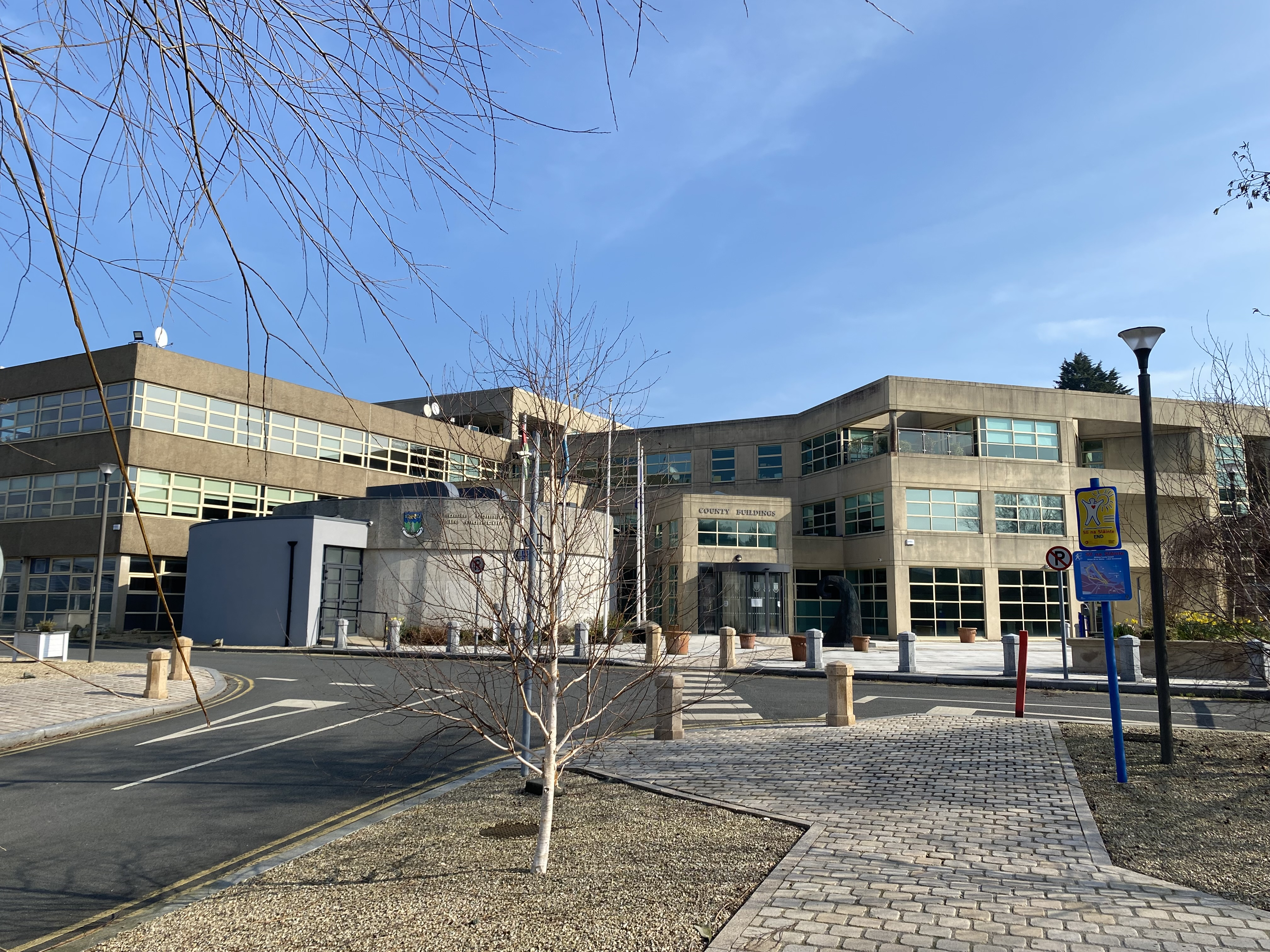
- County Buildings, Wicklow

Website
- Official website

The area governed by the council

Wicklow County Council (Irish: Comhairle Chontae Chill Mhantáin) is the local authority of County Wicklow, Ireland. As a county council, it is governed by the Local Government Act 2001. The council is responsible for housing and community, roads and transportation, urban planning and development, amenity and culture, and environment. The council has 32 elected members. Elections are held every five years and are by single transferable vote. The head of the council has the title of Cathaoirleach (chairperson). The county administration is headed by chief executive, Emer O'Gorman. The county town is Wicklow.

== History ==
Wicklow County Council was established on 1 April 1899 under the Local Government (Ireland) Act 1898 for the administrative county of County Wicklow. It succeeded the judicial county of Wicklow, with the addition of the part of the town of Bray which was formerly in County Dublin.

Originally Wicklow County Council held its meetings in Wicklow Courthouse. The county council moved to a new facility, known as County Buildings, in 1977.

== Regional Assembly ==
Wicklow County Council has three representatives on the Eastern and Midland Regional Assembly who are part of the Eastern Strategic Planning Area Committee.

== Elections ==
The Local Government (Ireland) Act 1919 introduced the electoral system of proportional representation by means of the single transferable vote (PR-STV) for the 1920 Irish local elections. County Wicklow was divided into 4 county electoral areas to elect the 20 members of the council. This electoral system has been retained, with 34 members of Wicklow County Council now elected for a five-year term of office from 6 multi-member local electoral areas (LEAs).

Year	FG	FF	SF	GP	Lab	SD	II	WP	Ind.	Total
2024	9	4	2	2	1	3	1	0	10	32
2019	9	7	2	2	2	1	—N/a	0	9	32
2014	8	7	6	1	0	—N/a	—N/a	0	10	32
2009	9	4	2	0	6	—N/a	—N/a	0	3	24
2004	7	6	0	1	6	—N/a	—N/a	0	4	24
1999	6	8	0	1	5	—N/a	—N/a	0	4	24
1991	4	9	0	1	5	—N/a	—N/a	1	4	24
1985	5	13	0	0	4	—N/a	—N/a	1	1	24
1979	8	7	0	—N/a	4	—N/a	—N/a	1	1	21

== Local electoral areas and municipal districts ==
County Wicklow is divided into local electoral areas, defined by electoral divisions, for elections to the council, and into municipal districts which exercise powers of the council locally.

Municipal District	LEA	Definition	Seats
Arklow		Arklow No. 1 Urban, Arklow No. 2 Urban, Arklow Rural, Aughrim, Avoca, Ballinaclash, Ballinacor, Ballinderry, Ballyarthur, Cronebane, Dunganstown South, Dunganstown West, Ennereilly, Kilballyowen, Kilbride (in the former Rural District of Rathdrum), Kilpipe, Knockrath, and Rathdrum	6
Baltinglass		Aghowle, Ballingate, Ballinglen, Ballinguile, Ballybeg, Baltinglass, Blessington, Burgage, Carnew, Coolattin, Coolballintaggart, Coolboy, Cronelea, Donaghmore, Donard, Dunlavin, Eadestown, Hartstown, Hollywood, Humewood, Imael North, Imael South, Kilbride (in the former Rural District of Baltinglass No.1), Killinure, Lackan, Lugglass, Money, Rath, Rathdangan, Rathsallagh, Shillelagh, Stratford, Talbotstown, The Grange, Tinahely, Tober, Togher (in the former Rural District of Baltinglass No.1) and Tuckmill	6
Bray	Bray East	Bray No. 1 Urban, Bray No. 2 Urban, Bray No. 3 Urban and Rathmichael (Bray)	4
Bray	Bray West	Enniskerry, Kilmacanoge and Powerscourt	4
Greystones		Delgany, Greystones, Kilcoole and Newcastle Lower	6
Wicklow		Altidore, Ballycullen, Brockagh, Calary, Dunganstown East, Glendalough, Glenealy, Killiskey, Moneystown, Newcastle Upper, Oldtown, Togher (in the former Rural District of Rathdrum), Trooperstown, Wicklow Rural and Wicklow Urban	6

== Councillors ==
The following were elected at the 2024 Wicklow County Council election.

=== 2024 seats summary ===
Party	Seats
Fine Gael	9
Fianna Fáil	4
Social Democrats	3
Green	2
Sinn Féin	2
Independent Ireland	1
Labour	1
Independent	10

=== Councillors by electoral area ===
This list reflects the order in which councillors were elected on 7 June 2024.

Council members from 2024 election
LEA	Name	Party
Arklow	Pat Kennedy	Fianna Fáil
Arklow	Peir Leonard	Independent
Arklow	Sylvester Bourke	Fine Gael
Arklow	Pat Fitzgerald	Fianna Fáil
Arklow	Miriam Murphy	Independent
Arklow	Warren O'Toole	Sinn Féin
Baltinglass	Gerry O'Neill	Independent
Baltinglass	Edward Timmins (Note: Replaced during term, see table below for details.)	Fine Gael
Baltinglass	Peter Stapleton	Fine Gael
Baltinglass	Avril Cronin	Fine Gael
Baltinglass	Patsy Glennon	Fianna Fáil
Baltinglass	Jason Mulhall	Independent
Bray East	Aoife Flynn Kennedy	Fine Gael
Bray East	Erika Doyle	Green
Bray East	Ian Neary	Independent Ireland
Bray East	Malachaí Duddy	Independent
Bray West	Joe Behan	Independent
Bray West	Melanie Corrigan	Fine Gael
Bray West	Dermot O'Brien	Sinn Féin
Bray West	Caroline Winstanley	Social Democrats
Greystones	Stephen Stokes	Independent
Greystones	Tom Fortune	Independent
Greystones	Louise Fenelon Gaskin	Fine Gael
Greystones	Orla Finn	Independent
Greystones	Mark Barry	Social Democrats
Greystones	Lourda Scott	Green
Wicklow	John Snell	Independent
Wicklow	Danny Alvey	Social Democrats
Wicklow	Gail Dunne	Fianna Fáil
Wicklow	Shane Langrell	Fine Gael
Wicklow	Paul O'Brien	Labour
Wicklow	Graham Richmond	Fine Gael

==== Co-options ====
Party	Outgoing	LEA	Reason	Date	Co-optee
Fine Gael	Edward Timmins	Baltinglass	Elected to 34th Dáil for Wicklow at the 2024 general election	18 December 2024	Pat Mahon
Fine Gael	Aoife Flynn Kennedy	Bray East	Resignation	March 2025	Ned Whelan
Sinn Féin	Dermot O'Brien	Bray West	Resignation	6 May 2026	John Ward
