= 2025 Irish presidential election =

- 24 October 2025
- Opinion polls
- Registered: 3,614,450
- Turnout: 45.8% (▲1.9 pp)
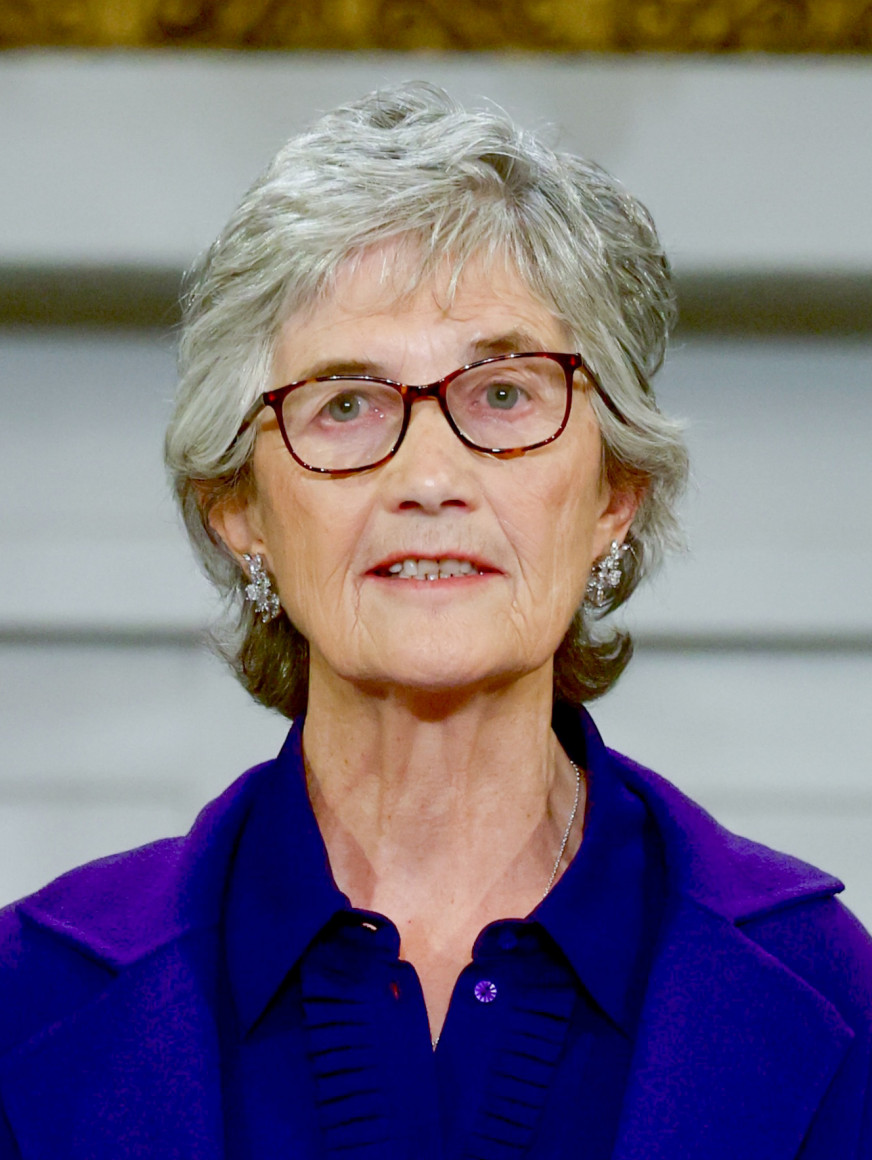

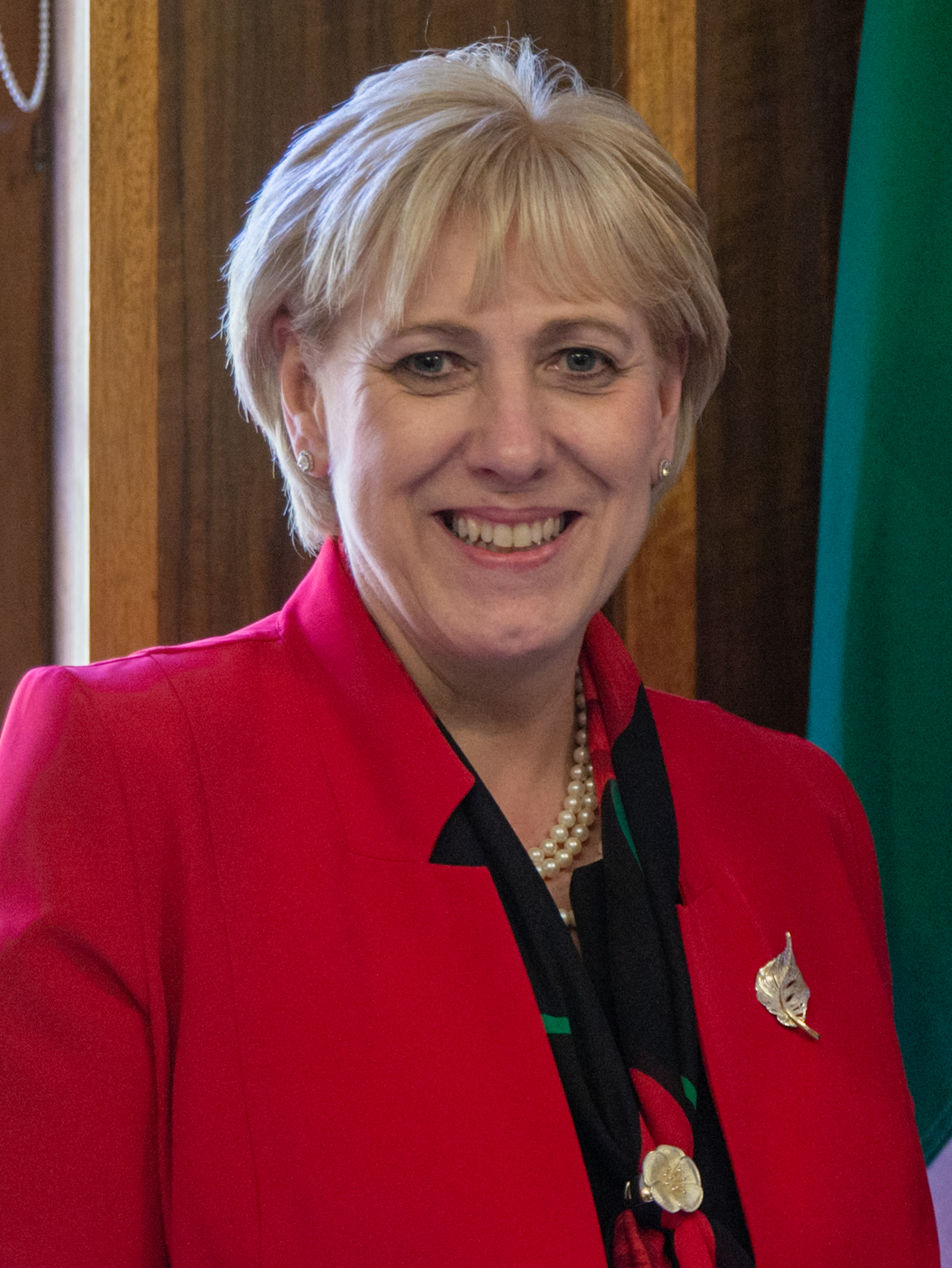

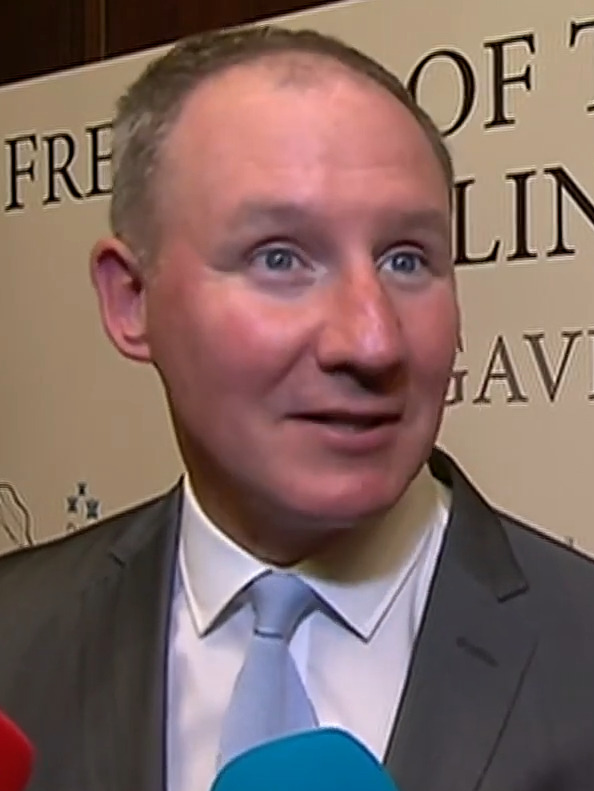
Nominee	Catherine Connolly	Heather Humphreys	Jim Gavin (Note: Withdrew after nominations were finalised, remained on ballot)
Party	Independent	Fine Gael	Fianna Fáil
Alliance	Nominators: Sinn Féin; Labour; Social Democrats; PBP–Solidarity; Green Party; 100% Redress; Independents (Note: Catherine Connolly TD, Séamus Healy TD, Brian Stanley TD, Senator Eileen Flynn.)
1st preference	914,143 (63.36%)	424,987 (29.46%)	103,568 (7.18%)
- Result by Dáil constituency
President before election
Michael D. Higgins
Independent
Elected President
Catherine Connolly
Independent

A presidential election was held in Ireland on Friday, 24 October 2025. The incumbent president, Michael D. Higgins, was term-limited, having served the maximum two seven-year terms permitted under the Constitution of Ireland. The nominated candidates were Catherine Connolly (independent), Jim Gavin (Fianna Fáil), and Heather Humphreys (Fine Gael). All three were nominated by members of the Oireachtas rather than by county or city councils. The 1990 Irish presidential election had been the last to feature only three candidates, and also the last to feature no candidates nominated by councils. Due to a perceived lack of choice the Spoil The Vote campaign was launched encouraging voters to spoil their vote in protest.

Amid controversy over an unpaid debt to a former tenant, Gavin discontinued his campaign on 5 October. However, his name remained on the ballot, as a candidate can formally withdraw only before the ruling on nominations, which had taken place on 24 September. There had not been a two-candidate election since the 1973 Irish presidential election. Opinion polls carried out before the election predicted a significant advantage for Connolly.

Voting took place from 7 a.m. to 10 p.m. on 24 October. Following the release of preliminary tallies on 25 October indicating a landslide victory for Connolly, Humphreys conceded the election. The official result was announced at Dublin Castle shortly before 7:30 p.m. The final turnout was 45.8%. Of the valid votes cast, Connolly received 63.4%, the highest percentage ever by first preference votes received in a contested Irish presidential election. With 914,143 votes, she also recorded the highest number of first-preference votes ever received by an electoral candidate in Ireland. Humphreys received 29.5% of the valid votes and Gavin 7.2%. There were 213,738 spoiled votes, or 12.9% of the total votes cast, record numbers in Irish electoral history.

Connolly was elected and was inaugurated as Ireland's tenth president on 11 November 2025 at Dublin Castle, becoming the country's third female president, after Mary Robinson and Mary McAleese.

== Procedure ==
Presidential elections are conducted in line with Article 12 of the Constitution and under the Presidential Elections Act 1993. The president is elected through instant-runoff voting (described in the constitution as the single transferable vote). All Irish citizens entered on the current electoral register are eligible to vote. The 2025 election was the first presidential election since the 2023 establishment of the Electoral Commission.

=== Dates ===
The Constitution requires the election to be not more than 60 days before the end of the term of the incumbent president, which for Michael D. Higgins is 11 November. On 3 September, James Browne, the minister for housing, local government and heritage, signed a ministerial order fixing the date of the election as 24 October 2025. The nomination period began at 10 a.m. on 5 September and concluded at 12 p.m. on 24 September 2025. The ruling on nominations took place at 3 p.m. on 24 September 2025. This was the last date upon which a candidate could withdraw from the election. The final day for voter registration was 7 October 2025.

=== Nominations ===
To stand for election as president of Ireland, candidates must:

- be a citizen of Ireland
- be at least 35 years of age
- be nominated by:
  - at least 20 of the 234 serving members of the Houses of the Oireachtas, or
  - at least 4 of the 31 county or city councils, or
  - themselves, in the case of a former or incumbent president who has served at most one 7-year term (only Mary Robinson at the time of the election).

A county or city council or member of the Oireachtas can only nominate one candidate; if they submit a nomination paper for an additional candidate, only the first nomination paper received is deemed to be valid. Under the Electoral (Amendment) Act 2011, there is a spending limit by each candidate of €750,000. Candidates who are elected or who reach 12.5% of the vote on their elimination are entitled to a reimbursement of expenses up to €200,000.

== Candidates ==
The following candidates received sufficient nominations to stand as candidates. All three were nominated by Oireachtas members, rather than by councils.

Party	Presidential candidate	Campaign	Nominated by	Sources
Independent	Catherine Connolly: TD for Galway West (since 2016); Leas-Cheann Comhairle (2020–2024)	(campaign) www.catherineconnollyforpresident.ie	79 Oireachtas members: Sinn Féin (45 Oireachtas members); Labour (12 Oireachtas members) (Note: Alan Kelly, a Labour TD, chose not to nominate Connolly.); Social Democrats (12 Oireachtas members); People Before Profit (2 Oireachtas members); Green Party (2 Oireachtas members); Solidarity (1 Oireachtas member); 100% Redress (1 Oireachtas member); 4 independent Oireachtas members	
Fine Gael	Heather Humphreys: Deputy leader of Fine Gael (2024); Government minister (2014–2025); TD for Cavan–Monaghan (2011–2024)	(campaign) www.heatherforpresident.ie	Fine Gael (55 Oireachtas members)	
Fianna Fáil	Jim Gavin: Dublin Gaelic football manager (2012–2019) Officer in the Irish Air Corps (1990–2011); Campaign suspended on 5 October	(campaign) jimgavinforpresident.ie	Fianna Fáil (67 Oireachtas members)	

== Candidate selection ==
Following the 2024 Irish general election, as well as the 2025 Seanad election, only three political parties had the 20 members of the Oireachtas required to nominate a candidate: Fianna Fáil (48 TDs and 19 senators), Fine Gael (38 TDs and 17 senators) and Sinn Féin (39 TDs and 6 senators). Labour, the next largest party in the Oireachtas, had 11 TDs and 2 senators. For other candidates to be nominated by Oireachtas members, support would have been required from members of smaller parties, independents (of which there were then 15 TDs and 13 senators) or excess members of the three larger parties. When Met Éireann proposed storm names for the 2025–26 European windstorm season, it excluded names of those being discussed as potential candidates.

=== Fianna Fáil ===
2025 Fianna Fáil nomination for presidential election
- 9 September 2025
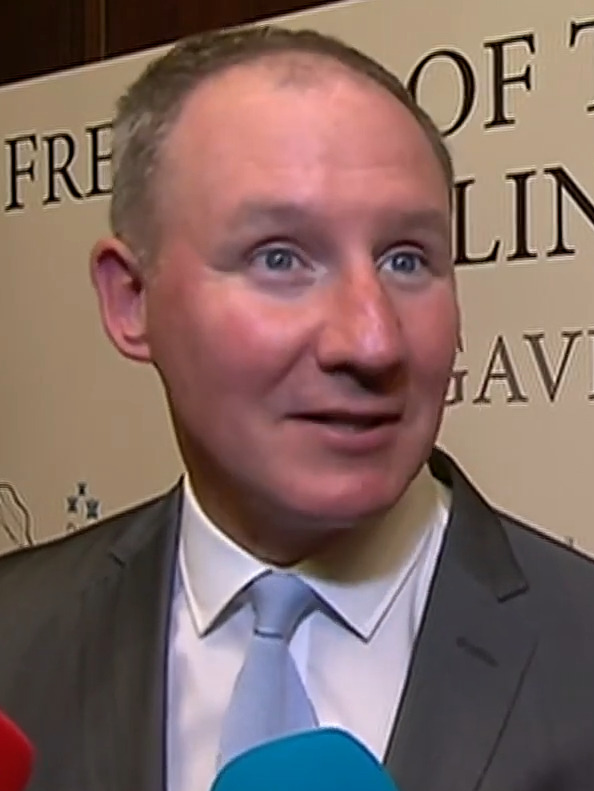

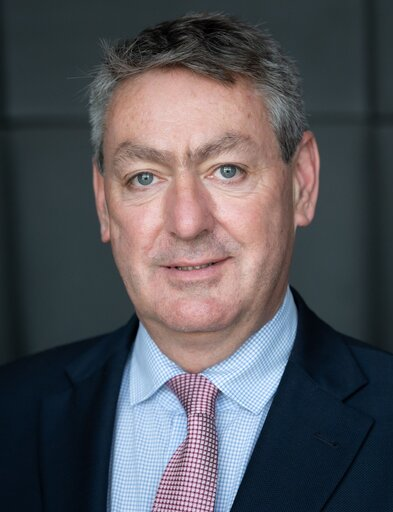
Candidate	Jim Gavin	Billy Kelleher
Percentage	59%	41%
Vote	41 / 70	29 / 70

Except for Mary Robinson, every President of Ireland from 1938 to 2011 had been elected with the support of Fianna Fáil. Following the financial crisis and a heavy defeat at the 2011 general election, the party opted not to contest the 2011 presidential election in order to focus on rebuilding. In 2018, Fianna Fáil endorsed incumbent president Michael D. Higgins for re-election.

Despite becoming the largest party in Dáil Éireann at the 2024 general election, Fianna Fáil lacked an obvious front-runner for the presidency in 2025, and in late June The Irish Times reported that there was no one longlisted for the party's nomination. In early July, Micheál Martin, Taoiseach and party leader, said that the party would only run a candidate who "would command a very broad consensus or would have a realistic opportunity of getting a significant vote". He expressed a preference for an individual who would transcend party politics and "represent the country well abroad and lead with some sort of moral authority." Party strategists believed Fianna Fáil's chances of victory would be better served by waiting until September to announce a candidate. Nevertheless, over the Dáil summer recess, speculation over the identity of Fianna Fáil's candidate was heated, owing to what the Irish Independent called a "presidency-shaped vacuum" of information, and pressure from a group of TDs for the party to run a political figure from its own ranks.

Former taoiseach Bertie Ahern had been the subject of presidential speculation for several years. After resigning from Fianna Fáil in the wake of the Mahon Tribunal findings in 2012, he rejoined the party in 2023, a move which was seen by political commentators as a possible precursor to a presidential bid. When asked by Virgin Media News in August, a majority of the party's TDs said they supported nominating him for the presidency. The political reporter Gavan Reilly told Newstalk that Ahern was likely to appeal to an older segment of voters but carried considerable baggage from the economic crisis and the Mahon Tribunal. Though he never formally declared his candidacy, Ahern continued to express an interest in standing throughout July and August.

Mary Hanafin, a former minister and party deputy leader, declared that she wished to stand for the presidency, but said that it was up to Micheál Martin to decide how the party would proceed. At an event at the MacGill Summer School in July, she said it would be an "insult to the office of president" if the party did not contest the election. Other Fianna Fáil figures who were the subject of speculation included Micheál Martin himself, MEPs Barry Andrews and Cynthia Ní Mhurchú, and former ministers and junior ministers Pat "the Cope" Gallagher, Máire Geoghegan-Quinn, Éamon Ó Cuív and Peter Power.

Outside of the party, there was speculation about wide range of figures from the law, academia, sport and elsewhere. These included Packie Bonner, Geraldine Byrne Nason, Colum Eastwood, Deirdre Heenan, Daniel Mulhall, Pádraig Ó Céidigh, Síofra O'Leary, Louise Richardson, and Niall Quinn. On 25 August, the Irish Independent reported that senior figures in Fianna Fáil had privately approached Jim Gavin, the former manager of the Dublin men's Gaelic football team and COO of the Irish Aviation Authority, to be the party's presidential candidate. Gavin, one of the most decorated managers in the history of Gaelic football, had served as an officer in the Irish Defence Forces on peacekeeping duty and chaired the Citizens' Assembly on a potential mayor of Dublin in 2022. He did not respond to a request for comment.

On the morning of 29 August, Billy Kelleher, MEP for South and former TD, announced in an email to the Fianna Fáil parliamentary party that he would stand for the presidency. He emphasised his three decades of experience in politics and said that a number of his colleagues had asked him to stand. The Irish Times reported that Kelleher's candidacy would pose a challenge to others, as he enjoyed popularity at all levels of Fianna Fáil. Later that day, Fianna Fáil deputy leader Jack Chambers confirmed that Jim Gavin would also be a candidate, and both Chambers and minister James Lawless endorsed him. The following day, Micheál Martin also endorsed Gavin. He expressed surprise at Kelleher's decision to stand, and disputed the claim that Kelleher enjoyed the support of thirty members of the parliamentary party. Gavin formally announced his candidacy the same day, writing in a letter to the parliamentary party: "I believe that, in these turbulent times, Ireland needs a president who can bring people together and promote and represent our shared values and interests at home and abroad."

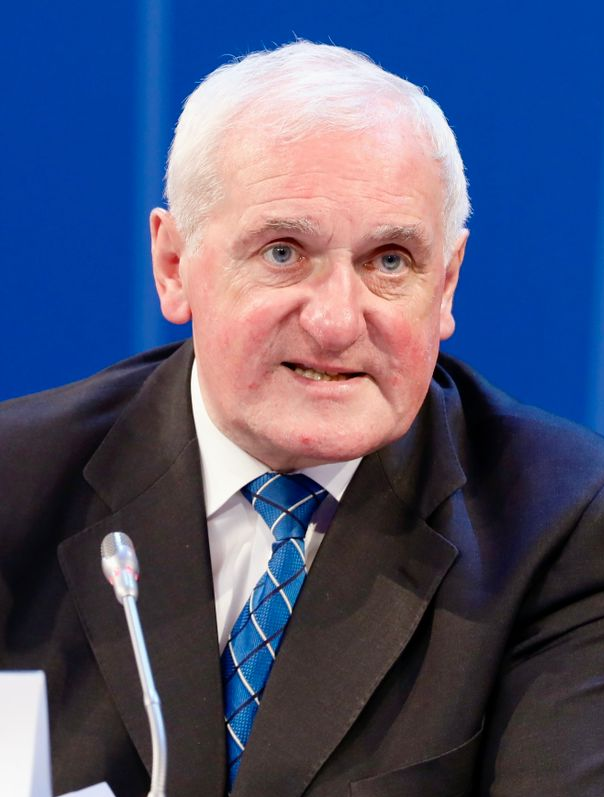
Former Taoiseach Bertie Ahern (pictured sitting in 2024) expressed interest in standing.

In the Irish Examiner, journalist Mick Clifford compared Micheál Martin's support for Gavin over Bertie Ahern to the selection of Mary McAleese as Fianna Fáil presidential candidate over Albert Reynolds in the 1997 election, while Ahern was party leader. Five days after Martin's announcement, Ahern confirmed that he would not be a candidate, claiming that he could not stand without the support of the Fianna Fáil leadership, and that Martin was "anti-me" due to "the economy and the Mahon Tribunal". In a 35-minute voice message to supporters, he claimed that Martin "threw the rest of us [candidates] out" in favour of Jim Gavin. He also said that false claims had been made about his economic legacy, and that these had been "intensified" by a younger generation. This was seen by the Irish Independent as a reference to the musician CMAT, who had recently released a song attacking Ahern. Mary Hanafin also ruled herself out of the election following Martin's endorsement of Gavin, and criticised the leadership's lack of communication with her. The musician and humanitarian Bob Geldof briefly expressed an interest in being Fianna Fáil's candidate, but Martin said that he was committed to Gavin and would not be altering his support.

Nominations for the contest closed on 5 September, with Kelleher and Gavin as the only candidates. Gavin had significantly more public endorsements than Kelleher, who was not supported by a single cabinet minister. Kelleher criticised the decision of senior Fianna Fáil figures to endorse "early on", and disagreed with the claim that he was running to damage Micheál Martin's leadership. Through early September, there was intense lobbying of the parliamentary party by both campaigns. Kelleher supporter Pádraig O'Sullivan said that he believed the MEP had a route to win the nomination, despite Gavin's front-runner status.

On 9 September at Leinster House, a meeting was held of the party's TDs, senators and MEPs to select the candidate. Following ten-minute speeches by Gavin and Kelleher, there was a secret ballot, which Gavin won by 41 votes to 29. (Note: The Fianna Fáil parliamentary party comprises 71 members. Mark Daly, Cathaoirleach of Seanad Éireann, was not eligible to vote.) Kelleher endorsed Gavin following the result. After being nominated, Gavin, who had not previously expressed political views, said that he was a "centrist and a constitutional Republican", that he had supported same-sex marriage and the repeal of the Eighth Amendment, and that he favoured removal of the Triple Lock. Media outlets suggested that Kelleher's unexpectedly strong showing might be a blow to Micheál Martin's leadership, but Martin disputed this, saying that a referendum on his leadership had already taken place at the last general election. RTÉ News suggested that Gavin's strongest characteristics were his "near untouchable" status in the GAA, his work ethic and his leadership skills, but that a reputation for seriousness and restraint, as well as a lack of appeal in rural Ireland, might hurt his campaign.

On 5 October 2025, Gavin announced that he was withdrawing from the election; this followed a presidential debate on RTÉ in which he was questioned on his failure to repay €3,300 owed by him for several years to a former tenant (later revealed to be Niall Donald, now deputy editor of the Sunday World). Gavin's name remained on the ballot, as a candidate may only withdraw before the ruling on nominations, which took place on 24 September.

=== Fine Gael ===
Prior to 2025, Fine Gael had nominated a candidate in every contested presidential election except 2018, but had never won the office. Its most recent candidate, Gay Mitchell, finished fourth in the 2011 election with 6.4% of the first-preference vote, the party's worst ever presidential showing. In March, Simon Harris, Tánaiste and party leader, confirmed that Fine Gael would nominate a candidate in 2025, to be chosen through a selection convention. Candidates required the nomination of 20 members of the parliamentary party (comprising TDs, Senators and MEPs), 25 county or city councillors, and five members of the party's executive council. Nominations for selection as the party candidate opened on 7 July. A number of high-profile Fine Gael politicians declined to stand for the presidential nomination, including former Taoisigh Enda Kenny and Leo Varadkar, former Tánaiste Frances Fitzgerald, the party's former deputy leader Heather Humphreys, and veteran MEP and former GAA president Seán Kelly.

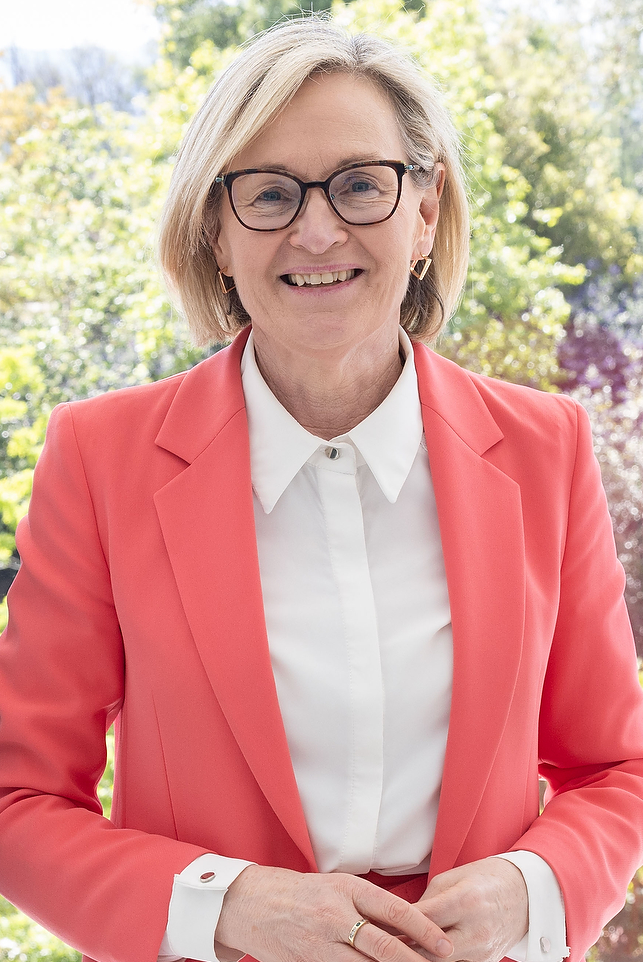
Mairead McGuinness (pictured in 2024) won Fine Gael's nomination in July, but withdrew from the election a month later.

The nomination period closed on 15 July. Mairead McGuinness, former European commissioner and first vice-president of the European Parliament, was the only candidate nominated. McGuinness, who worked as a journalist and broadcaster for RTÉ before entering politics, had been an unsuccessful candidate for the Fine Gael presidential nomination in 2011. However, she dropped out of the election on 14 August following medical advice, saying in a statement: "I do not believe that I have the strength to give the campaign my all." McGuinness' withdrawal was widely regarded as a shock, as she had been considered favourite to win the election.

Following the withdrawal of McGuinness, Fine Gael reopened the nomination process on 18 August 2025. Heather Humphreys and Seán Kelly confirmed that they would seek the nomination. Humphreys said in an interview with Northern Sound that she had felt burnt out when she decided to step down at the 2024 general election, but now had "never felt as ready for a challenge", and wished to represent "a modern and an outward looking Ireland with pride on the international stage". Kelly told Morning Ireland that he was "delighted and enthusiastic" to be running, having very reluctantly decided not to stand against Mairead McGuinness.

Kelly was unable to secure enough support from the Fine Gael parliamentary party to contest the selection convention and withdrew on 1 September. The following day, the party confirmed Heather Humphreys as its candidate. The Irish Times reported that Humphreys' campaign was likely to focus on her ministerial experience as well as her links to rural Ireland and the Border Region, but that her opponents would seek to draw attention to government failures in health and housing as well as controversies during her time in the arts and justice portfolios.

=== Catherine Connolly ===
The outgoing president, Michael D. Higgins, had originally been nominated for the presidency by the Labour Party in the 2011 election. Because Labour and all other left-wing parties besides Sinn Féin did not have enough Oireachtas members to nominate a candidate on their own in 2025, there were proposals for a joint candidate who would continue Higgins' legacy. Labour leader Ivana Bacik wrote to the leaders of the Social Democrats and the Green Party in February proposing a united front, saying: "If we want to see the election of a new president who shares the values articulated so ably on behalf of the nation by Michael D Higgins, then I believe that we should now explore the possibility, along with other parties that share our vision and values, of taking a combined approach to selecting an appropriate candidate for the office." The Social Democrats and Greens expressed openness to the idea.

In March, Frances Black, singer and independent senator, who had been a leading advocate of the Occupied Territories Bill, said that she had been "asked by a couple of the parties" and was open to discussing the possibility of a presidential bid. In an appearance on The Late Late Show later that month, she said that no decision had been made. Other individuals who were the subject of speculation were Ivana Bacik, Noeline Blackwell (former CEO of Dublin Rape Crisis Centre), Holly Cairns, Fergus Finlay, Claire Hanna, Aodhán Ó Ríordáin, Fintan O'Toole, Eamon Ryan, and Róisín Shortall.

By the beginning of June, the focus had narrowed to Frances Black and independent Galway West TD Catherine Connolly. TheJournal.ie reported that there was "good enthusiasm" in most parties for Connolly, a former Leas-Cheann Comhairle, who was seen as a "credible candidate who could hold her own in debates", but that some in the Labour Party were opposed to her and to the idea of a joint ticket involving Sinn Féin. Mike Ryan and Joe Duffy had been proposed as alternative candidates. In late June, Black confirmed that she would not stand for the presidency, because she wished to focus on the Occupied Territories Bill and to avoid the potential "bloodbath" of a presidential campaign. Speaking to The Irish Times, People Before Profit TD Paul Murphy said his party were "very enthusiastic" about the prospect of a united left candidate in the mould of President Higgins, but that the viability of a bid depended on whether Sinn Féin were involved, and expressed hope that they would make a decision soon.

On 11 July, Catherine Connolly confirmed she was running for president and that she would launch her campaign the following week. Later that day, the Social Democrats released a statement declaring their support for Connolly; Jennifer Whitmore said she was the overwhelming choice of party members. People Before Profit, 100% Redress and a number of independents also supported Connolly. After launching her campaign on Raidió na Gaeltachta on 16 July, Connolly told reporters at Leinster House that she had the twenty signatures required to be formally nominated. She said she had entered the race reluctantly: "I was questioning myself. 'Who am I?' 'Would I be able to do this job?', and other questions like that." She intended to centre her campaign on climate change, housing and the pursuit of peace.

At the end of July, following consultation with its membership, the Labour Party decided to support Connolly as "the left candidate for the presidency". Connolly had been a Labour councillor in Galway, but resigned from the party in 2006 over a selection dispute with then-TD Michael D. Higgins and had been highly critical of the party in subsequent years. Several weeks later, Alan Kelly, a former minister and Labour leader, said that although Connolly had received Labour's backing, he would not nominate or vote for her. He told Tipp FM: "I think the party has to have some self-respect. Catherine Connolly has shown disdain for us since 2006." He also criticised Connolly's stances on the Syrian civil war and the Russo-Ukrainian War, and her decision to nominate Gemma O'Doherty for the presidency in 2018.

Sinn Féin's possible involvement in a broad left ticket led by Connolly was the subject of considerable speculation, as the party had enough Oireachtas members to nominate a candidate in its own right. In July, party president Mary Lou McDonald said "all options are on the table", including support for Connolly, and that a process was underway which would conclude in a few weeks. Gerry Adams, Rose Conway-Walsh, Pearse Doherty, John Finucane and Michelle O'Neill were considered possible Sinn Féin candidates, as was GAA president Jarlath Burns, who was not a member of the party.

There was particularly intense speculation regarding the possibility of McDonald herself running. Having ruled out a bid in March, she stated in July that it was possible that she would be a candidate. In August, McDonald told The Irish Times that she had "obviously been thinking about things on a personal level but more importantly I've been leading and involved in, and listening to the party conversation". A Sunday Independent poll in early September showed McDonald polling considerably better than any other prospective Sinn Féin candidate, and marginally ahead of Catherine Connolly in a four-way race. On 8 September, McDonald finally ruled herself out of the running. Speaking on Morning Ireland, she said that she needed to "lead from the front" while in opposition. She reiterated that the party had not decided on its approach to the election and would be meeting Catherine Connolly's team in the coming days. The following week, at the National Ploughing Championships, McDonald told reporters that Sinn Féin had decided on a candidate who spoke "a lot of Irish" – a reference to the lack of fluency of the Fianna Fáil and Fine Gael nominees – and that the announcement would be a "game changer".

Two days later, following a meeting of the party's Ard Comhairle, Sinn Féin announced its support for Catherine Connolly. The party said she would "champion a united Ireland, stand up for Ireland's place in the world as a defender of neutrality and human rights, and speak out for fairness and economic justice" and that they would offer financial backing to her campaign. They also expressed a desire to offer a united opposition to the government parties and said that Connolly represented the same values as President Higgins. The previous month, Connolly had visited Belfast and expressed support for a united Ireland, moves widely seen as crucial in winning the support of Sinn Féin. Connolly also received the support of Solidarity and the Green Party in September.

Connolly's official campaign launch in Dublin on 22 September featured speeches from Sinn Féin, Labour, the Social Democrats, People Before Profit, the Green Party and the independent senator Eileen Flynn. The Irish Times suggested that Connolly's success in uniting the left would probably make her front-runner to win the election and was potentially a precursor to a left-wing coalition at the next general election, but that Sinn Féin's decision to nominate her looked like a "Plan C".

=== Others ===
A number of independent political and civil society figures were considered possible candidates for the presidency, including Tom Clonan, Joe Duffy, Luke 'Ming' Flanagan, Seán Gallagher, Declan Ganley, Sharon Keogan, Aubrey McCarthy, Michael McDowell, Olivia O'Leary and Mick Wallace. Peter Casey, runner-up in the 2018 election, was the first independent to announce his candidacy when he declared in March, but he did not win a nomination.

Conor McGregor, a mixed martial artist, began discussing the possibility of running for the presidency in 2023. As to why he would stand, McGregor said: "Among many other things, the allocation of our nation's funds has been nothing short of criminal, and without an iota of consideration for the public's thinking." A poll that month found that eight per cent of people would vote for McGregor if he ran for public office, while 89 per cent said they would not. In 2025, McGregor visited the White House at the invitation of U.S. president Donald Trump for a Saint Patrick's Day event. Announcing his intention to stand as an independent, he claimed that Ireland was "on the cusp of losing its Irishness" due to an "illegal immigration racket", comments which were widely condemned in Ireland.

Although McGregor's candidacy made international headlines, domestic news sources noted it was extremely unlikely that McGregor would gain access to the ballot; surveys by The Irish Times and Sky News indicated he did not have support among either councillors or Oireachtas members to be nominated. In late August, The Irish Times reported that McGregor had not made any effort to contact a county council about securing a nomination and suggested that McGregor was merely "cosplaying" as a presidential candidate online. McGregor then contacted a number of councils. Two weeks later, on the day he was to meet councils in Dublin city and Kildare, McGregor announced that he was no longer seeking a nomination for the presidency, stating that he believed the eligibility rules in Ireland's "outdated Constitution" were a "straitjacket" that prevented a "true democratic presidential election being contested".

Former Riverdance performer Michael Flatley announced in July that he would seek to gain the required nominations to enter the race. He withdrew from the election six weeks later, citing health and family concerns. In August, former chief medical officer Tony Holohan openly considered running and enjoyed favourable polling, but ultimately decided against due to fears of "personal abuse". In early September, meteorologist and former RTÉ weather presenter Joanna Donnelly announced she had contacted every local authority to obtain council nominations. However, within three days, she withdrew her candidacy following interviews with the media and conversations with politicians, saying that she was not prepared for a campaign.

==== Council nominations ====
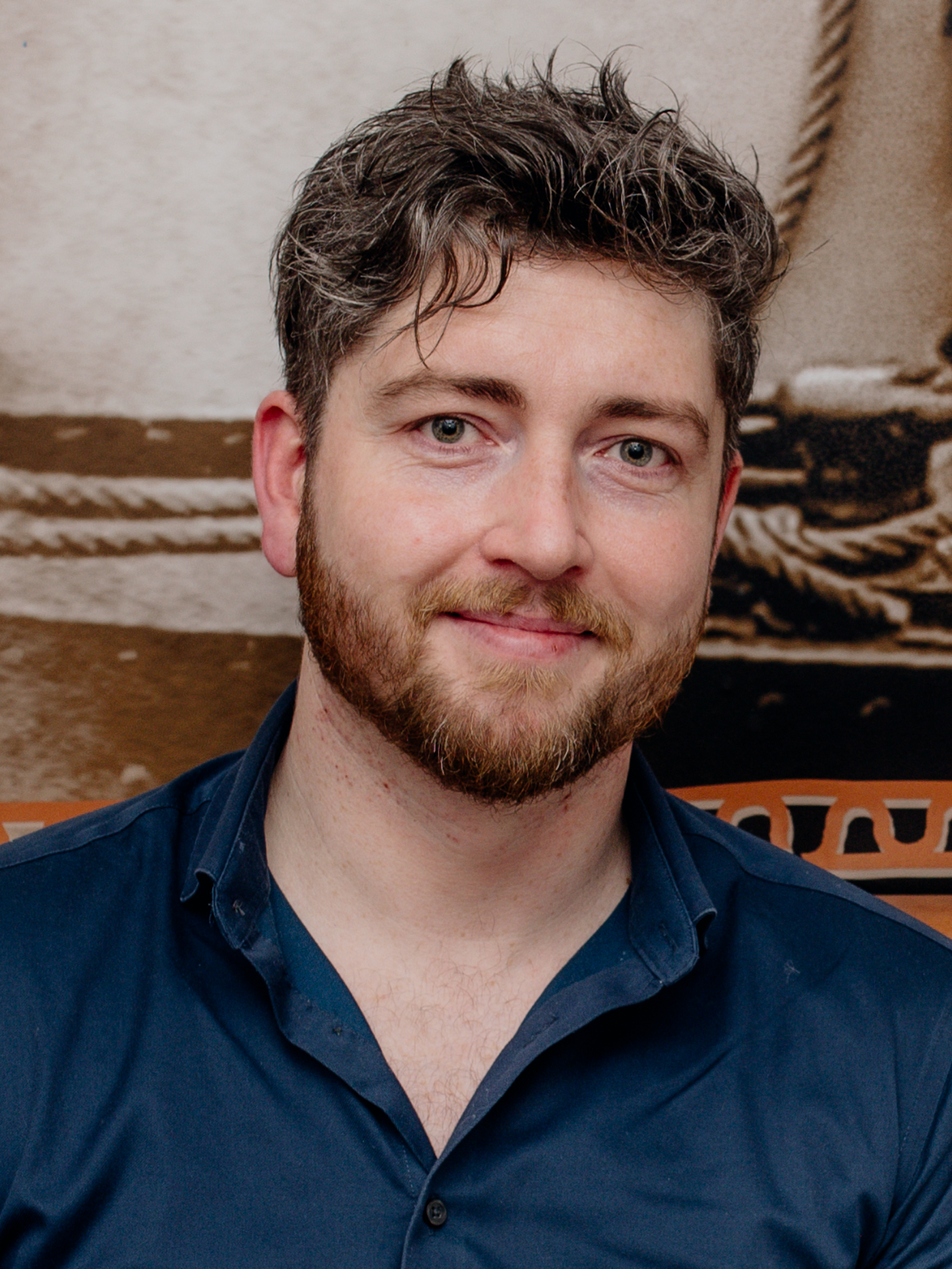
Gareth Sheridan managed to secure the backing of two councils during the nomination process...

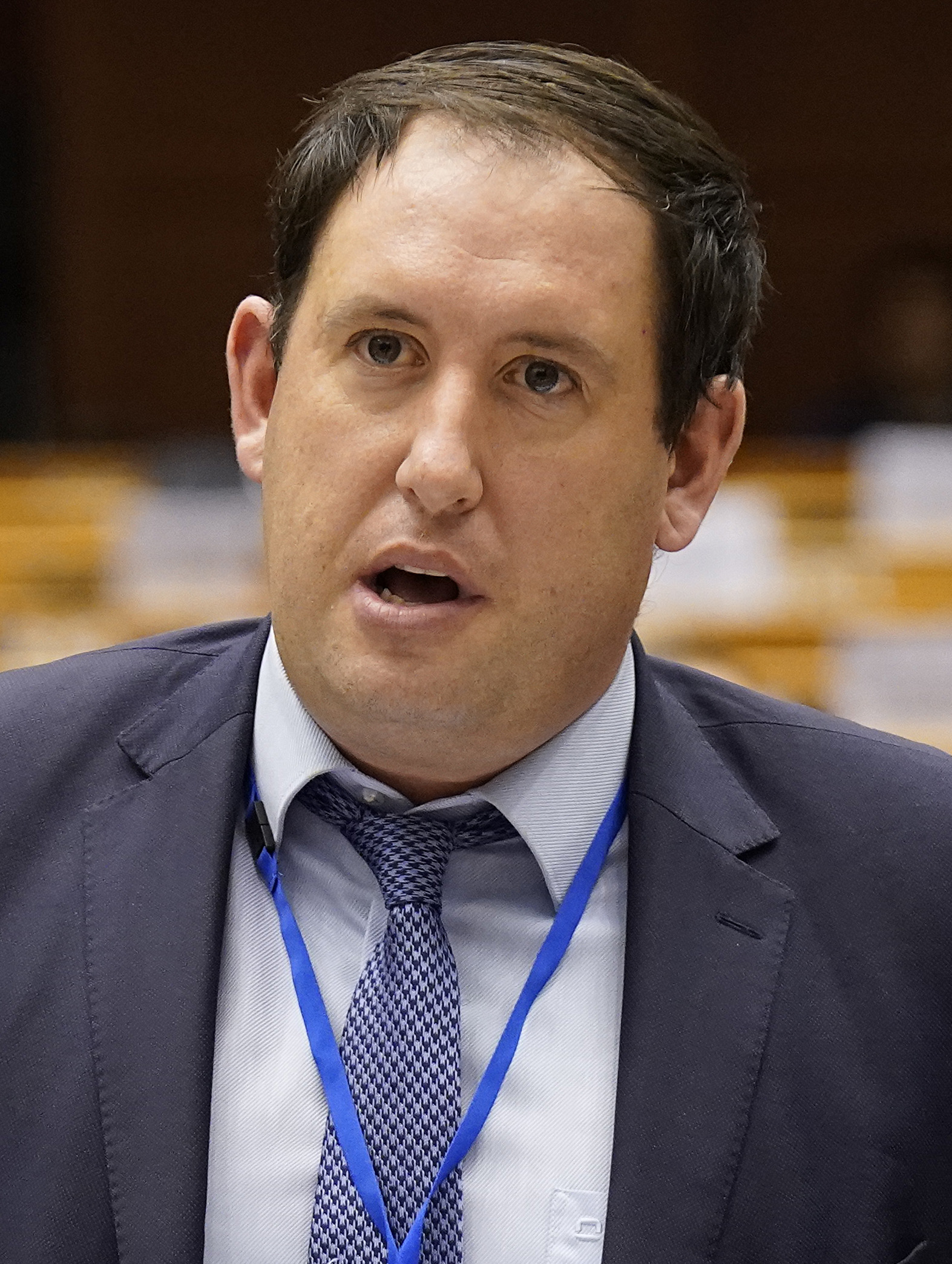
...while Kieran McCarthy managed to secure one

A candidate may be nominated by at least four county councils (including city councils and city and county councils). No council may nominate more than one person. A simple majority of voting councillors is sufficient to support a nomination. Most councils imposed no pre-conditions on prospective candidates who ask for a nomination; however, Fingal County Council required prospective candidates to be proposed by four councillors, and Offaly County Council by two councillors, to be granted an audience and be considered for a presidential nomination.

Though independent candidates had generally struggled to gain access to the ballot through the Oireachtas in the past, the council nomination route was more fruitful at the 1997, 2011 and 2018 elections, due to the less partisan nature of local politics. In 2025, Fine Gael, the second-largest party in local government, instructed its councillors to oppose any nomination at council level, though Fianna Fáil and Sinn Féin permitted a free vote.

In August, businessman Gareth Sheridan, the founder of Nutriband, confirmed previous reporting that he would be seeking to gain nominations. Sheridan, who was originally from County Tipperary but had spent much of his adult life in the United States, intended to run on a platform emphasising housing. He also drew attention to his relative youth, at 35 years old. The Irish Examiner reported that Sheridan was being introduced to councillors by Senator Sharon Keogan, though he distanced himself from her right-wing views. Sheridan was the most successful candidate at council level, winning the support of Kerry and Tipperary county councils, but failure by one vote in Meath and an unexpected defeat in Offaly on 22 September, the final day of hearings, effectively ended his chances of reaching the ballot. Kerry, Tipperary, and Waterford were the only councils to nominate a candidate. This made 2025 the first contested presidential election since 1990 in which no candidate reached the presidential ballot through the council route. Sheridan ended his campaign later that day, saying: "We gave it our best shot. We got two nominations, really encouraging. We had a pathway, and unfortunately, the pathway and the plan didn't work out." Kieran McCarthy, a former Lord Mayor of Cork, also won a council nomination from Waterford City and County Council.

==== Oireachtas nominations ====
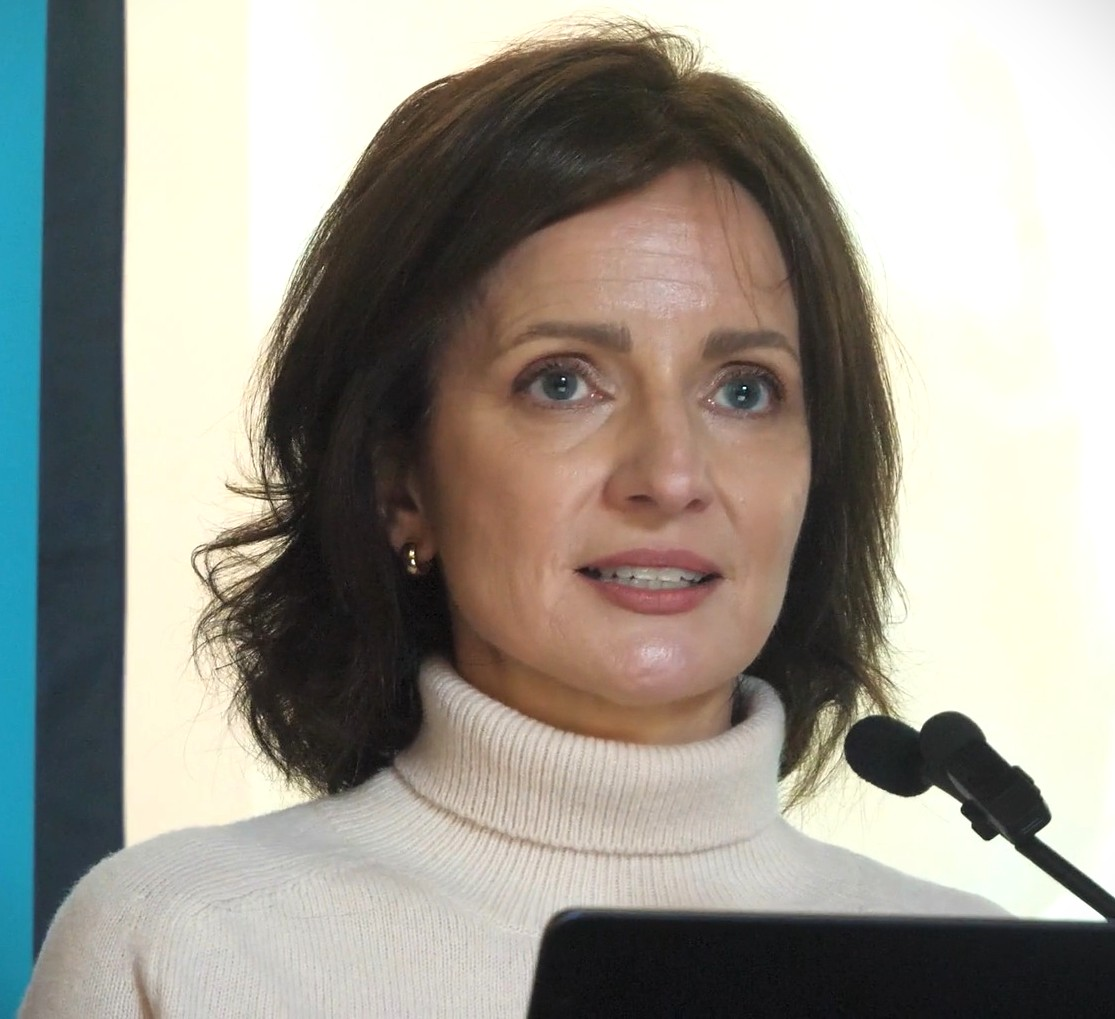
Maria Steen came within 2 backers of securing a nomination from the Oireachtas.

Aontú first expressed an interest in nominating a candidate in April. In July, party leader Peadar Tóibín said they would seek to create a "selection block" or a "nominating caucus" with other small parties and independents who would pick a candidate to represent them. The Irish Times suggested that Aontú, with three Oireachtas members, and Independent Ireland, with four, would represent the core of a potential nominating bloc. Tóibín ruled out standing himself.

On 11 September, the caucus took place, with four prospective candidates meeting a group of eleven Oireachtas members, including all three from Aontú. Media outlets reported that Maria Steen, a conservative activist and barrister known for her opposition to abortion and same-sex marriage, was one of the candidates attending, but it was not clear who the other three were. Steen had been seeking nominations through the council route, but had not yet received a nomination. Steen won the vote, and announced to reporters at Leinster House that she now had the support of ten Oireachtas members, halfway to the twenty required. However, the four Independent Ireland members said they would only sign her papers once she reached sixteen nominations.

Over the days that followed, further Oireachtas members came forward to nominate Steen. These included two independent junior ministers, Michael Healy-Rae and Marian Harkin, who had said they would vote for Heather Humphreys at the election, but supported Steen's right to be on the ballot. On 23 September, the day before the deadline for nominations, Independent Ireland reversed its stance and nominated Steen, leaving her three names short with hours to spare. Aubrey McCarthy nominated Steen on the morning of 24 September, bringing the final number up to eighteen, but the noon deadline passed with Steen two nominations short of the twenty required. (Note: Steen's 18 nominations were: Independent Ireland (4 Oireachtas members), Aontú (3 Oireachtas members) and 11 independent Oireachtas members (Paul Gogarty TD, Marian Harkin TD, Danny Healy-Rae TD, Michael Healy-Rae TD, Mattie McGrath TD, Carol Nolan TD, Gillian Toole TD, Senator Joe Conway, Senator Sharon Keogan, Senator Aubrey McCarthy, Senator Rónán Mullen).)

After the close of nominations, Steen spoke to journalists outside Leinster House, saying: "Rarely has the political consensus seemed more oppressive or detached from the wishes and desires of the public." Independent Ireland leader Michael Collins described the nomination process as "an affront to democracy". Gerard Craughwell said he was put off nominating Steen by abuse from her supporters on social media. Much media attention in the aftermath of the process focused on Steen's failure to win a nomination from Senator Michael McDowell, who had campaigned alongside her against the 2024 family and care amendments. McDowell told the Irish Independent that he did not want her to be president, saying: "I would never propose a person whose candidacy I was going to oppose." Political commentator Nick Delehanty launched a campaign for a nomination in August 2025 but was unsuccessful in securing councils support, and later joined calls for voters to spoil their ballots.

== Campaign ==
Campaigning began once candidates announced their bids, with Catherine Connolly declaring her candidacy on 11 July 2025. Her early announcement made her, for a time, the sole serious contender in the race and led to close media scrutiny of her record and political career. Alongside debate over her record on domestic issues, Connolly faced controversy regarding a 2018 visit to Syria with Clare Daly, Mick Wallace, and Maureen O'Sullivan. When launching her 2025 campaign, she defended the trip and noted she had not "uttered one word of support for Assad", though Politico noted she had not criticised Assad during the visit and had later called for the lifting of sanctions on his regime. She also drew criticism for a comment on German military spending. Her campaign, centred on housing, social equality, environmental issues, and Irish unity, was framed around grassroots engagement and independence from establishment politics, but later came under further pressure over her past hiring of a woman with a firearms conviction, which she defended as consistent with rehabilitation and inclusion. She cast herself as a left-wing opposition candidate.

Heather Humphreys launched her Fine Gael–backed campaign on 19 August 2025, emphasising community, unity, and stability, while positioning herself as an experienced and conciliatory figure suited to the presidency. During the campaign, she faced questions regarding her husband's past membership of the Orange Order, as well as scrutiny of her own childhood attendance at Orange parades, though she emphasised that she had stopped attending when the Troubles began. Her background as an Ulster Presbyterian Irish republican was also discussed favourably in the context of building common feeling in the North. There was "disgruntlement" about her promise to meaningfully improve her Irish if elected president, given she had yet to fulfil the same promise when made as minister with responsibility for the Gaeltacht. She supports removing the Triple Lock. Perceived as an "establishment candidate", Humphreys described her time in Government as being prepared to take tough decisions and summed herself up as centre-ground, pro-business and pro-European.

Jim Gavin followed on 30 August as Fianna Fáil's nominee, running on themes of service and civic duty drawn from his sporting reputation and military background. Before his campaign was derailed by controversy over an alleged rent overpayment from a former tenant, Gavin's team had also been criticised for a series of social media missteps, including posts that were perceived as awkward or poorly judged. His withdrawal on 5 October turned the contest into a de facto two-way race between Connolly and Humphreys, although legally his name must remain on the ballot. Following Gavin's withdrawal, reporting suggested there was "chaos" within the Fianna Fáil party, with many questioning the leadership and decision-making of leader Micheál Martin over his backing of Gavin as their candidate.

Major social media platforms themselves drew criticism for their lack of transparency and reliability with regard to political advertising. Several deleted or restricted access to advertising archives, and after Jim Gavin withdrew from the campaign, his campaign videos were deleted and Meta's ad library claimed the account had run no election ads in the previous week, contradicting what it had shown the day before. Deepfake videos were also circulated online.

On 17 October, Spoil Your Vote was launched as a campaign urging those unhappy with the choice of candidates to spoil their vote. Backers included entrepreneur Declan Ganley, economist Eddie Hobbs and unsuccessful presidential candidate Nick Delehanty. Independent Ireland, which had supported Maria Steen's nomination, opposed the campaign. An opinion poll on 16 October indicated that 6% of voters intended to spoil their vote, compared to between 1% and 1.25% votes spoiled in the two previous presidential elections. In Ireland, spoiled votes are counted but have no other impact on the electoral contest. The campaign was supported by independent councillors Gavin Pepper and Malachy Steenson as well as the National Party.

=== Northern Ireland ===
DUP's Deputy First Minister, Emma Little-Pengelly, insisted on not extending the presidential vote to Northern Ireland.

== Debates and television coverage ==
In June 2025, RTÉ announced that it planned to host a number of programmes in the lead up to the election; Katie Hannon will present The Katie Hannon Big Interview Live which will feature each of the presidential candidates in in-depth programmes on RTÉ One. Virgin Media One also planned to hold a series of interviews with each candidate on 6 October 13 and 20 October respectively for Gavin, Connolly and Humphreys, however Gavin suspended his campaign ahead of the scheduled interview on 6 October.

Television debates have been confirmed for the 29 September on Virgin Media One and the 5 and 21 October on RTÉ One. The first debate was described as "low-energy" and rather unsurprising. If there was a winner it was described to be Connolly "by a whisker". Radio debates have been confirmed by RTÉ Radio 1 for the Drivetime, This Week, and Morning Ireland programmes, to take place between 7 and 19 October. Unlike in 2011, when a bilingual debate was held "which generated pride regardless of political preference", TG4 decided not to hold a presidential debate. This absence was noted as something to be lamented. Connolly also expressed disappointment that no debate would be held in Irish. Though formerly the minister with responsibility for the Gaeltacht, when asked about it during the second televised debate on 5 October, Humphreys said that she would feel at a disadvantage in an Irish language debate.

2025 Irish presidential election debates
Date	Broadcaster	Moderator	Programme	Participants		
P Participant A Absent invitee W Withdrawn				Connolly	Humphreys	Gavin
29 September	Virgin Media One	Kieran Cuddihy	The Tonight Show	P	P	P
5 October	RTÉ One	Áine Lawlor	The Week in Politics	P	P	P
9 October	RTÉ Radio 1	Sarah McInerney and Cormac Ó hEadhra	Drivetime	P	P	W
12 October	RTÉ Radio 1	David McCullagh	This Week	P	P	W
14 October	Newstalk	Pat Kenny	The Pat Kenny Show	P	P	W
17 October	RTÉ Radio 1	Audrey Carville and Gavin Jennings	Morning Ireland	P	P	W
21 October	RTÉ One	Miriam O'Callaghan and Sarah McInerney	Prime Time	P	P	W

=== Debate topics ===
==== 29 September: Virgin Media ====
The first televised presidential debate of the campaign was held on Virgin Media One on 29 September. Much of the discussion focused on issues outside the president's direct powers, including the Gaza war, immigration, neutrality, housing, and Irish unification. Connolly criticised government policy and warned against the "military-industrial complex". Humphreys emphasised steadiness and inclusivity, while Gavin accused Israel of committing war crimes, called for "balanced debate" on immigration, and focused on cross-community engagement. During the debate, Connolly's previous remarks comparing Germany's current military rearmament to German rearmament in the 1930s were examined by both the moderator and her fellow candidates, prompting her to clarify that she intended to critique the use of defence spending as a means of stimulating economic growth rather than to equate contemporary Germany with historical fascism.

In response to incidents of Operation Raise the Colours occurring in Ireland, all three candidates rejected the use of the Irish tricolour as a divisive symbol. Humphreys and Gavin framed the flag as a symbol of unity and inclusion, with Gavin emphasising his Defence Forces background. Connolly said anti-immigration flag protests reflected only a small vocal minority, calling their divisive rhetoric "abhorrent". On housing, Gavin stated the situation was unacceptable but argued the president cannot build houses, though he would highlight the issue. Connolly blamed neoliberal ideology and called for a policy reset. Humphreys urged openness to solutions such as 3D-printed homes. All three backed the goal of Irish unity. Humphreys, calling herself a "proud Ulsterwoman", emphasised compromise and friendship. Gavin cited his regular work in Northern Ireland and stressed building cross-community ties. Connolly said she hoped unity could be achieved within her presidency and highlighted her engagement with both communities.

==== 5 October: RTÉ ====
On 5 October, the three presidential candidates participated in the second televised debate of the campaign on RTÉ's The Week in Politics. The discussion opened in the context of a poll showing Catherine Connolly leading, followed by Heather Humphreys and Jim Gavin. The main debate topic was Irish unity, with Gavin questioning whether the time was right for a referendum, Connolly calling for one during her term if elected, and Humphreys emphasising reconciliation between communities in Northern Ireland. The candidates also addressed controversies: Gavin over an alleged unpaid rent dispute, Connolly over employing a former Éirígí member convicted of firearms offences, and Humphreys over claims she opposed drink-driving reforms at Cabinet. Gavin also addressed the cultural issues in the defence forces raised in the documentary Women of Honour, rejecting suggestions that he or senior officers ignored misconduct, while welcoming the forthcoming tribunal into harassment and bullying allegations. Later on 5 October, Gavin announced that he was withdrawing from the election; however, his name will remain on the ballot, as a candidate may only withdraw before the ruling on nominations, which took place on 24 September.

== Opinion polling ==
=== Graphical summary ===
Graph of opinion polls conducted.

=== Polling of first preference votes only ===
Last date of polling	Commissioner	Polling firm	Sample size	Sources	Connolly	Humphreys	Gavin	Don't know	Other
23 October 2025	Irish Independent	Ireland Thinks	?		40%	25%	7%	28%	
21 October 2025	Business Post	Red C	1,012		44%	25%	10%	21%	—N/a
14 October 2025	Irish Times	Ipsos B&A	1,200		38%	20%	5%	18%	NV: 12% SV: 6%
7 October 2025	Business Post	Red C	1,001		36%	25%	12% (Note: Polling started on 2 October, three days before Gavin suspended campaign.)	27%	—N/a
5 October 2025	Jim Gavin suspends campaign								
3 October 2025	Sunday Independent	Ireland Thinks	~1,430		32%	23%	15%	30%	—N/a

=== Polling including second preference transfers and excluding don't know ===
Last date of polling	Commissioner	Polling firm	Sample size	Sources	Connolly	Humphreys	Gavin
23 October 2025	Irish Independent	Ireland Thinks			55.6%	34.7%	9.7%
21 October 2025	Business Post	Red C	1,012		61%	39%	Eliminated
21 October 2025	Business Post	Red C	1,012		55.7%	31.6%	12.7%
14 October 2025	Irish Times	Ipsos B&A	1,200		63%	35%	Eliminated
14 October 2025	Irish Times	Ipsos B&A	1,200		60%	32%	8%
7 October 2025	Business Post	Red C	1,001		55.7%	44.3%	Eliminated
7 October 2025	Business Post	Red C	1,001		49.3%	34.2%	16.5%
5 October 2025	Jim Gavin suspends campaign						
3 October 2025	Sunday Independent	Ireland Thinks	~1,430		53%	47%	Eliminated
3 October 2025	Sunday Independent	Ireland Thinks	~1,430		45.7%	32.9%	21.4%

=== Polling before close of nominations ===
Last date of polling	Commissioner	Polling firm	Ahern	Gavin	McDonald	Humphreys	Connolly	McGuinness	Other	Don't know
24 September 2025	Nomination period closes									
9 September 2025	Business Post	Red C	—N/a	18%	21% (Note: Polling was conducted from 4–9 September, with McDonald announcing she was not running on 8 September.)	22%	17%	—N/a	17% (Note: Peter Casey 6%, Maria Steen 5%, Nick Delehanty 4%, Gareth Sheridan 2%)	36%
8 September 2025	Mary Lou McDonald rules herself out									
5 September 2025	Sunday Independent	Ireland Thinks (Note: The Sunday Independent ran three simultaneous polls, one offering those polled a choice of Connolly, Gavin or Humphreys, one also offering McDonald as an option, and one also offering various independents as additional options.)	—N/a	17%	15%	20%	13%	—N/a	18% (Note: Bob Geldof 7%, Maria Steen 3%, Conor McGregor 2%, Nick Delehanty 2%, Peter Casey 1%, Gareth Sheridan 1%, Joanna Donnelly 1%, Michael Flatley 1%)	19%
5 September 2025	Sunday Independent	Ireland Thinks	—N/a	18%	17%	19%	14%	—N/a	—N/a	31%
5 September 2025	Sunday Independent	Ireland Thinks	—N/a	20%	—N/a	21%	20%	—N/a	—N/a	39%
4 September 2025	Bertie Ahern rules himself out									
16 August 2025	Sunday Independent	Ireland Thinks	14%	—N/a	14%	19%	18%	—N/a	8%	28%
14 August 2025	Mairead McGuinness withdraws									
31 July 2025	Tony Holohan	Amárach Research	15%	—N/a	20%	—N/a	22%	29%	15%	—N/a
17 July 2025	Irish Daily Mail	Amárach Research	—N/a	—N/a	45%	—N/a	—N/a	55%	—N/a	—N/a

== Results ==
2025 Irish presidential election
Candidate	Nominated by	% 1st Pref	Count 1
Catherine Connolly	Oireachtas: 7 parties and independents (Note: Sinn Féin, Social Democrats, Labour, People Before Profit, Green Party, Solidarity, and 100% Redress)	63.36%	914,143
Heather Humphreys	Oireachtas: Fine Gael	29.46%	424,987
Jim Gavin (Note: Withdrew after nominations were finalised, remained on ballot)	Oireachtas: Fianna Fáil	7.18%	103,568
Electorate: 3,614,450 Valid: 1,442,698 (39.9%) Spoilt: 213,738 (12.9% of turnout) Quota: 721,350 Turnout: 1,656,436 (45.8%)

=== Results by constituency ===
First preference votes by constituency
Constituency	Connolly		Humphreys		Gavin		Spoiled ballots (Note: The percentage of spoiled votes is out of all ballots cast, not the valid poll. Thus, the percentages sum to more than 100%.)		Turnout
Constituency	Votes	%	Votes	%	Votes	%	Votes	%	Turnout
Carlow–Kilkenny	29,697	60.99%	14,357	31.61%	3,362	7.40%	6,493	12.51%	44.47%
Cavan–Monaghan	20,723	38.33%	31,075	58.75%	1,546	2.92%	6,423	10.83%	55.41%
Clare	24,372	60.71%	10,726	26.72%	5,047	12.57%	4,766	11.87%	47.80%
Cork East	20,123	65.18%	8,717	28.24%	2,031	6.58%	4,672	13.14%	43.08%
Cork North-Central	25,402	67.79%	9,678	25.83%	2,391	6.38%	6,215	14.23%	42.80%
Cork North-West	15,610	56.52%	9,565	34.63%	2,445	8.85%	3,977	12.59%	47.30%
Cork South-Central	27,750	64.68%	12,111	28.23%	3,044	7.09%	4,935	10.32%	46.30%
Cork South-West	18,350	59.64%	10,120	32.89%	2,296	7.46%	3,562	10.38%	48.11%
Donegal	33,286	75.01%	9,316	20.99%	1,774	4.00%	6,434	12.66%	39.76%
Dublin Bay South	15,810	54.21%	11,259	38.60%	2,098	7.19%	2,590	8.16%	41.86%
Dublin Bay North	28,501	64.58%	11,815	26.77%	3,815	8.64%	7,100	13.86%	48.50%
Dublin Central	15,848	74.38%	4,176	19.60%	1,284	6.03%	3,754	14.98%	42.44%
Dublin Fingal East	15,851	61.25%	7,424	28.69%	2,606	10.07%	3,098	10.69%	47.34%
Dublin Fingal West	13,853	67.96%	4,659	22.86%	1,873	9.19%	3,119	13.27%	46.53%
Dublin Mid-West	20,412	70.83%	5,724	19.86%	2,683	9.31%	7,287	20.18%	42.42%
Dublin North-West	14,351	73.31%	3,695	18.88%	1,530	7.82%	5,033	20.45%	44.07%
Dublin Rathdown	18,523	50.75%	14,619	40.05%	3,359	9.20%	2,651	6.77%	49.04%
Dublin South-Central	18,750	78.98%	3,723	15.68%	1,266	5.33%	5,585	19.05%	41.08%
Dublin South-West	28,079	63.05%	12,375	27.79%	4,084	9.17%	7,537	14.47%	46.01%
Dublin West	18,528	63.98%	7,756	26.78%	2,676	9.24%	4,438	13.29%	43.34%
Dún Laoghaire	21,138	51.78%	16,358	40.07%	3,325	8.15%	3,468	7.83%	47.80%
Galway East	26,631	72.75%	7,858	21.47%	2,116	5.78%	5,250	12.54%	48.39%
Galway West	35,441	76.84%	8,475	18.37%	2,208	4.79%	4,420	8.74%	48.99%
Kerry	28,807	62.98%	13,568	29.66%	3,364	7.35%	7,101	13.44%	44.83%
Kildare North	25,748	62.64%	11,840	28.80%	3,516	8.55%	4,908	10.67%	48.57%
Kildare South	18,048	65.74%	7,266	26.47%	2,141	7.80%	4,904	15.15%	43.81%
Laois	15,814	65.12%	6,775	27.90%	1,694	6.98%	4,156	14.61%	43.88%
Limerick County	16,520	57.91%	9,987	35.01%	2,022	7.09%	4,283	13.05%	47.30%
Limerick City	17,659	65.43%	7,797	28.89%	1,533	5.68%	4,049	13.04%	40.90%
Longford–Westmeath	22,656	58.72%	13,162	34.11%	2,766	7.17%	6,810	15.00%	43.81%
Louth	28,006	68.65%	10,711	26.26%	2,078	5.09%	7,782	16.02%	47.10%
Mayo	28,039	65.83%	11,957	28.07%	2,596	6.10%	6,311	12.91%	45.49%
Meath East	20,772	62.63%	9,896	29.84%	2,498	7.53%	5,512	14.25%	46.42%
Meath West	15,477	64.02%	7,015	29.02%	1,684	6.97%	4,560	15.87%	44.26%
Offaly	14,240	62.56%	6,593	28.96%	1,929	8.47%	4,870	17.62%	44.65%
Roscommon–Galway	17,258	63.57%	8,129	29.94%	1,760	6.48%	3,745	12.12%	51.25%
Sligo–Leitrim	24,331	63.46%	12,024	31.36%	1,985	5.18%	4,828	11.18%	49.20%
Tipperary North	16,259	58.01%	9,217	32.89%	2,551	9.10%	3,999	12.49%	46.98%
Tipperary South	15,563	61.66%	7,793	30.88%	1,883	7.46%	3,889	13.35%	44.16%
Waterford	23,191	66.91%	9,358	27.00%	2,109	6.09%	4,828	12.22%	43.67%
Wexford	21,667	66.71%	8,733	26.89%	2,081	6.41%	4,571	12.34%	43.90%
Wicklow	23,701	63.91%	10,658	28.74%	2,727	7.35%	5,681	13.28%	51.65%
Wicklow–Wexford	15,808	64.45%	6,927	28.24%	1,792	7.31%	4,144	14.45%	47.21%
Total	914,143	63.36%	424,987	29.46%	103,568	7.18%	213,738	12.90%	45.83%

== Reactions ==
=== Domestic ===
==== Republic of Ireland ====
At around 14:20, Heather Humphreys conceded the election before all the votes were counted after it was expected to be a landslide victory for Catherine Connolly. Outgoing president Michael D. Higgins congratulated Connolly. Sinn Féin leader Mary Lou McDonald, said of the result: "Sinn Féin arrived at the moment where momentum had to be established and built, and we achieved with others precisely that." Taoiseach Micheál Martin released a statement after Connolly's victory in the election, congratulating her and saying: "The people have made their choice and I have no doubt Catherine Connolly will serve the country well."

==== Northern Ireland ====
Michelle O'Neill, the Northern Ireland first minister from Sinn Féin, said of the result that it marked "an era of hope", and added: "This election has shown what can be achieved when parties committed to change and progress work together in common purpose. That is the clear pathway to a better, united future. I look forward to working with Catherine in the time ahead, for all the people of our island." SDLP leader Claire Hanna congratulated Connolly and added: "The President of Ireland is far more than a symbolic figure. The SDLP believes President Connolly can use her term to provide a platform for honest discussion about a New Ireland. This conversation is not going away, and the president has a unique convening role in helping to shape it." Hanna also said that she would "do everything possible to ensure this is the final time Irish citizens here are unable to vote in a presidential election." Alliance deputy leader Eóin Tennyson congratulated Connolly and added that the presidency "has long played an important role in promoting reconciliation and mutual respect on and between these islands." Contrarily, UUP leader Mike Nesbitt congratulated Connolly, but added that unionism would "see challenges ahead" and further said: "She will be aware of the concerns of the Protestant, unionist and loyalist communities here in Northern Ireland, and those within her own jurisdiction concerning her political and geopolitical views, not least regarding the future constitutional status of Northern Ireland."

More broadly, Unionist politicians raised concerns that the election saw instances of sectarianism being displayed in the Republic, particularally in relation to Heather Humphreys. TUV leader Jim Allister described the campaign as setting back the cause of an all-Ireland project and said the treatment of Humphreys "exposed the ugly undercurrent of intolerance that still runs through southern politics", while Mike Nesbitt stated that he would be "remiss not to deplore the reaction of many to Heather Humphreys' background as a Protestant" and that "Even the response to her tangential association with the Orange Order stands in contrast to the acceptance of elected representatives from other traditions in the Northern Ireland Assembly". In response, Mary Lou McDonald said that "sectarian abuse is never acceptable, it’s never okay", and called for a more inclusive, respectful public discourse across the island. She argued that people must be "not just tolerant but inclusive and genuinely open to people all across the island of all traditions," stating there was a "piece of work to be done" on inclusivity, and expressed confidence that Catherine Connolly, as president, "will lead substantially on this in having those open, respectful conversations".

=== International ===
- United Kingdom: MP Jeremy Corbyn, an Independent MP for Islington North and former Leader of the Labour Party from 2015 to 2020, congratulated Connolly and said: "Catherine will be a voice for peace, social justice and a united Ireland. This is a landslide victory for humanity and for hope!"
- Scotland: First Minister John Swinney congratulated Connolly on her election, and said: "I look forward to working with her to nurture the deep relationship between Ireland and Scotland."
- Palestine: The Embassy of Palestine to Ireland congratulated Connolly on her election, and said: "A voice for justice and a long-time supporter of the Palestinian people and our just cause. The very best wishes to her as she represents the people of Ireland."
- France: President Emmanuel Macron said: "Sincere congratulations, Catherine Connolly, on your election as President of Ireland. Thank you, President Michael D. Higgins, for these years of shared work and friendship. France, Ireland's closest EU neighbour."
- United States: Ilhan Omar, a Democratic Member of Congress from Minnesota's 5th congressional district, said: "Congratulations to Catherine on her historic victory as the next President of Ireland. I know she will lead with compassion, peace, and justice at the forefront. This is a win for all of humanity!"

=== Religious ===
Roman Catholic archbishop of Armagh Eamon Martin commented on the result toward Connolly: "May the Holy Spirit inspire her to be a faithful servant leader for Irish citizens everywhere, building peace and reconciliation on our island." Moderator of the Presbyterian Church in Ireland, Trevor Gribben, said that Connolly and her family "can be assured" of the church's prayers.

=== Media ===
The Irish Mirror headlined the result as "Youthquakes, spoiler votes and a new populist threat". The Guardian reported that Connolly's landslide victory was seen as a rebuke to the centre-right ruling coalition, and described it as a "stunning political feat". BBC News noted the low turnout and that many spoilt ballots had anti-government messages.

== Analysis ==
Connolly performed best in Dublin South-Central, Galway West, and Donegal, where she received over three-quarters of the valid poll. Cavan–Monaghan was the only constituency won by Heather Humphreys, which she represented from 2011 to 2024; her home county is Monaghan. The number of spoiled ballots in this election was the highest in any modern Irish election; in the constituencies of Dublin Mid-West, Dublin North-West, and Dublin South-Central, there were more spoiled votes than votes for Heather Humphreys. Following the poor performance of Fianna Fáil in the presidential election, senior TDs Willie O'Dea, Seán Ó Fearghaíl and Pat 'the Cope’ Gallagher issued a statement criticising the party leadership's handling of the campaign and its aftermath, with reference to "the top-down autocratic style of politics" within the internal culture of the party.

== See also ==
- 2025 elections in the European Union
