= Gareth Sheridan =

Irish entrepreneur and businessman

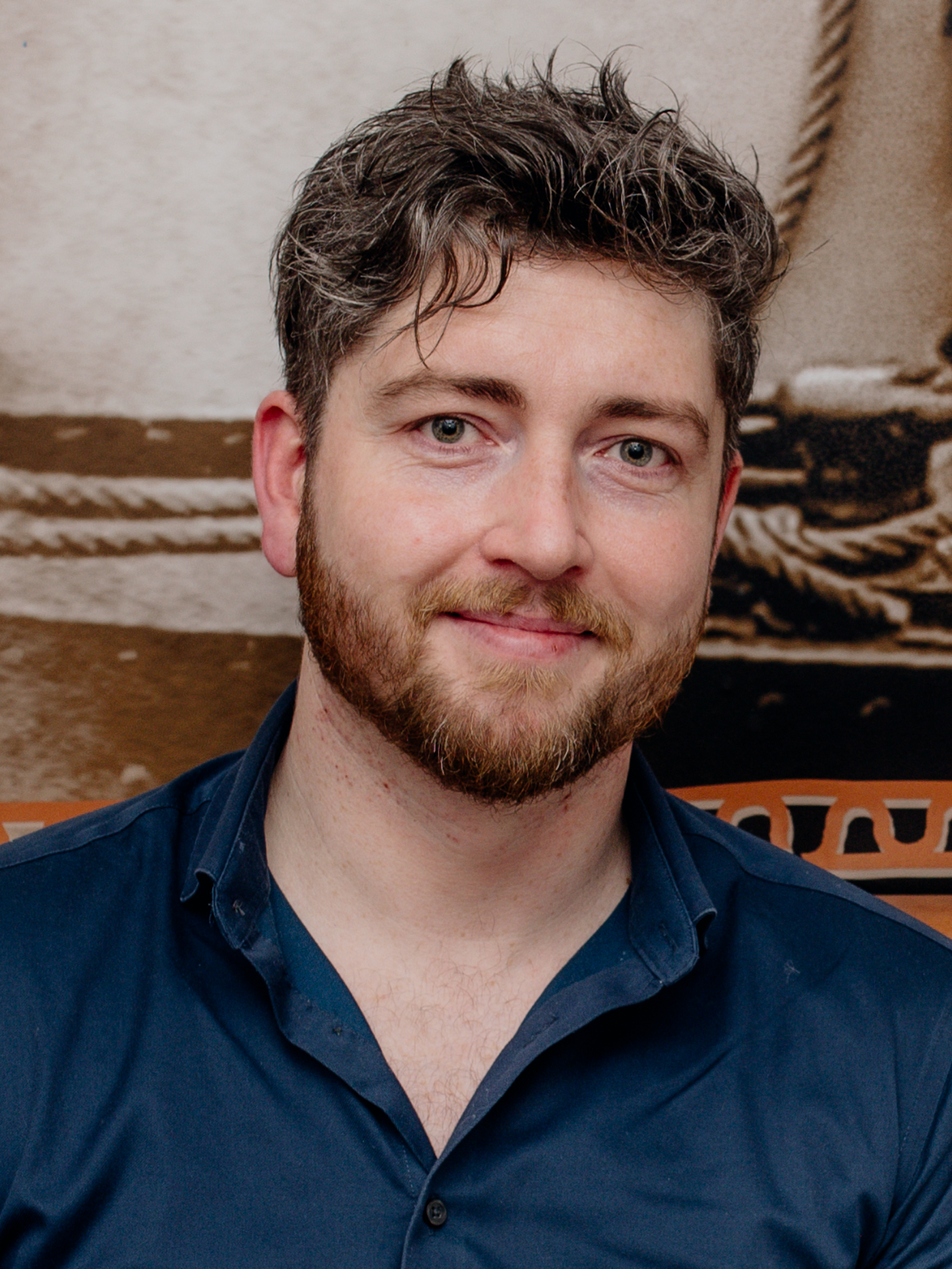
- Sheridan in 2026
- Born: 1989 or 1990; Dublin, Ireland
- Education: Dublin Institute of Technology
- Occupation: Businessman
- Known for: Nutriband Founder, Prospective Irish presidential candidate
- Children: 1

Gareth Sheridan (born 1989 or 1990) is an Irish entrepreneur and the founder of Nutriband Inc., a pharmaceutical company that develops transdermal drug delivery systems. He sought to run in the 2025 Irish presidential election by soliciting nominations from several city and county councils, but failed to secure the required four councils' support required.

== Early life and education ==
Sheridan was born (in 1989 or 1990) in the suburb of Terenure in Dublin, Ireland. He went to school at Terenure College and Stratford College and then studied business and management at Dublin Institute of Technology.

== Career ==
Sheridan founded Nutriband Ltd. in Dublin in 2012 during the final year of his studies, though he had no background in the pharma or biotech industry. The company initially focused on supplement delivery through transdermal patches. Sheridan established Nutriband Inc. in the United States with headquarters in Orlando, Florida.

The company develops transdermal systems to deliver opioid medications, where the incorporation of capsaicin and denatonium benzoate is intended to deter misuse. In February 2018, Seán Gallagher became president of Nutriband, staying for four years. In December 2018, Sheridan and his co-founder, Serguei Melnik, were fined $25,000 each by the SEC for making misleading statements about the FDA's regulation of Nutriband's products.

Following several attempts, the company went public on the NASDAQ stock exchange in October 2021 under the ticker symbol NTRB.

As chief executive of Nutriband, Sheridan was interviewed by The Guardian and the BBC about the potential impact of proposed tariffs on global pharmaceutical supply chains. Sheridan stated that tariffs on pharmaceutical imports could disrupt global supply chains and increase costs for patients. Speaking to the BBC in April 2025, he stated that "these types of treatments can't afford a disruption in the global supply chain", drawing comparisons between pharmaceutical and automotive tariffs. Quoted during March 2025 in Ireland's Business Post, he stated that "ultimately, people will die" if pharmaceutical tariffs are implemented.

Sheridan temporarily stepped aside from his role as CEO of Nutriband in 2025 while he began his bid for the Irish presidency, citing his need to focus on securing support from local authorities for nomination to appear on the ballot.

== 2025 presidential campaign ==
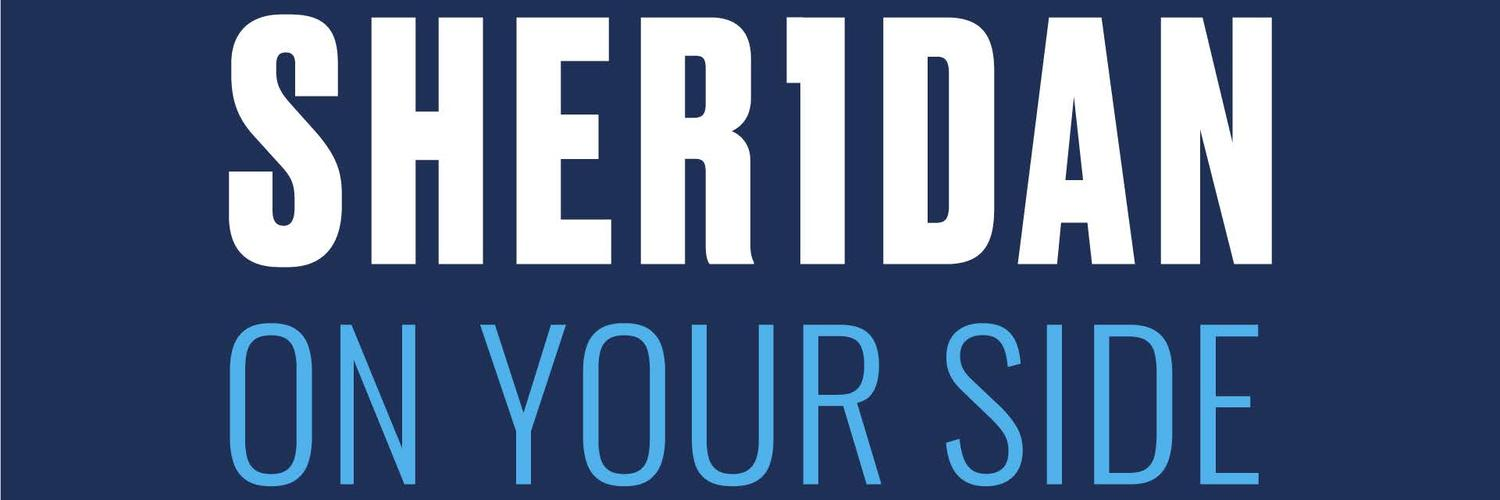
Sheridan's campaign logo

In August 2025, Sheridan held a press conference announcing his intention to contest the 2025 Irish presidential election. He stood on a platform of housing and centering on his age. With the help of Sharon Keogan, he ultimately secured nominations from just two of the four required councils, with both Kerry County Council and Tipperary County Council agreeing to nominate him as a candidate. He suspended his campaign on 22 September 2025 and was unsuccessful in getting on the ballot.

Later in that year, he was photographed at a Christmas party hosted by Tucker Carlson and photographed with right-wing figures Candace Owens and Russell Brand, as well as other celebrities.

== Recognition ==
In 2014, Sheridan was named as South Dublin's "Best Young Entrepreneur" by the South Dublin Local Enterprise Office. In 2016, he was chosen as a Nissan Ireland "Generation Next" spokesperson.

In 2025, Sheridan was named as a finalist in the EY Entrepreneur of the Year awards in the "established" category. He reportedly withdrew from the awards, in August 2025, to focus on his presidential campaign.

He is an "Entrepreneurial Ambassador" with the School of Management, People and Organisation in TU Dublin.

== Personal life ==
While establishing Nutriband, he lived in Utah. He is married to Heidi, who is from Salt Lake City. They have an adopted daughter. They moved to Dublin in 2025 for a higher quality of life.
