= Omni Park =

Suburban shopping facility in northern Dublin, Ireland

Omni Park Shopping and Leisure
- Location: Santry, Dublin, Ireland
- Coordinates: 53.3925°N 6.2473°W
- Address: Swords Road, Dublin 9
- Opened: 1991
- Owner: McKeon and Kennedy Families
- Num. of stores: 86
- Num. of anchor tenants: 2
- Floor area: 28,600 square metres (308,000 sq ft)
- Floors: 2
- Website: www.omnipark.ie

Omni Park is a large shopping centre and retail park in the Santry area of north Dublin, Ireland. It is located close to the M50 motorway. It comprises over 28,600 square metres (308,000 sq ft) of retail space in 86 retail units over 2 floors of an indoor shopping mall and also several outlets externally. Units range from 49 square metres (530 sq ft) to 3,213 square metres (34,580 sq ft). The Omni also features a selection of eateries, a Catholic Oratory and an 11 screen cinema called IMC (formerly called Omniplex). The centre has surface and multi-storey car parking.

In 2005, additional development was undertaken with the construction of a multi-storey car park and a new mall which included office suites on the third floor. Jack & Jones, Vero Moda, Elvery's, Lifestyle Sports, Carraig Donn, and Easons all occupied space in the new mall, with a number of vacant units waiting for retail tenants on the upper mall. A new boardwalk/retail park was also constructed with outlets including Boots, Starbucks, and Nando's.

Omni Park's main anchor tenants are Penneys and Tesco Ireland. Other retailers include Superdrug, Marks and Spencers, Holland and Barrett, and Specsavers.

Since 2012, Omni Park Shopping Centre is home to the Santry post office which relocated from nearby Santry Avenue.

In 2014, Lidl completed the construction of their unit within the Omni Park Shopping Centre. The construction of the Lidl store provided an additional 150 car parking spaces. As part of the planning permission for the Lidl unit, three further retail units received planning. These units provide for space ranging from 384 square metres (4,130 sq ft) to 600 square metres (6,500 sq ft).

In 2025, the Omni shopping centre was the shooting location for the music video for 'Euro-Country (song)' by Irish singer-songwriter CMAT.
