= Take a Sexy Picture of Me =

Single by CMAT

from the album Euro-Country
- Released: 7 May 2025
- Genre: Indie pop
- Length: 3:49
- Label: CMATBaby; AWAL
- Songwriter: Ciara Mary-Alice Thompson
- Producers: Oli Deakin; CMAT

CMAT singles chronology
"Running/Planning" (2025)	"Take a Sexy Picture of Me" (2025)	"The Jamie Oliver Petrol Station" (2025)

Music video
- "Take a Sexy Picture of Me" music video on YouTube

"Take a Sexy Picture of Me" is a song by Irish singer-songwriter CMAT which was released on 7 May 2025 as the second single from her third studio album, Euro-Country. It was written by CMAT, who co-produced the track with Oli Deakin. Lyrically, the song is a rejection of the criticism CMAT has received about her physical appearance since being in the public eye. "Take a Sexy Picture of Me" made the top 100 of the UK singles chart, her first single to do so, and also reached number 22 on the Irish Singles Chart.

== Background ==
CMAT announced her third studio album, Euro-Country on 25 March 2025. She revealed the full track list a few days later on 31 March, with "Take a Sexy Picture of Me" featuring as the sixth track.

Of the song, CMAT stated: "With the internet, every woman is now in the public eye. And no matter who you are, or what you look like, somebody will take umbrage with the fact that you even exist, and there's no escaping it. 'Take a Sexy Picture of Me' was born out of that, because I held back for so long; not out of frustration or sadness for myself, because I am in the public eye, but I realised it's actually like this for every woman. It's all women, all the time. That song is me calling out anyone who criticised my weight or how I looked... and it's one of the best songs I've ever made."

== Music video ==
The official music video for the song premiered on 7 May 2025. It received over 1 million views in less than one month. The video begins with a clip of CMAT wearing a strapless red mini dress cutting a ribbon with oversized scissors to celebrate the opening of a lingere boutique called "Sexy 4 U" she is accompanied by two mascots a woman dressed as a €1 coin and a dog in a tuxedo . There are various clips of her in various photo shoot settings such as a VIP area of a club with a man in a suit, a 90s style music video with blue silk curtains and two backup dancers, and an American desert like setting where she is dressed in a cheetah print outfit as well as outside the boutique. The video ends with her sitting in a dressing room as a stage manager gets her attention revealing it was all a daydream.

== Charts ==
=== Weekly charts ===
Weekly chart performance for "Take a Sexy Picture of Me"
Chart (2025)	Peak position
Estonia Airplay (TopHit)	60
Ireland (IRMA)	22
UK Singles (Official Charts)	42
UK Indie (Official Charts)	8
UK Singles Downloads (OCC)	33

=== Monthly charts ===
Monthly chart performance for "Take a Sexy Picture of Me"
Chart (2025)	Peak position
Estonia Airplay (TopHit)	89

== Certifications ==
Certifications for "Take a Sexy Picture of Me"
Region	Certification	Certified units/sales
United Kingdom (BPI)	Silver	200,000^{‡}
^{‡} Sales+streaming figures based on certification alone.
