= I Wanna Be a Cowboy, Baby! =

Single by CMAT

from the album Diet Baby and If My Wife New I'd Be Dead
- Released: 23 September 2020
- Genre: Country; Americana
- Length: 5:10
- Label: CMATBaby; AWAL
- Songwriter: Ciara Mary-Alice Thompson
- Producer: Oli Deakin

CMAT singles chronology
"Rodney" (2020)	"I Wanna Be a Cowboy, Baby!" (2020)	"Uncomfortable Christmas" (2020)

Music video
- "I Wanna Be a Cowboy, Baby!" music video on YouTube

"I Wanna Be a Cowboy, Baby!" is a song by Irish singer-songwriter CMAT. It was released on 23 September 2020 as the third single from her debut extended play Diet Baby (2021). It was also included on her debut studio album If My Wife New I'd Be Dead. It was written by CMAT and produced Oli Deakin. The track explores the anxiety around feeling restrained and dissatisfied with your life and wishing for more freedom, purpose and fulfilment.

== Background ==
Discussing the content of the song, CMAT explained, "It's mainly about urban isolation, about having all of the freedom and resources to do whatever you want but still choosing to do nothing out of deeply-embedded social anxiety and detachment from your own emotions. Sometimes you just turn around and ask yourself, 'Why is my life crap? I don't do anything, Why not?'. I never really have an answer to that, but I wish it was different. I want to be a cowboy instead." She stated that the idea of the song came to her when she was living alone in Manchester and was inspired by a Vine clip of a man drinking beer in the playground, which she felt was "representative of pure freedom", and her perception that the men in classic Western films were always afforded more freedom than the women, noting "they are always being told that the pursuit of independence is a reckless act which jeopardises your safety. I'm sick of it. I just wanna be a cowboy."

== Music video ==
The song's official music video premiered on 1 October 2020 and was directed by Sarah Corcoran and is a reimagining of the 1953 George Stevens Western film Shane as a Dublin barbeque, with CMAT arriving at a large house on horseback and exploring the different rooms, which are set up like an old-fashioned saloon. These scenes are interspersed with clips of CMAT and the patrons line-dancing. CMAT revealed that she learned to horse ride for the video, and refused to release the song until she was able to do so. CMAT stated “The fight scene between the two lads is a direct visual reference [to the film], and everything else was basically me and Sarah, the director, trying to marry visuals of a golden age Western movie with a boozy Dublin barbeque. My proudest achievement in life so far is that i got my baby cousins to dance in one of my music videos. They completely upstaged me and I couldn’t be more delighted about it."

The music video featured cameos from journalist Louise Bruton and Drag Queen Viola Gayvis.

== Charts ==
Chart performance for "I Wanna Be a Cowboy, Baby!"
Chart (2026)	Peak position
UK Singles Sales (OCC)	9
