= Crazymad, for Me =

Studio album by CMAT
- Released: 13 October 2023
- Genres: Pop; country
- Length: 48:43
- Labels: CMATBaby; AWAL
- Producer: Matias Tellez

CMAT chronology
If My Wife New I'd Be Dead (2022)	Crazymad, for Me (2023)	Euro-Country (2025)

Singles from Crazymad, for Me
- 1. "Whatever's Inconvenient" Released: 19 April 2023; 2. "Have Fun!" Released: 31 May 2023; 3. "Where Are Your Kids Tonight?" Released: 12 July 2023; 4. "Stay for Something" Released: 5 September 2023

Crazymad, for Me is the second studio album by the Irish pop musician CMAT, released on 13 October 2023 through CMATBaby and AWAL. The album includes a guest appearance from the American alternative rock singer John Grant and was preceded by the lead single "Whatever's Inconvenient". It received acclaim from critics, and was nominated for the 2024 Mercury Prize.

== Background ==
Described as a concept album about a 47-year-old CMAT time travelling back to the past to prevent herself from being in a relationship that "ruined her life", as well as "an abstract break-up album" about "what happens when you are still angry about something that happened 10 years ago".

== Critical reception ==
Professional ratings
Aggregate scores
Source	Rating
Metacritic	84/100
Review scores
Source	Rating
And It Don't Stop	A−
DIY	5/5 stars
The Line of Best Fit	9/10
Mojo	4/5 stars
NME	4/5 stars
The Skinny	4/5 stars

Crazymad, for Me received a score of 84 out of 100 on review aggregator Metacritic based on 12 critics' reviews, indicating "universal acclaim". Sarah Jamieson of DIY wrote that CMAT "transforms pop culture into poetry, painting the most vivid of worlds in the process, while her brand of country-indebted pop feels even richer this time around". The Skinny's Skye Butchard found it to be "funnier, weirder, and plays with a more colourful blend of Americana" than CMAT's debut studio album, and felt that it "also reveals more depth and ambition. For one, it's a breakup album that's not shy about admitting flaws in its protagonist". Tilly Foulkes of NME summarised the album as "brilliant" as well as "inventive, intoxicating, deliciously camp – she continues to transcend all expectations and remains absolutely unmatched".

Mojo called it "hyper-melancholic [and] ultra-vivid" and observed that it "showcases Thompson's off-beam pop skills, a distinctive voice in every way". Adam Wright of The Line of Best Fit described the album as a "unique piece of work; creating a psychedelic soundscape with a foundation of country-influenced chord progressions. Its themes of heartbreak and regret meanwhile are, of course, commonly walked paths but it's the presentation of such themes that give the album its edge".

Music critic Robert Christgau compared CMAT to fellow singer SZA, highlighting their common "pervasive theme" of "serial coitus". He added that "CMAT's singing is leaner, cuter, and by no means shy about trying hard."

The Guardian ranked it the 50th best album of 2023.

== Track listing ==
All tracks are written by Ciara Mary-Alice Thompson, except where noted.

Crazymad, for Me track listing
No.	Title	Writer(s)	Length
1.	"California"		4:05
2.	"Phone Me"	Thompson; Alan Farrell	3:24
3.	"Vincent Kompany"	Thompson; Declan McKenna	3:01
4.	"Such a Miranda"		2:35
5.	"Rent"		4:42
6.	"Where Are Your Kids Tonight?" (featuring John Grant)		5:26
7.	"Can't Make Up My Mind"		4:24
8.	"Whatever's Inconvenient"	Thompson; Joshua McClorey	4:27
9.	"I... Hate Who I Am When I'm Horny"		5:13
10.	"Torn Apart"		3:20
11.	"Stay for Something"	Thompson; Benjamin Francis Leftwich; King Ed	3:36
12.	"Have Fun!"	Thompson; Rob Milton	4:30
Total length:			48:43

== Personnel ==
- CMAT – vocals, backing vocals, acoustic guitar (track 4), drums (track 10)
- Mattias Tellez – electric guitar, acoustic guitar (except track 9), bass guitar (track 5), drums (tracks 5 and 10), synthesizer (tracks 6–8, 10 and 11), tambourine (tracks 6, 10 and 11), organ (tracks 7 and 8), Wurlitzer (track 7), programming (tracks 10 and 12)
- Øyvind Blomstrøm – electric guitar (except tracks 2, 4 and 10)
- Colm Conlan – Wurlitzer (tracks 1, 2, 7 and 8), piano (tracks 3, 6, 9 and 12)
- Chris Holm – bass guitar (all except tracks 4 and 10)
- Kim Åge Furuhaug – drums (all except tracks 4, 8 and 10)
- Mari Persen – violin (tracks 1–3, 12)
- Oliver Hill – violin, string arrangement (track 8)
- Éna Brennan – string arrangement (track 2)
- Declan McKenna – backing vocals, shaker, banjo (track 3)
- John Grant – vocals (track 6)
- Matt Barrick – drums (track 8)
- Josh Kaufman – guitar, bass, keys, synthesizer (track 8)

== Charts ==
Chart performance for Crazymad, for Me
Chart (2023)	Peak position
Irish Albums (Official Charts)	1
Scottish Albums (Official Charts)	14
UK Albums (Official Charts)	25
UK Independent Albums (Official Charts)	4
