= If My Wife New I'd Be Dead =

Studio album by CMAT
- Released: 25 February 2022
- Recorded: November 2019 – July 2021
- Studios: Hillcrest, Ealing, London, UK; Moultrie, Brooklyn, US
- Genre: Country pop
- Length: 51:00
- Labels: CMATBaby; AWAL
- Producer: Oli Deakin

CMAT chronology
Diet Baby (2021)	If My Wife New I'd Be Dead (2022)	Crazymad, for Me (2023)

Singles from If My Wife New I'd Be Dead
- 1. "2 Wrecked 2 Care" Released: 23 June 2021; 2. "No More Virgos" Released: 27 October 2021; 3. "Lonely" Released: 12 January 2022; 4. "Every Bottle (Is My Boyfriend)" Released: 23 February 2022

If My Wife New I'd Be Dead is the debut studio album by Irish musician CMAT, released on 25 February 2022 through CMATBaby and AWAL. It was produced by Oli Deakin, and debuted at number one on the Irish Albums Chart. It received acclaim from critics and later won the Choice Music Prize for Album of the Year.

The album includes the singles "I Wanna Be a Cowboy, Baby!" and "I Don't Really Care for You" from CMAT's debut EP Diet Baby.

== Critical reception ==
Professional ratings
Aggregate scores
Source	Rating
Metacritic	85/100
Review scores
Source	Rating
AllMusic	4/5 stars
And It Don't Stop	A
Mojo	4/5 stars
NME	4/5 stars
PopMatters	8/10
Sputnikmusic	4.5/5 stars
XS Noize	8/10

If My Wife New I'd Be Dead received a score of 85 out of 100 on review aggregator Metacritic based on nine critics' reviews.

Mark Deming of AllMusic called it "a witty and thoroughly delightful debut" and felt that CMAT's "voice is strong enough and boasts enough personality to make her persona come to life, and her songs hit a charming midpoint between small-town gossip and show-stopping tunes from the West End musical that exists only in CMAT's mind".

Mojo wrote that "five minutes in her personal company would likely be exhausting, but for this album's duration her brain salad music is fantastical".

Lucy O'Toole of Hot Press wrote that the album was "undoubtedly one of the most thrilling Irish pop debuts of the century".

Lisa Wright of DIY rated the album 4 stars and wrote that it feels like a more well-rounded, modern proposition than one solely indebted to the oldest style going could suggest."

Music critic Robert Christgau wrote in his monthly column that the singer-songwriter was "gifted with a high IQ, a wide-open sense of humor, and an exuberant plus-size soprano with no discernible corners in it". He ranked the album third on his 2023 Dean's List.

== Track listing ==
All tracks are written by Ciara Mary-Alice Thompson.

If My Wife New I'd Be Dead track listing
No.	Title	Length
1.	"Nashville"	5:16
2.	"I Don't Really Care for You"	4:04
3.	"Peter Bogdanovich"	4:37
4.	"No More Virgos"	4:03
5.	"Lonely"	4:44
6.	"Groundhog Day"	4:42
7.	"Communion"	2:59
8.	"Every Bottle (Is My Boyfriend)"	4:48
9.	"2 Wrecked 2 Care"	4:01
10.	"Geography Teacher"	3:54
11.	"I Wanna Be a Cowboy, Baby!"	5:10
12.	"I'd Want U"	3:23
Total length:		51:00

If My Wife New I'd Be Dead (Deluxe) track listing
No.	Title	Length
13.	"Geography Teacher" (Rock n Roll version)	3:37
14.	"No More Virgos" (country version)	4:25
15.	"Communion" (country version)	3:54
16.	"I Wanna Be a Cowboy, Baby!" (acoustic)	5:49

== Personnel ==
- CMAT – vocals, guitar on "2 Wrecked 2 Care", Omnichord on "Peter Bogdanovich", banjo on "Geography Teacher" and "I'd Want You"
- Oli Deakin – producer, mixing, guitar, lap steel, banjo, bass guitar, piano, synthesizer, strings, percussion, glockenspiel, clarinet, Casiotone, Wurlitzer, organ
- Morgan Karabel - drums
- Joe Lambert – mastering
- Rachel O'Regan – artwork and layout

== Charts ==
Chart performance for If My Wife New I'd Be Dead
Chart (2022)	Peak position
Irish Albums (IRMA)	1
Irish Independent Albums (IRMA)	1
