= Euro-Country =

Studio album by CMAT
- Released: 29 August 2025
- Studios: Low Pines (Brooklyn); Lightshow (Brooklyn); Rancho Deluxe (Nashville)
- Genres: Indie pop; country
- Length: 49:26
- Labels: CMATBaby; AWAL
- Producer: Oli Deakin

CMAT chronology
Crazymad, for Me (2023)	Euro-Country (2025)

Singles from Euro-Country
- 1. "Running/Planning" Released: 25 March 2025; 2. "Take a Sexy Picture of Me" Released: 7 May 2025; 3. "The Jamie Oliver Petrol Station" Released: 19 June 2025; 4. "Euro-Country" Released: 22 July 2025; 5. "When a Good Man Cries" Released: 28 August 2025

Euro-Country (stylised in all caps) is the third studio album by the Irish musician CMAT. It was released on 29 August 2025 through CMATBaby and AWAL.

== Background ==
On 25 March 2025, CMAT announced her third studio album, Euro-Country, in which she also released the album's lead single "Running/Planning". She describes the album as the "type of loss, pain and lack of community that she feels that are suffering from under modern capital isolation" and the "best thing she has ever made".

On 7 May 2025, the album's second single "Take a Sexy Picture of Me" was released. Its video received over 1 million views in less than one month. On 19 June, CMAT released "The Jamie Oliver Petrol Station".

On 22 July 2025, the single "Euro-Country" was released. On its first playing on BBC Radio 1, the opening of the song, which features just over 40 seconds in the Irish language, was edited from the play. CMAT confirmed on social media that she was not aware that the song would be edited. The BBC later denied editing the song saying they had broadcast a radio edit that had been supplied to them by the record company.

The album cover features an image of CMAT emerging from a fountain in the middle of a shopping center near her hometown of Dunboyne. The image is based on Jean-Leon Gerome's 1896 painting "Truth Coming Out of Her Well".

== Touring ==
CMAT announced tour dates in 2025 to support the album including dates in the United Kingdom, Ireland, and North America. The tour, originally set to begin in October 2025, was postponed due to the singer's recovery from wisdom tooth surgery, with the rescheduled tour set to begin in November 2025. She performed on the Pyramid Stage at the 2025 Glastonbury Festival. Further dates in Australia were announced in September 2025, with an additional two shows announced a week later due to selling out.

== Critical reception ==
Professional ratings
Aggregate scores
Source	Rating
Metacritic	88/100
Review scores
Source	Rating
And It Don't Stop	A−
DIY (magazine)	5/5 stars
The Guardian	5/5 stars
The Independent	4/5 stars
The Irish Times	4/5 stars
The Line of Best Fit	8/10
NME	5/5 stars
Pitchfork	7.7/10
Pop Matters	8/10
Rolling Stone	4/5 stars

The album was met with critical acclaim upon release. At Metacritic, which assigns a normalized rating out of 100 to reviews from mainstream critics, the album has an average score of 88, based on fifteen reviews, indicating "universal acclaim".

Rachel Aroesti, in a five-star review for The Guardian, called Thompson a "total one-off", and called the album "exceptional because of how Thompson constantly strives – sometimes wryly, sometimes earnestly, always entertainingly – to capture messy psychological entrails that don't fit the template of the typical pop song." In December 2025, The Guardian included Euro-Country in their list of the top 50 best albums of 2025, as the second best album of the year.

Awarding the album a full five stars for NME, Andrew Trendell concluded that "Euro-Country has the courage and the consistency to land high on the fast-approaching end-of-year lists, and to make CMAT the icon she’s been giving all this time". The album would later place fourth in NME's top 50 Albums Of The Year.

In her review in Pitchfork, Laura Snapes called it "a lonely album with a whopping heart, a hungry siren call for connection", and called Thompson "a true original".

Music critic Robert Christgau described the record as "phenomenally musical and phenomenally odd" and named it the second-best album of 2025.

In December 2025, The Economist included Euro-Country in their list of the ten best albums of 2025: "An Irish singer with a superb voice toys with the conventions of country music for a modern world. There is much to love here—a particular highlight is a song in which she goes into a reverie while browsing deli goods at a petrol station."

== Accolades ==
On 10 September 2025, Euro-Country was announced as one of 12 nominees for the 2025 Mercury Prize.

== Track listing ==
All tracks are written by Ciara Mary-Alice Thompson, alongside additional writers as noted.

Euro-Country track listing
No.	Title	Writer(s)	Length
1.	"Billy Byrne from Ballybrack, the Leader of the Pigeon Convoy"	William Byrne	0:57
2.	"Euro-Country"		4:56
3.	"When a Good Man Cries"		4:32
4.	"The Jamie Oliver Petrol Station"		5:23
5.	"Tree Six Foive"	Oli Deakin	3:51
6.	"Take a Sexy Picture of Me"		3:49
7.	"Ready"	Jonny Lattimer; Rich Cooper	3:36
8.	"Iceberg"	Tori Tuller; Cameron Neal	4:17
9.	"Coronation St."		4:02
10.	"Lord, Let That Tesla Crash"		5:06
11.	"Running/Planning"		4:26
12.	"Janis Joplining"		4:24
Total length:			49:26

=== Note ===
- "Euro-Country" is stylised in all caps.

== Personnel ==
Credits adapted from the album's liner notes.

- Ciara Mary-Alice Thompson – co-production (all tracks); Mellotron (tracks 1, 2), vocals (2–12), backing vocals (2, 3, 5–12)
- Oli Deakin – production, engineering (all tracks); synthesizer (1–7, 9–11), Mellotron (1–3, 5–7, 9–12), electric guitar (2–12); bass, acoustic guitar (2–7, 9–12); percussion (2–6, 8–12), pump organ (2, 7–10), backing vocals (3, 5, 6), lap steel guitar (3, 6, 7, 10, 11), mandolin (5, 7, 9, 10), drums (5, 7, 10, 11), piano (6, 7, 9, 10), clarinet (6, 7, 9, 12), electric piano (7)
- Jonathan Low – mixing
- Joe Lambert – mastering
- Billy Byrne – spoken word (1)
- Morgan Karabel – drums (2–4, 6, 7, 9, 11, 12), percussion (7)
- Jamie Deakin – drums (2, 7, 11)
- Dean Iead – pedal steel guitar (2, 4–6)
- Colm Conlan – piano (3, 5, 12), backing vocals (3), electric piano (8)
- Reid Jenkins – violin (3–5, 7, 8, 11)
- Cameron Neal – acoustic guitar, Mellotron, production (8)
- Jesse Noah Wilson – bass, production, engineering (8)
- Alberto Roubert – drums (8)
- Tori Tuller – backing vocals (8)
- Eilis Doherty – creative direction
- Kelly Ford – design
- Sarah Doyle – photography
- Erica Coburn – retouching, artwork creation
- Olivia McLaughlin – artwork production coordination

== Charts ==
Chart performance for Euro-Country
Chart (2025–2026)	Peak position
Australian Albums (ARIA)	55
Belgian Albums (Ultratop Flanders)	90
Irish Albums (Official Charts)	1
Irish Independent Albums (IRMA)	1
Scottish Albums (Official Charts)	2
UK Albums (Official Charts)	2
UK Americana Albums (Official Charts)	1
UK Independent Albums (Official Charts)	1

== Certifications ==
Certification for Euro-Country
Region	Certification	Certified units/sales
United Kingdom (BPI)	Silver	60,000^{‡}
^{‡} Sales+streaming figures based on certification alone.
