= Euro-Country (song) =

Single by CMAT

from the album Euro-Country
- Released: 22 July 2025
- Genre: Country pop
- Length: 4:56
- Label: CMATBaby; AWAL
- Songwriter: Ciara Mary-Alice Thompson
- Producers: Oli Deakin; CMAT

CMAT singles chronology
"The Jamie Oliver Petrol Station" (2025)	"Euro-Country" (2025)	"When a Good Man Cries" (2025)

Music video
- "Euro-Country" music video on YouTube

"Euro-Country" is a song by Irish singer-songwriter CMAT which was released on 22 July 2025 as the title track from her third studio album of the same name. It was written by CMAT, who co-produced the track with Oli Deakin. Lyrically, the song tells the story of the economic downturn that took place in CMAT's native Ireland following the post-2008 banking crisis. "Euro-Country" received acclaim from critics and peaked at number nine on the Irish Singles Chart, becoming the first top ten single of CMAT's career.

== Background ==
CMAT announced her third studio album, Euro-Country on 25 March 2025. She revealed the full track list a few days later on 31 March, with the title track featuring as the second song. The single was released on 22 July 2025.

The song's first broadcast on BBC Radio 1 generated controversy when the first 45 seconds, featuring the Irish-language spoken word introduction, was omitted. In response to backlash, the BBC denied purposefully censoring the introduction and released a statement that they played the copy of the track that had been provided by CMAT's record label AWAL. Following this, CMAT posted on her Instagram page that it was not her decision to have this edited out, and that the BBC had contacted her to advise that they would be playing the full version to make up for it. She added "I don't know who edited it out – that was crazy of them." In her post, she also highlighted that another line had been edited out, which she described as "more understandable" due to the mention of suicide.

== Composition and lyrics ==
The song begins with an Irish language introduction, and is a reflection on post-Celtic Tiger Ireland and CMAT's perspective on the fallout from the 2008 financial crash as a child living in a small town, and her feelings of being disconnected from her cultural identity, which mirrors Ireland's struggle to reconcile its past with its new identity as a consumerist, globalized "Euro-Country." The track includes references to Irish mythological hero Cú Chulainn, English singer and media personality Kerry Katona, and Bertie Ahern, Ireland's Taoiseach from 1997 to 2008. CMAT previously received media attention in 2023 for criticising Ahern and vowing to make it her "personal fucking mission to make sure that he doesn't win" had he chosen to run in the 2025 Irish presidential election.

In an interview discussing the financial crash and its influence on the song, CMAT stated "I was about 12 and it all happened around me, it didn't really happen to my family directly. My dad had a job in computers, we didn't really have any money, we weren't affluent, but we were fine. Everybody else on the estate we lived in worked in construction, or in shops, and they all lost their jobs. Everybody became unemployed. Then, in the village I grew up in, there was a year or 18 months where loads of the people I went to school with, their dads started killing themselves because they'd lost everything in the crash."

== Live performances ==
CMAT performed "Euro-Country" live for the first time at the All Together Now festival in Waterford on 2 August 2025, and it subsequently appeared as part of her set at the rest of her 2025 festival dates and in her Euro-Country tour. She also performed it and "Stay for Something" on Saturday Night Live UK on 13 September 2026.

== Music video ==
The official music video for the song premiered on 22 July 2025. It was directed by Eilis Doherty and begins with CMAT messily applying make-up in a mirror before dancing and singing the song in the Omni Park shopping centre in Dublin. Scenes of her dancing in the fountain towards the end of the video are a visual reference to the Euro-Country album cover.

== Critical reception ==
Writing for Far Out magazine, Lauren Hunter declared "Euro-Country" "the most important political song of our times" and stated that "unlike other songs with political forces steering the ship, the focus here is not about the high and mighty overlords leading the charge, but all the real people left behind to grapple with their own identities in the aftermath." She praised the honesty, imagery, "juxtaposing humour", and cultural references in the lyrics, feeling they were all integral to the song's message.

== Charts ==
Weekly chart performance for "Euro-Country"
Chart (2025)	Peak position
Ireland (IRMA)	9
UK Indie (Official Charts)	44
