= Stay for Something =

Single by CMAT

from the album Crazymad, for Me
- Released: 5 September 2023
- Genre: Power pop
- Length: 3:36
- Label: CMATBaby; AWAL
- Songwriters: Edward James Carlile; Benjamin Francis Leftwich; Ciara Mary-Alice Thompson
- Producer: Matias Tellez

CMAT singles chronology
"Where Are Your Kids Tonight?" (2023)	"Stay for Something" (2023)	"Aw, Shoot" (2024)

Music video
- "Stay for Something" music video on YouTube

"Stay for Something" is a song by Irish singer-songwriter CMAT which was released on 5 September 2023 as the fourth single from her second studio album, Crazymad, for Me. It was written by CMAT, Edward James Carlile, and Benjamin Francis Leftwich, and produced by Matias Tellez.

It was nominated for the Choice Music Prize for Song of the Year in 2023.

== Background ==
CMAT announced her second album, Crazymad, for Me, on 1 June 2023 and described it as "an abstract break-up album" about "what happens when you are still angry about something that happened 10 years ago", with "Stay for Something" featuring as the eleventh track.

The song was released on 5 September 2023 when it debuted as the Hottest Record in the World on Clara Amfo's BBC Radio 1 show.

== Writing and composition ==
"Stay for Something" is a power pop song with elements of country pop, jangle pop, and alternative rock featuring introspective lyrics that detail the post-mortem of an unsuccessful relationship. Of the song, CMAT explained, "it’s basically just about questioning why I stayed / suffered in a bad relationship for as long as I did. trying to desperately find some kind of meaning in the mess and then being embarrassed when I remember the good parts. It’s not very lyrical or poetic, it’s just a lot of emotion and energy – this song, to me, sounds like going for a run at 1am with your headphones on full blast, screaming through the streets in order to get away from your problems. I hope that at least one person does that when they hear it".

== Live performances ==
CMAT performed the song live on television for the first time on The Graham Norton Show on 4 November 2023. She also performed it and "Euro-Country" on Saturday Night Live UK on 13 September 2026.

== Music video ==
The video for the song was released on 5 September 2023 alongside the song itself. Directed by James Slater and filmed in Macclesfield, the "cinematic, period drama inspired" video features CMAT in an elaborate and colourful outfit fleeing from a stately home while singing and eventually ending up on a bus.

== Charts ==
Weekly chart performance for "Stay for Something"
Chart (2023-2025)	Peak position
Ireland (IRMA)	67
UK Singles Downloads (OCC)	39
