= When a Good Man Cries =

Single by CMAT

from the album Euro-Country
- Released: 28 August 2025
- Genre: Country
- Length: 4:32
- Label: CMATBaby; AWAL
- Songwriter: Ciara Mary-Alice Thompson
- Producers: Oli Deakin; CMAT

CMAT singles chronology
"Euro-Country" (2025)	"When a Good Man Cries" (2025)

Music video
- "When a Good Man Cries" music video on YouTube

"When a Good Man Cries" is a song by Irish singer-songwriter CMAT which was released on 28 August 2025 as the fifth single from her third studio album, Euro-Country. It was written by CMAT, who co-produced the track with Oli Deakin. The song centres on themes of reflection, remorse, and redemption as the narrator struggles with wanting to change her behaviour towards her lovers.

== Background ==
CMAT announced her third studio album, Euro-Country on 25 March 2025. She revealed the full track list a few days later on 31 March, with "When a Good Man Cries" featuring as the third song.

The song immediately follows on from the title track, with CMAT explaining that this was done intentionally in order to convey the makeup of the album. Speaking to Apple Music, she explained “I’m really glad the way those two songs run into each other. That’s one of the most successful bits of the album. I needed to go full country immediately, so everyone knew what the record was.”

== Lyrics and composition ==
"When a Good Man Cries" is a country song featuring prominent fiddle, drums, and bass. Of the idea behind the lyrics, CMAT stated “this is me going in on myself because I made an ex-partner cry. He hadn’t done anything wrong. There’s this thing in third-wave feminism, which is, I feel, now outdated, where women should be like men. Making a man cry is turning a trope on its head. I repeat ‘Kyrie Eleison’ [‘Lord have mercy’] over and over again at the end, which is a reference to my favourite song of all time, ‘The Donor’ by Judee Sill, in which she's begging God for another chance to become a good person.”

During the song, CMAT refers to herself as "the people's mess, Dunboyne Diana" and which is a play on the phrase "the people's princess", a common descriptor of Diana, Princess of Wales, whom CMAT has mentioned in several songs on Euro-Country. She also references Veruca Salt from Roald Dahl's 1964 novel Charlie and the Chocolate Factory, and the title character from Oscar Wilde's 1890 novel The Picture of Dorian Gray.

== Live performances ==
CMAT performed "When a Good Man Cries" live for the first time at the Green Man Festival on 16 August 2025 at Brecon Beacons National Park in Wales.

In June 2026, Olivia Rodrigo covered the song as part of a set for BBC Radio 1's Live Lounge.

== Music video ==
The official music video for the song premiered on 28 August 2025. Directed by Eilís Doherty, it shows CMAT and her band performing the song in a car park and a field, with additional scenes of her riding around in a red car while singing. In the video, CMAT wears a t-shirt with the phrase "Suckin' Diesel", an Irish slang term meaning that things are going as planned, and a dress featuring the face of Irish country singer Daniel O'Donnell. A lyric video had previously been released on 4 September 2025.

== Charts ==
Weekly chart performance for "When a Good Man Cries"
Chart (2025)	Peak position
Ireland (IRMA)	23
UK Singles (Official Charts)	92
UK Indie (Official Charts)	29
