= The Jamie Oliver Petrol Station =

Single by CMAT

from the album Euro-Country
- Released: 19 June 2025
- Genre: Krautrock
- Length: 5:23
- Label: CMATBaby; AWAL
- Songwriter: Ciara Mary-Alice Thompson
- Producers: Oli Deakin; CMAT

CMAT singles chronology
"Take a Sexy Picture of Me" (2025)	"The Jamie Oliver Petrol Station" (2025)	"Euro-Country" (2025)

Music video
- "The Jamie Oliver Petrol Station" music video on YouTube

"The Jamie Oliver Petrol Station" is a song by Irish singer-songwriter CMAT which was released on 19 June 2025 as the third single from her third studio album Euro-Country. It was written by CMAT, who co-produced the track with Oli Deakin. It is named after and references British chef Jamie Oliver and lyrically explores themes of misplaced anger and reflects on the futility of hatred.

== Background ==
CMAT announced her third studio album, Euro-Country on 25 March 2025. She revealed the full track list a few days later on 31 March, with "The Jamie Oliver Petrol Station" featuring as the third song. The single was released on 19 June 2025.

Oliver explained that, when he first heard the song, he didn't really understand what it was about and wondered what he had done wrong to anger CMAT, but noted that his daughters and their friends all loved it. Oliver later stated that, "we all live in a world where we make assumptions without understanding the whole picture," and joked that he hopes "[CMAT] finds me less annoying now".

== Lyrics and composition ==
"The Jamie Oliver Petrol Station" is an indie rock and krautrock song with elements of alternative pop. Of the song, CMAT stated, "the whole point of the song is actually my annoyance and intolerance and hatred of other people serves absolutely no purpose in my life and is a really bad instinct that I have. So it’s actually a love song for Jamie Oliver, if you think about it. It’s me being like ‘don’t be a bitch and stop judging people for annoyances". She further explained, "it’s a fun song because it’s going after Jamie Oliver –which is just quite a funny thing to say. Then there’s a sing-alongy bit –“OK / Don’t be bitch.” But ultimately, it is about how I dislike myself and the world around me and how I’m always trying to fight back against the most hateful parts of myself. And weirdly, the abstract nature of it and the stream of consciousness seems to be more relatable to people. I know it sounds like I’m hating Jamie Oliver, but I promise I don’t."

== Music video ==
The official video for the song was released on 14 March 2026. Directed by Eilís Doherty, it features CMAT and her band performing the song in a retro-style television studio interspersed with clips of Oliver experiencing a stressful day in the kitchen. After seeing the performance on TV, Oliver heads to a diner where he fantasises about playing drums with the band. CMAT explained that Oliver began following her on Instagram in February 2026, which also happened to be her 30th birthday, and she decided to ask him if he wanted to take part in the video, which they filmed two days later. Oliver stated, "I’ve got massive respect for the creative arts and music, and I know how hard it is now more than ever. When CMAT asked me to be in the video, I was 100% in." The shoot took place in the weeks before Oliver's restaurant opened in Leicester Square which added a chaotic element to production, with Oliver explaining, "furniture was still arriving, we hadn’t finished decorating … My team thought I was completely mad, but they loved it," and that he enjoyed spending time with CMAT and her crew. CMAT also spoke positively of working with Oliver and noted that his people were "lovely" and "very kindly fed us after we were done."

Doherty was inspired by 1970's TV shows like The Brady Bunch and The Cher Show and enjoyed the challenge of contrasting the stylised camp moments of the band performing the song with the more chaotic moments of Oliver in the restaurant. She stated that she attempted to elicit a "stereotypical fiery TV chef" performance from Oliver akin to Jeremy Allen White's performance as Carmy Berzatto in The Bear but that Oliver struggles to appear angry on-screen. Of this, she joked, "I genuinely don't think he gets mad at his staff because he just couldn't do it". Of filming the video amidst preparations for Oliver's restaurant reopening, Doherty said, "I don't think I was ever on a set that had so many other people walking around that weren't involved in the film making, like they were training in the kitchen or setting up furniture and decorating the space for the opening. Chefs were walking around and I was giving out to them for being in our shots and they were being like, 'who are you?'". Discussing Oliver's participation, Doherty expressed, "it's like a beautiful moment that this song, like dissing this guy, but not really dissing. For him to then come into the video and give everything, I think that really stays with people".

== Charts ==
Weekly chart performance for "The Jamie Oliver Petrol Station"
Chart (2025)	Peak position
Ireland (IRMA)	43
