= I Don't Really Care for You =

Single by CMAT

from the album Diet Baby & If My Wife New I'd Be Dead
- Released: 23 February 2021
- Genre: Indie pop; country pop
- Length: 4:04
- Label: CMATBaby; AWAL
- Songwriter: Ciara Mary-Alice Thompson
- Producer: Oli Deakin

CMAT singles chronology
"Uncomfortable Christmas" (2020)	"I Don't Really Care for You" (2021)	"2 Wrecked 2 Care" (2021)

Music video
- "I Don't Really Care for You" music video on YouTube

"I Don't Really Care for You" is a song by Irish singer-songwriter CMAT. It was released on 23 February 2021 as the fourth and final single from her extended play Diet Baby. It was also included on her debut studio album If My Wife New I'd Be Dead.

It was written by CMAT and produced Oli Deakin. Lyrically, the song is a reflection on a past relationship and accepting the blame for your own part in the breakup, the track is sonically inspired by Swedish pop group ABBA and American country music singer Charley Pride. The track has the lyrics "Oh, the Marian Keyes of it all", referring to the Irish novelist. The track became CMAT's first to appear on the Irish Singles Chart.

== Background ==
About the song, CMAT explained, "It's about realising you were ultimately the bigger dickhead in a relationship. I was thinking about how superiority always insists upon itself. Good people will always think they were doing the right thing in the moment, even if their actions are terrible. I try really hard to be a good person, but I still end up being a big bully sometimes. If you ever find yourself saying something along the lines of, 'I would love him IF…' or 'I would stay with you IF…' then... you're probably being a dickhead. Musically, I went to my producer Oli with the vague concept of, 'What if this song was ABBA doing a spaghetti western soundtrack?' and he just knocked it out of the park. I was also listening to loads of Charley Pride around that time – and the backing vocals in the pre-chorus are directly inspired by him. Rest In peace king!"

== Music video ==
The video for the song premiered on 25 March 2021 and was directed by Eilís Doherty. In the video, CMAT sits across from a former lover in a diner, who appears largely uninterested and reads a newspaper in front of her face. She stands up and dances around the table before writing her name in lipstick on the bathroom mirror. On the tv, CMAT imagines a dream sequence where the couple, wearing a white suit and dress respectively, dance together. Now alone in the diner, continues to dance, briefly on a stage, before appearing back at the table.

Discussing the concept, CMAT stated "The director Eilís approached me some time ago to make a music video, and I really wanted it to be for 'I Don't Really Care for You' because I knew she would be able to capture the high energy mood of the song, and also we are into the same old, niche and ugly design stuff. Visual references for this video range anywhere from the film Five Easy Pieces, to a BTS music video, and the dream sequence was inspired by a Nestlé ad from the 1980s. The choreographer, Nick, made my dreams come true. I was like, "'I want to dance like Blackpink, but I have absolutely no technical ability whatsoever.' I think that much is evident in the video but we pulled it off!"

== Charts ==
Chart performance for "I Don't Really Care for You"
Chart (2025)	Peak position
Ireland (IRMA)	34
UK Physical Singles Chart (OCC)	33
UK Vinyl Singles Chart (OCC)	30
