= Nissan Ireland =

Automotive company

Nissan Ireland Ltd.
- Company type: Subsidiary
- Industry: Automotive
- Founded: 2 February 1977; 49 years ago
- Headquarters: Dublin, Ireland
- Products: Automobiles
- Parent: Nissan
- Website: www.nissan.ie

Nissan Ireland Ltd. is the Irish subsidiary of Nissan Motor Company of Japan. With an assembly plant for motor vehicles, it was part of the automotive industry in Ireland.

== Company history ==
The company was founded in Dublin on 2 February 1977. This was preceded by a relationship between TMG and Al Babtain Trading and Construction, one of nine companies in the Al Babtain Group from Kuwait. TMG stood for the Irish Tom McLoughlin Group. The company continued the assembly of automobiles, which was previously done by the Brittain Group. The parts came from Nissan. The vehicles were marketed as Datsun. In 1984 production ended. The company is still active as an import and sales company for Nissan.

== Vehicles ==
The only Nissan model that had been produced in Ireland was the Nissan Sunny.
