= Women of Honour =

2021 audio documentary

Women of Honour is a 2021 audio documentary that describes a culture of misogyny and sexual assault in the Irish Defence Forces. Reported by Irish broadcaster Katie Hannon, the documentary was named for an informal group of current and former serving members of the army, naval service and air corps who had been victims of sexual assault while on service.

== Documentary ==
Women of Honour was released on RTÉ Radio One on 23 October 2021, as special episode of Saturday with Katie Hannon. In the documentary, Hannon investigated the treatment of misogyny, sexual assault, and rape allegations in the Irish Defense Forces. The survivors formed a representative group of the same name.

== Official investigation ==
An official investigation was ordered by the Minister for Defence Simon Coveney in January 2022. The final report, published in March 2023, made 13 recommendations which the government accepted in full.

== Calls for statutory investigation ==
Following the release of the report from the official investigation, the Women of Honour group called for a statutory investigation.

The tribunal of inquiry began holding sessions in June 2024.
