= CMAT =

Irish musician

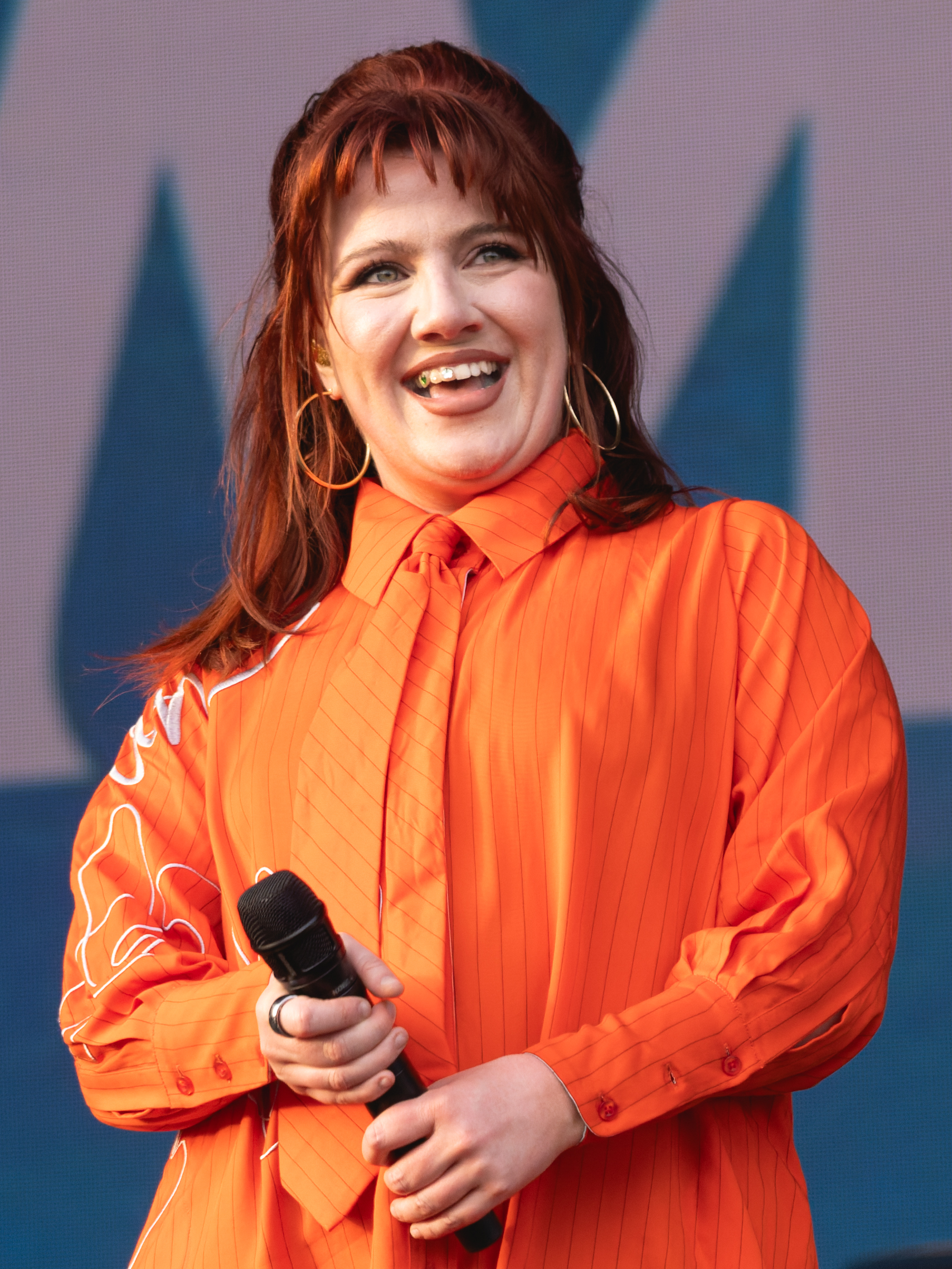
- CMAT performing in 2025

Background information
- Born: Ciara Mary-Alice Thompson; 23 February 1996 (age 30); Dublin, Ireland
- Origin: Dunboyne, County Meath, Ireland
- Genres: Indie pop; country pop
- Occupations: Musician; singer; songwriter
- Instruments: Vocals; guitar
- Years active: 2017–present
- Labels: CMATBaby; AWAL
- Website: cmatbaby.com

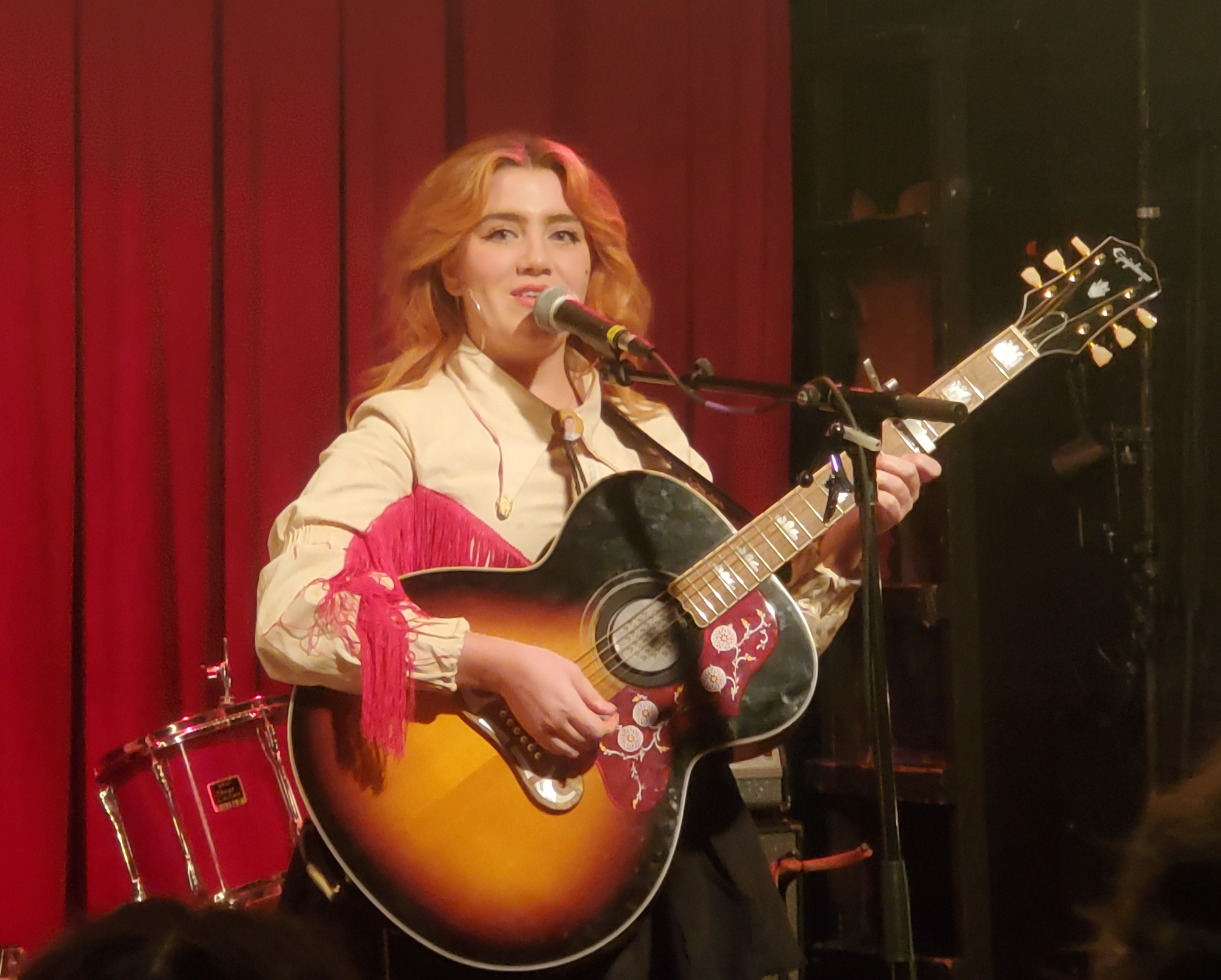
CMAT in 2022

Ciara Mary-Alice Thompson (born 23 February 1996), known professionally as CMAT (/ˈsiːmæt/, SEE-mat), is an Irish musician. She has released three studio albums, If My Wife New I'd Be Dead (2022), Crazymad, for Me (2023) and Euro-Country (2025). Her music has been described by Kate Hutchinson of The Guardian as "songs [that] are mournful yet accessible, emotionally literate and cleverly crafted, but, crucially, with a huge sense of humour".

During live performances, CMAT is joined by "The Very Sexy CMAT Band", which consists of Holly Carpenter (violin, backing vocals), Jack Wolter (guitar, backing vocals), William Bishop (bass), Colm Conlan (keyboards, backing vocals), Daniel Vildósola (pedal steel, guitar) and Hannah Morgan (drums).

== Early life ==
Ciara Mary-Alice Thompson was born on 23 February 1996 in Dublin. When she was 3 years old, she and her family moved to Clonee. When she was 12 years old, they moved to Dunboyne, a town of 5,000 residents in County Meath. Her mother, Sinead Lanigan, is a nurse. She has 3 siblings: a sister and brother who are nurses, and another sister who is a teacher. Her father works in computers.

From a young age, CMAT aspired to be a professional musician; however, her family viewed it as impractical, preferring that she pursue a stable career. CMAT said that until age 12, her "life was structured around the Catholic Church". She hated going to Mass, which she found boring, but began to enjoy it when she was added as a member of the choir. She listened to Dolly Parton as a child. Her grandfather introduced her to the music of Skepta, while her mother introduced her to the work of Boney M., Gerry Ryan, The Beautiful South, and Mary Black. When she was 10 years old, she became obsessed with The Beatles. After seeing Taylor Swift on The Paul O'Grady Show and Emma Roberts in Unfabulous, she was inspired to learn guitar and begin songwriting. She wrote her first song at age 12, although she was embarrassed by her early creations.

CMAT attended St. Peter's College, Dunboyne, a secondary school. As a teenager, she had low self-esteem and spent most of her time in her bedroom. She enjoyed watching reruns of The Old Grey Whistle Test and was an avid Tumblr user. When she was 15, she often snuck into gay clubs; she said they were the "first place where I felt I was ever accepted for being the exact person I am". In her mid-teens, prompted by a music teacher, CMAT became musically influenced by the Villagers, Dory Previn, and Kate & Anna McGarrigle. After secondary school, she moved with her family to Copenhagen. At age 17, she performed a mashup of "Couleur cafe" by Serge Gainsbourg and "Mama Look at Bubu" by Harry Belafonte for her university entrance exam. She returned to Dublin at age 18 to study at Trinity College Dublin. At that time, she said she wanted to be a pop star like Ariana Grande. At the advice of her tutor, she dropped out due to her severe physical and mental health struggle and moved to Denmark for three months to attend a songwriting camp.

== Career ==
=== 2016–2021: Early career ===
In 2016, she formed a band, Bad Sea, with her boyfriend, Alan Farrell, whom she met on Tinder. The band played at the Hard Working Class Heroes Festival and the Other Voices Music Trail. In the autumn of 2017, she relocated to Chorlton-cum-Hardy, near Manchester, to pursue a career in music; it was cheaper than moving to London. Her manager, Jamie MacColl of Bombay Bicycle Club, and her boyfriend dismissed most of her songs, including "Another Day (KFC)", as "being too comedic or unserious". While living in Manchester, she worked at TK Maxx and a nightclub and frequently took the bus to London for music events. She later said that her five-year relationship with her boyfriend was toxic, filled with infidelity and further isolation from friends and family. She then turned to alcohol to cope and gained weight. This led her to quit being a musician because she felt that she "couldn't be chubby and a woman and play the guitar".

In 2018, she attended a Spotify listening session in London where she met Charli XCX. She provided specific feedback to Charli XCX on her new unreleased songs and Charli provided her feedback to reimagine her approach. On the Megabus back to Manchester, with no money and no friends, CMAT made the decision to break up with her boyfriend and move back to her mother's house in Dublin. After breaking up with her boyfriend, alone in her flat crying, at age 22, she wrote "I Wanna Be a Cowboy, Baby!", her breakthrough song, in 20 minutes. She moved from Manchester to Dublin in December 2018. In Dublin, she rented space in a yoga studio after-hours to write and record.

In November 2019, CMAT recorded 5 songs in New York, including "Rodney", a song about Rodney Dangerfield. She noted that she was lucky with the timing as the recordings were done just before the COVID-19 pandemic. In April 2020, during the COVID-19 pandemic, she self-released "Another Day (KFC)". She posted acoustic recordings to YouTube once a week for 6 months. One of her viewers became her new talent manager, who convinced her to remain a solo artist. She gained considerable attention, including radio play from RTÉ Radio 1 and BBC Radio 6 Music. In October 2021, she signed a recording contract with AWAL.

=== 2022–2024: If My Wife New I'd Be Dead and Crazymad, for Me ===
CMAT's debut studio album If My Wife New I'd Be Dead was released in February 2022. Metacritic gives the album a score of 85 based on 9 reviews, indicating "universal acclaim". The album entered the Irish Albums Chart at number one. In June 2022, she released a single called "Peter Bogdanovich", named after director Peter Bogdanovich; in the music video, she dressed as Bogdanovich. In August 2022, the single charted at number 20 on the Irish Homegrown Top 20. In March 2023, If My Wife New I'd Be Dead won the Choice Music Prize for Irish Album of the Year.

Her next studio album, Crazymad, for Me, was released in October 2023. Like her previous album, this album debuted at number one on the Irish Albums Chart. In May 2024, the album was nominated for the Best Album at the Ivor Novello Awards. Also in May 2024, a video posted by the BBC on Instagram of CMAT's performance at Radio 1's Big Weekend festival, which showed CMAT removing her shirt to reveal a tighter outfit beneath, received many comments described as "fat-shaming"; BBC then disabled comments on the post.

CMAT provided vocals on the track "I Like Your Look" by Blossoms on their fifth studio album Gary, released in September 2024.

=== 2025–present: Euro-Country ===
In March 2025, CMAT released "Running/Planning", the first single of her next album, Euro-Country. In May 2025, "Take a Sexy Picture of Me" was released. The song, which is a rejection of the criticism CMAT has received about her physical appearance, went viral online. CMAT performed "Running/Planning" and "Take a Sexy Picture of Me" on the first episode of the 66th series of Later... with Jools Holland on 18 May 2025. She performed on the Pyramid stage at Glastonbury Festival 2025, earning positive reviews.

The title track for the next album was released in July 2025. It received media attention and praise for its portrayal of ordinary people's struggles after the 2008 financial crisis, specially in Ireland's post Celtic Tiger period. Her third studio album Euro-Country was released in August 2025. She describes the album as the "type of loss, pain and lack of community that I feel we are suffering from under modern capital isolation". Like her previous two albums, Euro-Country debuted at number one on the Irish Albums Chart. It debuted at number two in the UK.

In December 2025, she extended her recording contract with AWAL.

== Political views and activism ==
CMAT spoke out against fascism at the Brit Awards 2026, saying that fascism was on the rise in the UK, Ireland, and the United States. Previously, in 2023, she stated that Ireland was "infiltrated" by a "Neo-Capitalist snake". Upon the release of Euro-Country (2025), she said that "Ireland is a European country run by the euro" and that "capitalism is one of the worst things to ever happen to us." She blamed the high cost of living in Ireland for the increased emigration from Ireland. In 2023, CMAT said she would fiercely oppose Fianna Fáil politician Bertie Ahern, who was the Taoiseach from 1997 to 2008, if he ran for President of Ireland in the 2025 elections in the Republic of Ireland. CMAT's single, "Euro-Country" (2025), references Ahern with the lyrics "All the big boys, all the Berties, all the envelopes, yeah, they hurt me..." and "I was 12 when the das started killing themselves all around me." CMAT stated that, as an Irish person, her relationship with England will always be "complicated" and that she moved there only because it is necessary to further her music career; her goal is to move back to Dublin.

CMAT supports Palestinian sovereignty and has led the crowd at many of her shows in chants of "Free, free Palestine", or, at shows in the United States, "ICE Out, free Palestine". These include the 2025 Glastonbury Festival, Coachella 2026, and All Together Now. She has stated that it's important to "get that slogan ['free Palestine'] correct" to avoid what may be considered "as hate speech". In May 2024, CMAT said she would not perform at Latitude Festival due to the festival's sponsorship by Barclays, which allegedly "increased their financing of various companies who are supplying weapons and military technology to Israel". In June 2024, she rejoined the lineup after Barclays was dropped as the main sponsor. CMAT additionally supports trans rights and opposes TERFism, which she noted came to Ireland from the United Kingdom. In October 2025, she criticized Róisín Murphy after Murphy posted that a spike in the identification of young people as trans or non-binary reflected "absolute havoc wreaked on children, families and society".

In March 2026, CMAT criticised the 2026 Berlin International Film Festival and Wim Wenders, who said that cinema should "stay out of politics", calling it "cowardice".

== Personal life ==
CMAT is bisexual. She had her first "lesbian experience" at a Little Comets concert at Koko in Camden Town. CMAT has been noted for her large fanbase among Irish LGBTQ+ people. She once said: "I'm making music for the girls and the gays, and that's it." She was described as a "bisexual icon" by Charlie Duncan of PinkNews.

CMAT lives in Hackney, London, with a roommate, Mia, and a pit bull named Paris.

== Backing band ==
Current members

- Holly Carpenter – violin, backing vocals
- Jack Wolter – guitar, backing vocals
- William Bishop – bass guitar
- Colm Conlan – keyboards, backing vocals
- Daniel Vildósola – pedal steel, guitar
- Hannah Morgan – drums

Former members

- Josh McClorey – guitar (2021–2023)
- Henry Pearce – bass guitar (2021–2023)

== Discography ==
=== Studio albums ===
List of studio albums, with selected details and chart positions
Title	Details	Peak chart positions					Certifications
Title	Details	IRE	AUS	BEL (FL)	SCO	UK	Certifications
If My Wife New I'd Be Dead	Released: 25 February 2022; Label: CMATBaby / AWAL; Formats: CD, cassette, digital download, streaming, vinyl	1	—	—	—	—	
Crazymad, for Me	Released: 13 October 2023; Label: CMATBaby / AWAL; Formats: CD, cassette, digital download, streaming, vinyl	1	—	—	14	25	
Euro-Country	Released: 29 August 2025; Label: CMATBaby / AWAL; Formats: CD, cassette, digital download, streaming, vinyl	1	55	90	2	2	BPI: Silver
"—" denotes album did not chart in that territory.

=== Extended plays ===
List of EPs, with selected details
Title	Details
Diet Baby	Released: March 2021 (Ireland) April 2026 (RSD 2026); Format: 12" LP; Label: Diet Baby (DBEP001)

=== Singles ===
List of singles as lead artist, with select chart positions, showing year released and album name
Title	Year	Peak chart positions			Album
Title	Year	IRE	EST Air.	UK	Album
"Another Day (KFC)"	2020	—	—	—	Diet Baby
"Rodney"	2020	—	—	—	Diet Baby
"I Wanna Be a Cowboy, Baby!"	2020	—	—	— (Note: "I Wanna Be a Cowboy, Baby!" did not enter the UK Singles Chart, but peaked at number 9 on the UK Singles Sales Chart.)	Diet Baby
"Uncomfortable Christmas"	2020	—	—	—	Non-album single
"I Don't Really Care for You"	2021	34	—	—	Diet Baby
"2 Wrecked 2 Care"	2021	—	—	—	If My Wife New I'd Be Dead
"No More Virgos"	2021	—	—	—	If My Wife New I'd Be Dead
"Lonely"	2022	—	—	—	If My Wife New I'd Be Dead
"Every Bottle (Is My Boyfriend)"	2022	—	—	—	If My Wife New I'd Be Dead
"Mayday"	2023	—	—	—	Non-album single
"Whatever's Inconvenient"	2023	—	—	—	Crazymad, for Me
"Have Fun!"	2023	—	—	—	Crazymad, for Me
"Where Are Your Kids Tonight?" (featuring John Grant)	2023	—	—	—	Crazymad, for Me
"Stay for Something"	2023	67	—	— (Note: "Stay for Something" did not enter the UK Singles Chart, but peaked at number 39 on the UK Singles Downloads Chart.)	Crazymad, for Me
"Aw, Shoot!"	2024	—	—	—	Non-album single
"Running/Planning"	2025	66	—	—	Euro-Country
"Take a Sexy Picture of Me"	2025	22	60	42	Euro-Country
"The Jamie Oliver Petrol Station"	2025	43	—	—	Euro-Country
"Euro-Country"	2025	9	—	— (Note: "Euro-Country" did not enter the UK Singles Chart, but peaked at number 44 on the UK Independent Singles Chart.)	Euro-Country
"When a Good Man Cries"	2025	23	—	92	Euro-Country
"Step into Christmas" (with Elton John)	2026	—	—	37	Non-album single
"—" denotes recording that did not chart in that territory. "*" denotes that the chart did not exist at that time.

== Awards and nominations ==
Award	Year	Nominated work	Award	Result	Ref.
Choice Music Prize	2022	If My Wife New I'd Be Dead	Album of the Year	Won	
Choice Music Prize	2023	Crazymad, For Me	Album of the Year	Nominated	
Choice Music Prize	2023	Stay for Something	Song of the Year	Nominated	
Choice Music Prize	2023	Herself	Artist of the Year	Nominated	
BBC Sound of...	2023	Herself	Sound of 2024	Nominated	
Brit Awards	2024	Herself	International Artist of the Year	Nominated	
Ivor Novello Award	2024	Crazymad, For Me	Best Album	Nominated	
Mercury Prize	2024	Crazymad, For Me	Album of the Year	Nominated	
Mercury Prize	2025	Euro-Country	Album of the Year	Nominated	
Choice Music Prize	2025	Euro-Country	Album of the Year	Won	
Choice Music Prize	2025	Take a Sexy Picture of Me	Song of the Year	Nominated	
Choice Music Prize	2025	Herself	Artist of the Year	Won	
Brit Awards	2026	Herself	International Artist of the Year	Nominated	
Ivor Novello Award	2026	Euro-Country	Best Album	Won	
