= Mental health in Ireland =

Mental health in the Republic of Ireland is the subject of state and community sector intervention in Ireland. The Irish state devolves responsibility for mental health to the Department of Health. Community groups and charities also provide support in the prevention and management of mental illness as well as suicide prevention.

== History ==
The first psychiatric hospital built in Ireland, and one of the first in the world, was St Patrick's Hospital which was founded in 1746. The hospital was founded with money bequeathed by the author Jonathan Swift following his death in 1745. By 1808, there was only one asylum in the country and before a Committee of the House of Commons in 1817, it was stated that the Limerick Asylum was in such poor condition that it would not have suited dog kennels. Attempts to address this resulted in the Lunacy (Ireland) Act 1821, which authorised the creation of a publicly funded, nationwide network of district lunatic asylums across Ireland.

== Government strategy ==
As of 2022, the Minister of State at the Department of Health with responsibility for Mental Health and Older People is Mary Butler, TD. Health services are delivered by the Health Service Executive (HSE).

=== National Suicide Research Foundation ===
The National Suicide Research Foundation leads research on the topic of suicidology.

== Non-governmental organisations ==
A number of non-governmental organizations have historically been involved in delivery of health and educational services, including by religious orders and congregations. The impact of mental health services has been highlighted by research and media reports in recent decades, and a number of organisations have been created to deal with the area.

=== Amen ===
Amen (amen.ie) is a charity based in Navan, County Meath, which works with male victims of domestic violence. It dealt with over 3,600 contacts in 2009. The organisation was awarded a People of the Year Award and a GSK Ireland IMPACT Award in 2016.

=== AsIAm ===
AsIAm is an organisation that advocates for and supports people on the autism spectrum. It was founded in 2014 by Adam Harris, brother of Simon Harris.

=== Aware ===
Aware is the national charity and voluntary organisation providing support, therapy, education and information to those affected by depression, bipolar and anxiety. They provide free accessible support to tens of thousands of people across Ireland each year. It was founded in 1985 by a group of patients, relatives and health professionals.

=== Console ===
Console was a charity that offered suicide bereavement services including a 24/7 Suicide Helpline, Suicide Bereavement Liaison Service and a Suicide Bereavement Counselling Service. Its founder, Paul Kelly, received a People of the Year Awards, award in 2014. Reports emerged in 2016 that the charity was mismanaged and the charity closed. Campaigner David Hall was appointed interim CEO during the winding-down process. A national Charities Regulator was appointed in the same year.

Paul Kelly took his own life due to impending criminal charges. His wife Patricia Kelly pleaded guilty to "failing to keep the books of account as a director of the company" for which she was fined €1,500.

=== Cycle Against Suicide ===
Cycle Against Suicide is an organisation that seeks to raise awareness and bring support to those dealing with mental health issues. A compilation album Simple Things was released in 2013 for the charity.

=== Men's sheds ===
The Irish Association of Men's Sheds is a non-profit organization which promotes good mental health through creating sheds for men to meet and create projects in. Projects, as varied as woodwork, electronics and jam-making, are chosen by the participants. The organisation was awarded a People of the Year Award. More than 10,000 men use over 300 sheds.

=== Nightline ===
Nightline is the name given to various confidential and anonymous overnight listening, emotional support, information, and supplies services, run by students for students at universities around the world. Individual Nightlines are autonomous organisations, but are affiliated to the Nightline Association, which is an umbrella organisation founded to facilitate cooperation between Nightlines in the UK and Ireland.

=== Pieta House ===
Pieta House deals with suicide prevention and counselling for those bereaved by suicide. The annual Darkness into Light event at locations across Ireland and the world act as a fundraiser for the charity.

=== Other organisations ===
The Brothers Hospitallers of Saint John of God have run institutions in Ireland since 1882. The Samaritans charity also runs a helpline for suicide prevention. SOSAD ("Save Our Sons And Daughters") Ireland is a suicide prevention and bereavement agency which was set up in 2006. International organisations such as Narcotics Anonymous and Alcoholics Anonymous operate in Ireland. The Rutland Centre, founded by recovering alcoholic Mary Bolton treats addicts of gambling, narcotics and alcohol.

== Youth mental health ==
In Ireland, state healthcare for young people is accessed through Child and Adolescent Mental Health Services (CAMHS). Funded by the Health Service Executive (HSE), CAMHS provides mental health care for people under the age of 18, specifically those whose difficulties have a significant impact on their daily lives. The service treats mental issues such as anxiety, eating disorders and depression.

The Child and Youth Mental Health Office (CYMHO) is a national body that was established in 2023 to provide governance and oversight of all youth mental health services in Ireland.

=== Charities & NGOs ===
For those experiencing grief due to bereavement, parental separation or family breakdown, counselling services are available with Barnardo's while peer support groups are available through Rainbows Ireland. Helplines and chat services include Childline by the ISPCC for under-18s and Text About It by SpunOut, a non-governmental organisation (NGO) that targets 16 to 25 year olds.

Jigsaw is the National Centre for Youth Mental Health. ReachOut.com deals with young people aged 12 to 25. Childline runs a helpline and online chat service for those under 18. BodyWhys offers online support centring on eating disorder issues. Children at Risk In Ireland (CARI) is an organisation that primarily provides therapy and counselling to victims of child sexual abuse.

== Mental health among males ==
At this current time in Ireland, there is a push to nullify the stigma towards mental health and raise awareness of the widespread epidemic of mental health issues among males (over four in five suicides in Ireland are male)

== See also ==
- Healthcare in the Republic of Ireland
- Mental Health Commission (Ireland)
- Suicide in Ireland
