= Health in the Republic of Ireland =

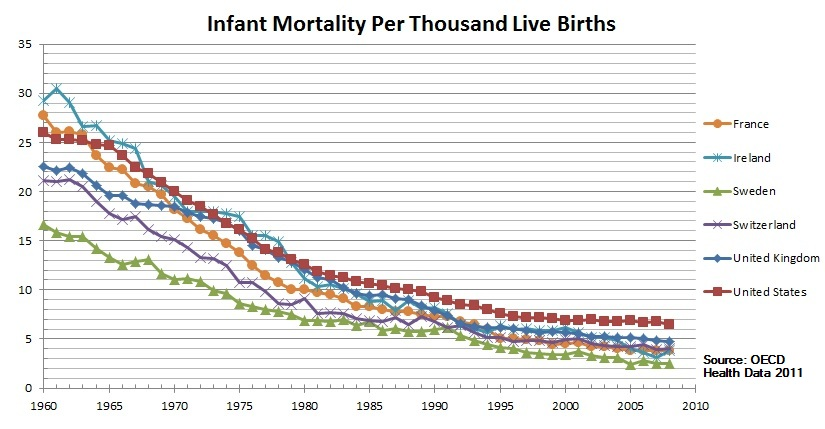
The reduction in infant mortality between 1960 and 2008 for Ireland in comparison with France, Switzerland, Sweden, the United Kingdom, and the United States.

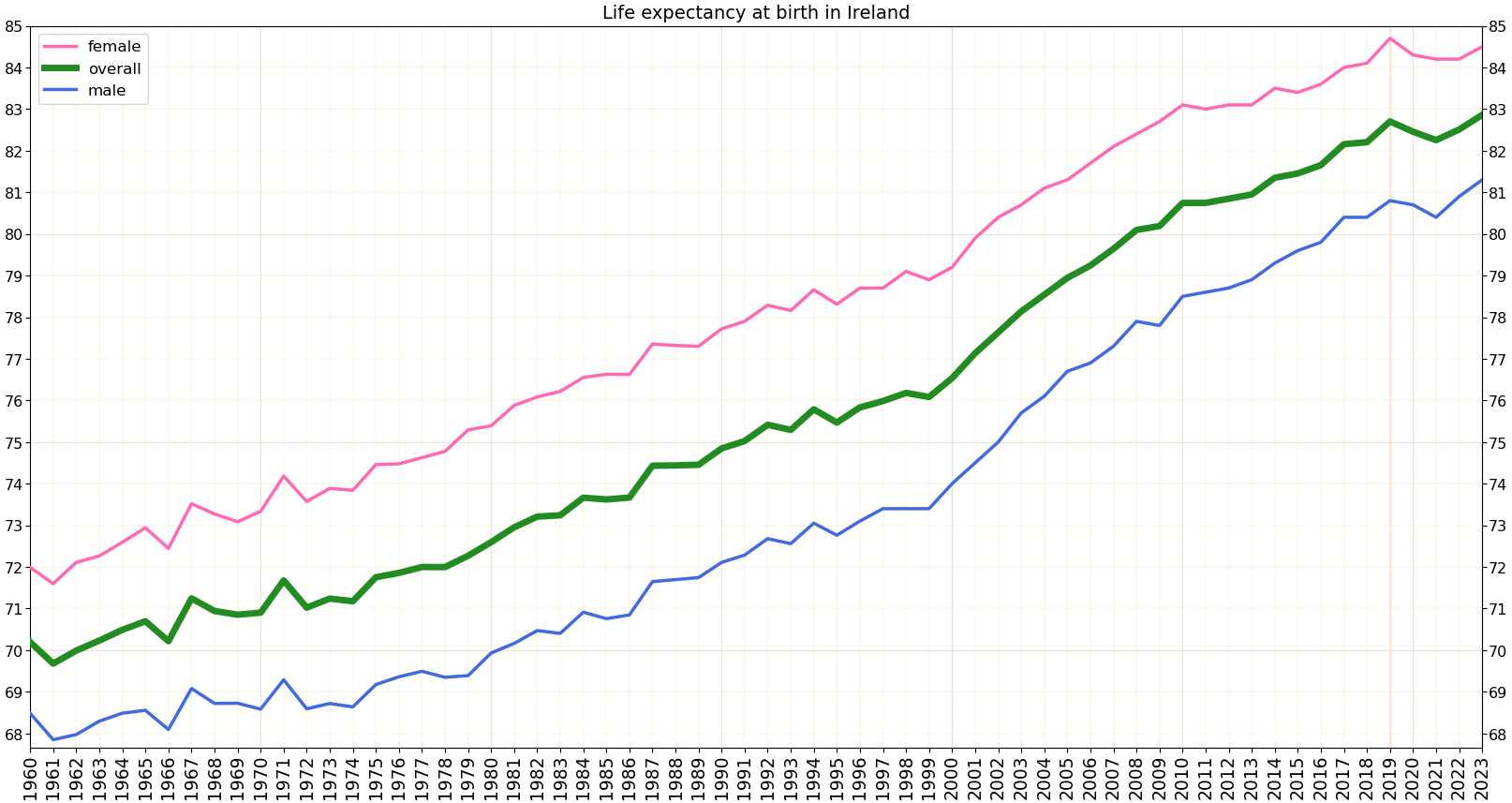
Life expectancy at birth in Ireland

Smoking, alcohol consumption and obesity in Ireland occur at rates higher than the OECD average. Life expectancy in the Republic of Ireland was 81.1 years for males at birth and 84.6 for females in 2025, considerably better than in Northern Ireland where the figures were 78.8 and 82.6 years.

A 2011 press release from the Department of Health indicated significant reductions in mortality from the three principal causes of death in Ireland: heart disease, cancer and stroke. The press release indicated that age-standardised mortality rate for heart disease had fallen by 59% between 1990 and 2011 and, as of 2011, stood just above the OECD rate at 136 deaths per 100,000 population per annum. Similarly, the age-standardised mortality rate for stroke had fallen by 51% in the same period to below the OECD average (61 deaths from stroke per 100,000 population per annum). Deaths from cancer fell by 21% between 1990 and 2011 to 217 per 100,000.

In 2005:

- 47.6% of Ireland's population were covered by private health insurance, and 31.9% of the population were covered by medical cards.
- 23.8% of the population over 16 had a "chronic illness or health problem".
- 19.6% of the population over 16 had "limited activity", of which 6.6% were "strongly limited" and 13.0% were "limited".
- 47.2% of the population over 16 described their health as "very good", 35.7% as "good", 13.5% as "fair" and only 3.6% as "bad" or "very bad".
- 24.9% of the population over 16 were classed as smokers.
- There were 53 publicly funded acute hospitals, with a total of 12,094 in-patient beds available and 1,253-day beds available.

A measure of expected human capital was published by The Lancet in September 2018. This measure was calculated for 195 countries, from 1990 to 2016, and defined for each birth cohort as the expected years lived from age 20 to 64 years and was adjusted for educational attainment, learning or education quality, and functional health status. Ireland had the sixteenth highest level of expected human capital with 24 health, education, and learning-adjusted expected years lived between age 20 and 64 years.

== See also ==
- Mental health in Ireland
- Slí na Sláinte
- Suicide in Ireland
