= Burke family =

Burke is an Anglo-Norman Irish surname. Burke family may refer to:

- House of Burgh, an Anglo-Norman noble family
- Burkes, an Australian political family
- Burke family (Castlebar), a 21st century Irish family known for high-profile legal cases and protests
