= Theresa Lowe =

Irish television presenter, lawyer and communications specialist

- Born: Ireland
- Education: University College Dublin, King's Inns
- Occupations: Barrister, television presenter
- Spouse: Frank McNamara
- Relatives: Joan Freeman (sister); Maria Steen (niece)

Theresa Lowe (born February 1963) is an Irish barrister, communications consultant, and former television presenter. She is known for presenting the game show Where in the World.

== Background ==
Lowe was born in February 1963 to parents Marie and John Lowe. She was one of eight children and grew up in Dublin. She attended University College Dublin from 1980 to 1983, graduating with a Bachelor of Arts (BA) degree in English, French, and Greek and Roman civilisation. Her sister Joan Freeman founded Pieta House, an organisation for the prevention of suicide. Her older niece is Maria Steen a barrister and architect.

== Career ==
In 1989 Lowe took over as presenter of Where in the World from her predecessor Marty Whelan. She continued on the show until its final season in 1996. In 1993, Lowe began studying at King's Inns, being called to the bar in July 1997. She specialises on criminal law and personal injury. Lowe also runs a communication company.

== Personal life ==
Lowe is married to musician Frank McNamara. The couple met in 1983 and were married in 1987. They have four children. The family are practising members of the Catholic Church.
