= Mental Health Act 2001 =

The Mental Health Act 2001 is an Act of the Irish Parliament, the Oireachtas, which sets out the legal procedures for admissions and treatment in approved centres. It aims to protect the rights of everyone using the mental health services. It aims to ensure the patient's best interest is the most important aspect of mental health. The Act says that the patient has the right to receive good quality mental health care, and mental health services should be properly run and regulated. Under the act, mental health workers are obliged to ensure the patient is treated in a way that respects their rights. The Mental Health Act 2001 was enacted by the Oireachtas of Ireland on 8 July 2001. Most of the important provisions came into force on 1 November 2006. Some less important sections came into force in 2002.

The Act provides for the involuntary civil admission of patients on grounds of mental disorder. It also established the Mental Health Commission and the Inspectorate of Mental Health Services. It established three-person (a consultant psychiatrist, a legal chair and a lay member) Mental Health Tribunals which review the detention of patients on a regular basis. A patient has the right to attend their own tribunal. It also outlines the voluntary admission policy. Patients can leave the hospital at any time if they are under voluntary status. If staff feel that they may be a harm to themselves or to others they can hold them for up to 24 hours, and they will be reviewed by two consultant psychiatrists.

There have been a number of amendments to the Act since 2006. A Revised Act, with amendments incorporated, is available on the Law Reform Commission site.
