= The Young Messiah (musical) =

Modern adaptation of Handel's oratorio

The Young Messiah is a 1982 musical production of a modern adaptation of George Frideric Handel's 1741 oratorio Messiah, It was arranged by Tom Parker, and featured vocals by Labi Siffre, Madeline Bell and Vicki Brown. A later version was produced and arranged by Frank McNamara, who also conducted the orchestra and chorus. The cast included Gladys Knight, Chaka Khan, Roger Daltrey, Jeffrey Osborne, the Irish Philharmonic Orchestra & Choir and the Visual Ministry Gospel Choir. The production included a narration, Beware of False Prophets, which was written by Frank McGuinness and performed by Aidan Quinn. The music integrates gospel, rock and soul sounds.

== Background for the later version ==
On October 5, 1999, the National Millennium Committee in Ireland committed the sum of IR£700,000 to fund the production of Messiah XXI For a New Millennium to be broadcast by the RTÉ as one of its flagship programs for the Millennium TV schedule. Séamus Brennan, T.D., chairman of the National Millennium Committee, felt that this production would have national significance and would appeal to all ages. He said: "There are many reasons why the Millennium Committee felt this was a musical event worthy of substantial support. It felt Messiah XXI will capture much of the excitement and anticipation the Millennium is generating while at the same time being an entirely appropriate modern day celebration of the 2000th anniversary of the birth of Christ. The fact it will be screened by RTÉ means virtually the entire population will have an opportunity to see it. It comes at a time when Irish music is flourishing and I am confident it will also receive considerable international attention. Another landmark aspect is that it is being performed for the first time in Dublin which obviously has direct historical links with Handel's original Messiah, also first performed in the city, 257 years ago."

The event was organized by Messiah XXI Productions, which included directors John Kearns and Bernard Bennett, who produced Faith of Our Fathers and Frank McNamara, an arranger and producer best known at that time for his work as the music director of RTE's The Late Late Show and The Irish Tenors. Leading international TV director, Bill Cosel, was hired to direct the TV coverage. RTÉ hired Paula Farrell, the Eurovision set designer, to design the set. Joe Canavan was hired as lighting designer. The Executive Producer for RTÉ was Peter Feeney. The RTÉ used its largest outside broadcast unit in filming this event. The event cost IR£1.4 million (or about US$2 million) to stage and also featured a spectacular light and sound extravaganza. The production was a labor of love for the three producers, McNamara, Kearns and Bennett, who between them personally contributed a substantial portion of the budget.

John Kearns, a director of Messiah XXI Productions, said: "Our inspiration for Messiah XXI obviously came from Handel's original masterpiece and its appropriate links with the millennium and the celebration of 2,000 years of Christianity. By re-interpreting the music in a modern idiom, with popular artists, this new version will, in our view, be immediately accessible to a much wider audience. It will allow the nation at large to discover and enjoy an important part of our musical heritage, which will stand forever on audio and visual media as a reminder of our marking of the Millennium in Ireland.

"Messiah XXI will also achieve international attention and recognition as the Irish nation's contribution to the world-wide celebrations by means of international TV coverage which has been facilitated by RTE. We are indebted to RTE for their considerable support. We are delighted too with the encouragement we have received from all the churches as this will be an ecumenical and cross-border event, with a huge choir being drawn from both territories on the island."

Two gala performances took place in Dublin, Ireland on December 4, 1999, and December 5, 1999. In addition to being broadcast during Ireland's Millennium TV schedule, the show has been shown on PBS stations throughout the United States. On October 18, 2002, Frank McNamara staged and produced a performance of Messiah XXI in Warsaw, Poland as part of a Gala Event for the President of Poland and dignitaries.

== Performances ==
- Overture – Irish Philharmonic Orchestra
- Beware of False Prophets (reading) – Aidan Quinn
- Comfort Ye – Jeffrey Osborne
- Thus Saith the Lord – Chaka Khan with members of The Visual Ministry Gospel Choir
- But Who May Abide – Gladys Knight
- Behold the Virgin Shall Conceive – Gladys Knight
- Oh Thou That Tellest Good Tidings – Gladys Knight with the Irish Philharmonic Orchestra and Chorus
- Imagine (reading) – Aidan Quinn
- There Were Shepherds/The Angel of the Lord/Glory to God in the Highest – Jeffrey Osborne, Gladys Knight with the Philharmonic Orchestra and Chorus and the Visual Ministry Gospel Choir
- Then Shall the Eyes of the Blind/He Shall Feed His Flock/Come Unto Him – Jeffrey Osborne, Gladys Knight and Roger Daltrey
- His Yoke is Easy – Irish Philharmonic Orchestra and Chorus and The Visual Ministry Gospel Choir
- Don't Let It Break Your Heart (reading) – Aidan Quinn
- Surely – The Visual Ministry Gospel Choir
- Lift Up Ye Gates – Irish Philharmonic Orchestra & Chorus
- How Beautiful Are The Feet – Jeffrey Osborne
- Hallelujah Reprise – All Artists
- I Know My Redeemer Liveth – Gladys Knight
- Do You Still Believe? (reading) – Aidan Quinn
- The Trumpet Shall Sound – Chaka Khan with The Visual Ministry Gospel Choir
- Death Where is Thy Sting/Thanks Be to God – All Artists
- Hallelujah – All Artists

== Controversies ==
=== Act of musical sacrilege ===
Although there have been other interpretations and arrangements of Handel's masterpiece by other classical musicians, including Mozart's re-orchestration, some classical music circles considered the planning of this adaptation to be an act of musical sacrilege. The Irish Independent asked the arranger and producer Frank McNamara what he had done with Handel's masterpiece.

"In some parts of the work I've done very little alteration to the original, in other places really quite a lot. You could say I have modernised it, contemporised it and certainly made it more accessible to a broader audience. I have lost a lot of the repetition that was in the original because in today's MTV world of the 10 second audience attention span it simply didn't hold up.

"At the most drastic, I've added some tunes which are, of course, based on Handel's originals. Probably the most noticeable change is that I have added a rhythm section, what one of the event's producers John Kearns refers to as the rock'n'soul element of the piece, and there are electric guitars involved! I think I have preserved the energy of Handel's original, and hope that I have added to it in a tasteful way."

As to what Maestro McNamara did with the showstopper of the show, "Hallelujah", he said "It is a little different in that I have added a couple of solo lines at the beginning. Then it falls back into the original melody with, of course, a rock beat. Then, in the middle, I introduce a gospel-style piece with a gospel group before returning to Handel's original. It is such a strong piece of music it really would be like trying to reinvent the wheel if it was changed too much."

As to the charges that he was a musical vandal, he totally rejected them, saying "I come from a classical music background, and I have an honours degree in music from Trinity College. Those who are criticising me are completely missing the point. Messiah XXI is not intended to replace The Messiah. It is simply a new version, like the remake of a film. West Side Story did little damage to Shakespeare's Romeo and Juliet; Pygmalion became My Fair Lady and nobody complained."

=== Granting of IR£700,000 ===
The granting of the IR£700,000 by the Millennium Committee was criticized by many who felt that a commercial venture such as this was not in need of grant aid and that it should have been given to more deserving artistic projects. However, earlier in the year the promoters of the show proposed that, should the show be a financial success, 10 per cent of any profits would be given to Irish charities until IR£700,000 was reached. This was one of the reasons the Committee decided to give the grant and felt that a profit would be made for years to come as the show was being televised all over the world.
