= Frank McNamara (musician) =

Irish musician

Francis Anthony McNamara (born 1960) is an Irish arranger, conductor, composer, and pianist.

== Early life ==
McNamara's career began at the age of 11, when he first appeared on Irish national television. In 1973, he won a scholarship to attend the Royal Irish Academy of Music where won the Brioscu Cup for the most outstanding pupil award. There, he studied composition with James Wilson and piano with Rhona Marshall. McNamara attended Trinity College Dublin, where he graduated with B.A. (mod) in music in 1981. Peter Katin also instructed McNamara in piano in London and Canada.

== Music ==
Irish audiences are well familiar with McNamara's work as music director of RTÉ's The Late Late Show for 20 years. He was the arranger and producer of two consecutive winners at the Eurovision Song Contest. He has composed TV themes and other music for Irish television. He has written numerous works for orchestra and has released several albums, which include his orchestral arrangements and original compositions. Those albums have resulted in two platinum albums and two gold albums.

McNamara also has an acting credit to his name. He was Reuben the pianist in Ronan O'Leary's Hello Stranger (story by Truman Capote) filmed in 1992. The movie starred Daniel J. Travanti. McNamara wrote the title song Hello Stranger and performed the song in the movie.

In 1994 and 1995 he signed up with the Icelandic National Broadcasting Service (RÚV) and rearranged Iceland's Eurovision Song Contest entries. He conducted the RTÉ Symphony Orchestra on the final night for the live performances of these entries during the Eurovision Song Contest which was hosted in Ireland in both these years. He was also the musical director of the 1997 Eurovision Song Contest, held in Dublin.

In 1998, he helped found The Irish Tenors, which group has been highly successful. He was their music director in five of their albums and three PBS specials and toured with them throughout the United States, New Zealand and Australia. Their album Ellis Island rose to number one on Billboard's World Music listing.

McNamara is the composer of a four-part movement classical work entitled Beatlesymphony, which is based on Beatles melodies and has been performed internationally. He has written an ABBA piano concerto, a Rolling Stones overture and a Simon and Garfunkel suite.

He is the producer/musical director of The Young Messiah – Messiah XXI which is an adaptation of Handel's Messiah. The CD and DVD of this work was released on 3 October 2006. The production starred Gladys Knight, Roger Daltrey, Chaka Khan, Jeffrey Osborne, the Irish Philharmonic Orchestra & Choir and the Visual Ministry Gospel Choir. On 18 October 2002, McNamara staged and produced a performance of this music in Warsaw, Poland as part of a Gala Event for the President of Poland and dignitaries.

His work with John McDermott entitled A Time to Remember was released as a PBS special and on CD and DVD and that album was number one on Billboard's World Music list.

In 2002, McNamara created the group The American Tenors. Their PBS special was filmed in Los Angeles, California, at the Kodak Theatre. Within the first few weeks of its release, The American Tenors album was at number five on Billboard's Crossover Classical Chart. They also released a slightly different version of their album in Ireland.

McNamara has made albums with The Irish Tenors, The American Tenors, Ronan Tynan, John McDermott, David Agnew, Rebecca Storm and Mary Lowe, among many others. He was the music director and toured with LeAnn Rimes during her 2004 Symphonic Christmas tour. In 2005, he was the music director of the Argent Mortgage Orchestrated concert series, which included shows with LeAnn Rimes, Seal, Jewel (singer) and Duran Duran. He has conducted some of the world's leading orchestras, including the Royal Philharmonic Orchestra, the Pittsburgh Symphony Orchestra, the Melbourne Symphony Orchestra and the Boston Pops Orchestra and conducted the Baltimore Symphony Orchestra for Ben Folds's three-concert orchestral debut in the United States.

== Personal life ==
McNamara is married to Theresa Lowe, a barrister and former RTÉ television presenter.

In the 2007 Irish general election, McNamara ran for the Progressive Democrats in Dublin South-Central, securing 474 first-preferences (1% of the poll).

== Discography ==
- (1985) Irish Reflections
- (1989) Frank McNamara and David Agnew: Music of the Night
- (1990) In a Sentimental Mood
- (1992) David Agnew: The Way I Feel
- (1995) Among My Souvenirs
- (1998) Irish Classics
- (1998) The Joys of Christmas – Eamonn Mulhall
- (1998) The Best of Frank McNamara and David Agnew
- (1999) The Irish Tenors – Live in Dublin
- (1999) The Irish Tenors – Home for Christmas
- (2000) The Irish Tenors – Live in Belfast
- (2001) The Irish Tenors – Ellis Island
- (2001) I Want to Know What Love Is – Rebecca Storm
- (2002) The Very Best of The Irish Tenors
- (2002) My Life Belongs to You – Ronan Tynan
- (2002) A Time to Remember – John McDermott
- (2003) The American Tenors
- (2006) The Young Messiah – Messiah XXI – Roger Daltrey, Gladys Knight, Chaka Khan, Jeffrey Osborne
- (2006) Mary Lowe – Jazz Diva

== Filmography ==
- (1992) Hello Stranger
- (1999) The Irish Tenors – Live in Dublin
- (2000) The Irish Tenors – Live in Belfast
- (2001) The Irish Tenors – Ellis Island
- (2000) The Irish Tenors – The Essential Collection
- (2002) A Time to Remember – John McDermott
- (2003) The American Tenors

== Notes ==
Preceded by (Norway) Frode Thingnæs	Eurovision Song Contest conductor 1997	Succeeded by (United Kingdom) Martin Koch
