= Burke family (Castlebar) =

Irish family involved in religious activism

- Country: Ireland
- Origin: Castlebar, County Mayo
- Members: Parents: Sean and Martina Burke; Children: Ammi, Elijah, Enoch, Esther, Isaac, Jemima, Josiah, Keren, Kezia, Simeon
- Traditions: Religious activism, Ireland legal cases and protests
- Website: Burke Christian School

The Burkes are an Irish family from Castlebar, County Mayo, known for their religious activism and frequent involvement in legal cases and protests in Ireland. The family's members are fundamentalist evangelical Christians. Family members are parents Sean and Martina Burke and their ten children: Ammi, Elijah, Enoch, Esther, Isaac, Jemima, Josiah, Keren, Kezia and Simeon. Subjects of their protests include student rights and the LGBTQ community in Ireland.

== Background ==
Sean Burke, a qualified electrician, and his wife, Martina (née Mayock), a qualified schoolteacher, together operate the Burke Christian School and an independent evangelical Christian church at Cloonsunna, near Castlebar in County Mayo. Each of their ten children have Old Testament Biblical names. The family is not known to associate with any other evangelical group in the west of Ireland.

=== Academia ===
The Burke children were home-schooled; several hold postgraduate or professional degrees. Isaac has a PhD in mathematics; Enoch holds a bachelor's degree in theological studies and history as well as a master's degree in education; Josiah holds an MSc in economic history. Ammi is a solicitor. Simeon won the Mayo Schools' Debating Competition alongside his brother Elijah, and represented the University of Galway at the 2020 final of the Irish Times Debate. Simeon was called to the bar in 2024, but was initially unable to find a qualified barrister to "devil" for. From October 2025 he is devilling under master barrister Ciara Davin, a sister of the conservative campaigner Maria Steen.

== Anti-LGBTQ activism ==
The Burkes have collectively expressed anti-LGBTQ views, including in 2008 when members of the family protested outside of Dáil Éireann with placards quoting a translation of a verse from Leviticus 18 which states: "Thou shalt not lie with mankind as with womankind. It is an abomination". In 2014, members of the family attending NUIG distributed leaflets linking homosexuality to incest and paedophilia. Enoch Burke picketed outside St. James's Hospital about linkages between gay men and HIV/AIDS. In 2017, 2018 and 2019, they protested against the annual gay pride parade in Castlebar.

=== Opposition to same-sex marriage (2015) ===
During the 2015 referendum on same-sex marriage, members of the family campaigned for a "no" vote, with Isaac and Enoch Burke becoming involved with the Mandate for Marriage campaign group.

About a month before the referendum took place, Martina and Enoch Burke appeared on Joe Duffy's show Liveline, arguing that a mural depicting two men embracing should be painted over due to a lack of planning permission. The Burkes unsuccessfully tried to make the case that the mural was erected illegally and was explicitly political, as the artist, Joe Caslin, had confirmed on Twitter that he had hoped to convince people to vote in favour of legalising gay marriage.

=== Negative campaigning against LGBTQ politicians (2019) ===
In 2023, an investigative report by the Irish Independent found that during the 2019 European Parliament election in Ireland, Enoch Burke spent several thousand euros to purchase attack ads on Facebook targeting LGBTQ politicians Katherine Zappone and Maria Walsh. The advertisements directed users to websites created by Enoch, with the website focusing on Katherine Zappone, accusing her of being associated with witchcraft and holding anti-Christian views.

== NUI Galway BDS challenge and NUIG Societies lifetime ban (2014–2021) ==
In 2014, Isaac, Kezia, Ammi and Enoch were attending the NUI Galway. That year, NUIG's student union held a referendum about boycott, divestment, and sanctions (BDS) against the state of Israel. The Burkes, who held all four officer positions of the university's Christian Union Society, used society funds to print leaflets advocating for a "no" vote and then distributed them. On 10 November 2019, the university's "society co-ordination group" (USCG) banned the four siblings for life from participation in NUIG societies because: the leaflets had the university's logo, which was against the code of conduct as it was misrepresentation of endorsement; the siblings' brother Josiah (who was not a NUI Galway student) had been reimbursed €325 for costs to produce the fliers; Isaac had falsified the society's accounts to conceal the payment to Josiah.

The siblings complained to the Workplace Relations Commission (WRC), where an adjudicating officer rejected their complaint. They then appealed to the Circuit Court on grounds of religious discrimination. At this point (2019), NUIG revoked their lifetime bans and offered not to seek costs if they would revoke their claim, which the Burkes refused to do. After the Burkes' insistence on the appointment of a different judge, Judge Raymond Groarke found that USCG's handling of the matter constituted an “extraordinary and inexcusable” lack of knowledge of fair or proper procedures; regardless, he rejected the Burkes' complaint that USCG's flawed handling of the case constituted discrimination on religious grounds.

== Unlawful dismissal appeal (2019–2023) ==
On 12 November 2019, Ammi Burke was fired from her position as a solicitor with the Arthur Cox law firm. Following her dismissal, the Burke family picketed the firm's offices. Ammi claimed she was unfairly dismissed due to her criticism of a partner in the firm who required her to work until 2 a.m. while her co-workers socialised. Arthur Cox disputed this, citing a breakdown in relations between Burke and three of the six senior partners as the reason for her dismissal.

Ammi made a complaint to the Workplace Relations Commission (WRC) but appealed to the High Court after the WRC adjudication officer recused herself from hearing the case. After the High Court determined there was no wrongdoing in the recusal, the case was reopened by the WRC. Ammi requested that the presiding adjudicator, Kevin Baneham, recuse himself, alleging that he was a Labour Party "comrade" of Arthur Cox's senior counsel. During the hearing, both Ammi and Martina Burke repeatedly spoke over other persons present and were so disruptive that the hearing couldn't progress and the case was dismissed.

Ammi filed an appeal to the High Court, seeking to have the WRC's decision overruled. Four days into the appeal, which was held virtually, the judge, Marguerite Bolger, threatened to mute Ammi's microphone if she continued making interruptions. In May 2023, Ammi's appeal was dismissed due to her disruption of the court proceedings.

== PhD delay action (2020) ==
In January 2020, Isaac Burke won an action he took against NUIG due to the university's delay in scheduling his thesis defence for completion of the Doctor of Philosophy degree in mathematics. Isaac submitted his thesis on 31 January 2017 but his supervisor failed to organise a viva with an external examiner. NUIG guidelines state that a viva should take place within two months of the submission of a thesis, but by July 2017, Isaac had still not been offered the opportunity to complete his examination. The court awarded Isaac €13,035 in damages. Isaac completed his PhD in 2020.

== Aftermath of the death of Sally Maaz (2020–2022) ==
In April 2020, Sally Maaz, a 17-year-old girl from Mayo with an underlying heart defect, died with COVID-19. Jemima Burke, claiming to represent a defunct newspaper, aggressively questioned chief medical officer Tony Holohan in May 2020.

An inquest was scheduled to determine Maaz's cause of death. Jemima protested because only 14 people were permitted due to COVID-19 pandemic restrictions, despite the right of public access to courts, and the preliminary hearing was adjourned to a later date. During the rescheduled inquest in February 2022, Jemima, Josiah and Martina were forcibly removed from the court by Gardaí after "causing huge distress to the bereaved family while making unfounded claims about the girl’s hospital care".

== Predicted grades appeal (2020) ==
As a result of the effects of the COVID-19 pandemic in Ireland in May 2020, instead of sitting the Leaving Certificate, students could substitute predicted grades as assigned by their teachers. Students who were homeschooled or tutored by their parents or a close relative were excluded from the scheme; this was applicable to Elijah Burke. Elijah made an appeal and in August 2020 the High Court ruled in his favour, determining that he, and other students in his position, had been unfairly excluded. Judge Charles Meenan advised that an independent teacher be involved in determining Elijah's predicted grades and described his initial exclusion from the scheme as "irrational, unreasonable and unlawful”.

== Simeon Burke at the University of Galway (2020–2021) ==
=== COVID-19 pledge appeal (2020) ===
In September 2020, NUIG instituted a mandatory pledge about COVID-19 status and certain COVID-19 response behaviors that all incoming and returning students had to sign as a condition of registration with the university. Simeon Burke led student protests against the pledge as a breach of the right to privacy, resulting in NUIG agreeing to make the pledge voluntary instead of mandatory.

=== Claim of being bullied online (2021) ===
In 2021, Simeon contested the election for the role of president of the NUIG's Students Union, having previously run for the role of Welfare and Equality Officer in 2020. Burke lost overwhelmingly in vote count against rival Róisín Nic Lochlainn in both races. On 22 February 2021, at a Students Union council meeting, Burke repeatedly interrupted, resulting in his microphone being muted by the chairperson. In protest, he held up a handwritten sign reading "Student Sworn At No Apology." Altered versions of a photo of the sign appeared on social media, ridiculing Simeon, and the dean of students asked that students refrain from further posting online about it. One student continued to use Twitter to post memes with an associated hashtag one of which was retweeted by TD politician Paul Murphy. Burke said that the aftermath, including the hashtag was sustained online abuse and intimidation, and complained to the clerk of the Dáil. An Oireachtas committee refused to investigate the matter.

== Wilson's Hospital School dispute (2022–present) ==
In June 2022, Enoch Burke was suspended from Wilson's Hospital School, a Church of Ireland co-educational boarding school in County Westmeath, where he had been employed as a teacher.

The issue arose when the parents of a transgender student who wanted to transition requested that they/them pronouns be used for the student, along with their new name, which was affirmed by the school. At a church service attended by staff, clergy, pupils, parents and board members, Burke interrupted by voicing his objections to addressing the student as "they" and to the school acknowledging the student's transition, as well as transgender identity more broadly. Later that day, Burke sought out and questioned the school's principal about Wilson's Hospital School's official stance regarding student transition. She told him that she would speak with him at a later date and walked away. Burke pursued her so vehemently that others present had to intervene so she could leave. As a result of this behaviour, Burke was suspended, pending a disciplinary review. Following his suspension, Burke continued to enter the school grounds. On 30 August 2022, the school requested and was granted a High Court interim injunction preventing him from either being on school premises or teaching classes there for the duration of his suspension.

On 1 September 2022, Burke allegedly breached the injunction and a further court order was sought by the school, which could result in Burke being jailed for contempt of court unless he agreed to abide by the terms of the interim injunction. Burke failed to appear at the High Court as required, on 2 September 2022, and judge Miriam O'Regan granted an order for his arrest due to contempt of court. On 5 September 2022, Burke was arrested after arriving at the school premises in spite of the injunction. He was remanded to Mountjoy Prison for contempt of court. During an enforced appearance before the High Court on 7 September 2022, Burke declined to purge his contempt; Judge Max Barrett remanded him to custody at Mountjoy Prison for a further week and awarded costs against him. Burke said that he would rather stay in prison "every hour of every day for the next 100 years" than comply. He also said that being transgender contradicts scripture and that he would "only obey God" and "not obey man".

On 4 October 2022, Burke filed an appeal at the Court of Appeal against the injunction. He asked for two orders: one preventing the school from continuing his paid administrative leave and the disciplinary process against him and a second preventing the school from dismissing him from his position. On 9 October 2022, the Irish Independent reported that Burke had been moved to a new jail cell for his own safety, after repeatedly expressing his outspoken views to other prisoners. The Irish Times subsequently reported that Burke alleged that he had been defamed in the Irish Independent article and was seeking an order banning its republication. On 14 October 2022, Martina Burke was removed from the courtroom after accusing the judge of corruption, while Ammi Burke refused to apologise to the court for continuing to interrupt proceedings.

On 13 December 2022, Enoch Burke requested Justice Conor Dignam to release him from custody, telling the court that he was "not a thief, a murderer or a drug dealer" and was behind bars because of his religious objections to "transgenderism". The judge refused, as Burke would not purge his contempt or stay away from Wilson's Hospital School until the conclusion of the disciplinary process.

On 21 December 2022, while the school was closed for Christmas holidays, Burke was released from prison following a ruling by Judge Brian O'Moore: he was informed that he would remain at liberty unless he breached the injunction preventing his attendance at school while suspended. Judge O'Moore said "it was difficult to avoid the conclusion that Mr Burke was exploiting his imprisonment for his own ends" and cited the cost to the public and the desire to "not enable somebody found to be in contempt of court to garner some advantage from that defiance" as reasons to release Burke from imprisonment. On 5 and 6 January 2023, Burke reappeared at the school; although the Gardaí were aware of the situation, they stated: "[because] these matters refer to a civil order, An Garda Síochána has no role at this time."

=== Dismissal from employment ===
The full disciplinary hearing into Burke's behaviour took place on 19 January 2023 at the Mullingar Park Hotel, with Gardaí being called as the meeting was disrupted by the Burke family. Burke was formally dismissed from his teaching role on 20 January 2023. Despite the termination of his employment, Burke entered the school premises twice on 24 January 2023 and was arrested under the Public Order Act and for trespass. It was now a criminal matter and a file was subsequently sent by the Gardaí to the Director of Public Prosecutions.

On 26 January 2023, Judge O'Moore imposed a fine of €700 per day, effective from 2 pm on 27 January 2023 onward, if Burke did not purge the contempt of court. Burke had appeared at the school on January 24, 25 and 26. On 10 February 2023, Enoch Burke and his sister Ammi made an unscheduled appearance at the High Court, causing an adjournment when they made abusive comments to the presiding judge.

On 19 February 2023, Fred Phelps Jr, pastor of the controversial Westboro Baptist Church in America, said that though he supported Burke's position, he felt he had "gone too far".

On 7 March 2023, the Court of Appeal ruled against Enoch Burke. Family members Ammi, Simeon, Isaac, Sean, Martina and Enoch were ejected from the court by Gardaí due to their disruption when the judge attempted to read the judgment. Simeon was remanded in custody for breach of the peace. He refused to take up bail (which was unopposed) and, as a result, was unable to sit his King's Inns law exams. On 17 April 2023, Simeon Burke was convicted of causing a breach of the peace at the Court of Appeal on 7 March 2023 and was fined €300 for the incident.

On 28 August 2023, Enoch Burke returned to Wilson's Hospital School on the first day of the 2023/2024 school year, taking up a position in a school corridor to continue his protest. At that time, he was liable for €140,000 in fines for breach of court orders. He was remanded in custody in September 2023, for failure to comply with court orders to stay away from the school. On 12 December 2023, a court sitting heard that Burke was refusing to purge his contempt or to confirm that he would obey the court order; Judge Mark Sanfey ruled that he should remain in prison.

In June 2024, Enoch Burke lost his defamation action against the Irish Independent. The judge said that the seven paragraphs Enoch Burke had complained about were untrue, which was "unfortunate", but that they did not damage his reputation. He also added that if the article had been defamatory the public interest defence would not have been available to the defendants.

Burke was released from jail in late June 2024, at the start of school summer holidays, but he did not agree to obey the court order. In late August 2024 he was seen on the school grounds and once in a building on the premises. As a result, Burke was jailed for a third time in early September.

On 11 October 2024, Justice David Nolan asked Burke if he would now abide by the injunction to stay away from the school. At this point, Burke had been imprisoned (intermittently) for about 400 days. Burke didn't respond directly to the judge. Nolan said, "I have now asked you on 10 occasions will you abide by the court order and it is clear to me you have no intention of abiding by the order. In those circumstances, with great reluctance, I have to send you back to jail." Nolan put the matter up for review again on 20 December 2024.

On 25 March 2025, the High Court ordered Bank of Ireland to transfer €40,000 from Enoch Burke's bank account into a Courts Service account within seven days, as a part-payment of almost €80,000 in fines owed by Burke.

On 8 April 2025, a judge in the High Court commented that Enoch Burke had been conducting himself like an "unruly schoolboy" and made him liable for costs in the action taken over the unpaid fines. During the court sitting, Burke's mother and sister Ammi were removed by gardaí.

By 5 November 2025 Burke had spent more than 500 days in prison for contempt of court and been fined more than €200,000, all in relation to this case. Four other members of the family were removed from the court by police for due to their continued interruptions of the hearing.

On 18 November 2025, a High Court judge ordered that Burke again be recalled to prison for "grotesque" conduct, in which he continued to present himself at the school and engage in intimidating behaviour. On 25 November 2025 he was arrested and brought to Mountjoy Prison.

On 14 January 2026, Burke was again released from Mountjoy Prison to enable him to prepare for a new legal case, on the condition that he does not visit Wilson's Hospital School. Burke returned to the school grounds the following day, accompanied by a group of his supporters. A court order was made on Friday, 16 January 2026 for his arrest once again for violating the conditions of his release. Burke was arrested and returned to prison on 19 January 2026. As of March 2026, he was imprisoned in Castlerea Prison.

On 24 April 2026, Burke attended an appeal against his dismissal at the Department of Education in Athlone. He had been brought there from Castlebar prison. Burke objected to Wilson's Hospital School having legal representation. His behaviour was described as disruptive and eventually the independent chair of the Decision Appeals Panel requested he be removed. The schools' board of management representatives then presented its case in his absence. He was eventually allowed back into the room after the school's legal team had finished their case, but he became disruptive again.

On 20 May 2026, Burke's dismissal was affirmed by the appeals panel following four years of legal wrangling. He appeared in the High Court by video link from Castlerea Prison and said he was "still an employee of Wilson's Hospital School".

On 2 July 2026, the High Court ordered Burke's release from prison due to a "material change in circumstances", given that his dismissal was affirmed and the school year had finished. On 27 August 2026, Burke once again appeared outside Wilson's Hospital School on the first day of term.

On 15 October 2026 the High Court ordered that Enoch Burke be arrested and sent to Mountjoy for 18 breaches of an order preventing him from tresspassing on the premises of Wilsons' School.

== The Ireland Funds protest (2025) ==
In March 2025, several members of the Burke family travelled to the US, where, on 12 March, they held a protest outside the White House in Washington, DC during a meeting between the Taoiseach, Micheál Martin, and US president, Donald Trump. On 13 March, they staged a protest at a gala fundraising dinner for The Ireland Funds, interrupting a presentation to Dan Quinn, head coach of the Washington Commanders American football team. Martina, Ammi and Isaac Burke, who managed to gain entrance to the building where the fundraiser was taking place, were ejected from the venue. While addressing members of the press present, they walked away upon discovering that they all worked for Irish media outlets.
