= Mental Health Commission (Ireland) =

The Mental Health Commission is an independent body formed in 2002. Its functions were established by the Mental Health Act 2001 to regulate and inspect mental health services in Ireland. It is (also set down by the Act) the facilitator of the Mental health tribunal system in Ireland. The Commission appoints the panel members which sit on tribunals.

The organisation inspects approved centres (registered by the Commission) once a year and issues an inspection report. The regulator has numerous statutory powers available to it to ensure compliance by healthcare providers.

The Assisted Decision Making (Capacity) Act 2015 provides for the establishment of the Decision Support Service within the Mental Health Commission to support decision-making by and for adults with capacity difficulties and to regulate individuals who are providing support to people with capacity difficulties. The Decision Support Service has yet to commence its work.

Mental Health Commission
| Abbreviation | MHC |
| Formed | 2002 |
| Role | Independent Regulator |
| Legal status | Operational |
| Headquarters | Waterloo Road, Dublin 4, Ireland |
| Country | Ireland |
| Chief Executive | John Farrelly |
| Website | www.mhcirl.ie |

== See also ==
- Mental health in Ireland
