= Joan Freeman (politician) =

Irish psychologist and politician (born 1958)

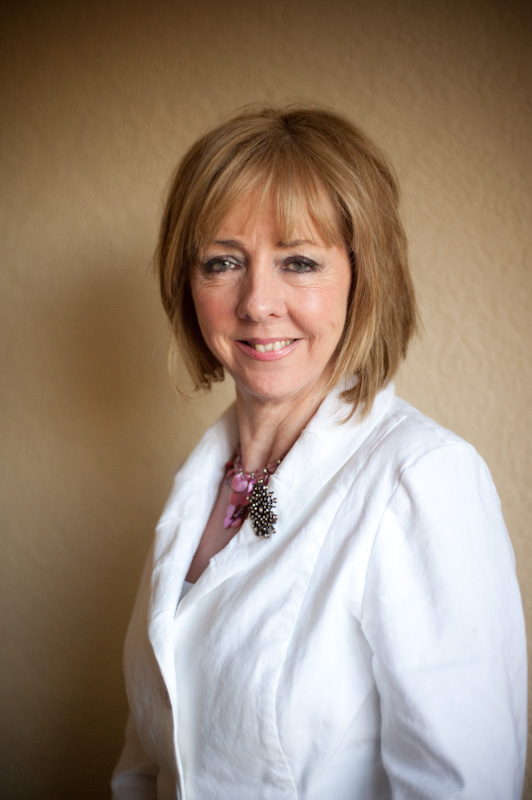
- Freeman in 2010

Senator
- In office 8 June 2016 – 29 June 2020
- Constituency: Nominated by the Taoiseach

Personal details
- Born: Joan Lowe; 2 April 1958 (age 68) Dublin, Ireland
- Party: Independent
- Spouse: Patrick Freeman (m. 1982)
- Children: 4
- Relatives: Theresa Lowe (sister); Maria Steen (niece)
- Education: Open University

Joan Freeman (née Lowe; born 2 April 1958) is an Irish psychologist, mental health activist and an independent politician who served as a Senator from 2016 to 2020, after being nominated by the then Taoiseach, Enda Kenny. She is the founder of Pieta House, a national mental health services charity. She resigned from Pieta House in 2014. She was an unsuccessful candidate in the 2018 presidential election.

== Pieta House ==
Freeman is the founder of Pieta House, a suicide intervention charity established in 2006 in Lucan, County Dublin. Since 2006, Pieta House has established twelve additional centres across Ireland with almost 270 therapists and administration staff, providing free therapeutic services to over 30,000 people. In 2008, Freeman founded the annual fund-raising event Darkness into Light in aid of Pieta House. Begun with 400 participants, approximately 200,000 people participated in the May 2018 recent iteration of the event. The 5 km walk took place across 180 venues worldwide. Then Taoiseach Leo Varadkar was among the 15,000 people who undertook the walk in Dublin's Phoenix Park.

Freeman resigned from Pieta House in 2014, in order to concentrate on developing Solace House, a similar charity based in New York City launched in 2015. The service was initially created to serve the Irish diaspora in New York, but has since supported and counselled people from many nationalities.

== Governance Issues at Pieta House ==
As the founder and former CEO of Pieta House, Freeman faced scrutiny over governance failures during her tenure. A 2012 audit by Pobal, a government funding agency, identified issues such as the use of pre-signed blank cheques, inadequate financial controls, and improper allocation of public funds. These findings led to Pieta House refunding over €30,000 in misallocated grants in 2013.

== Political career ==
In 2016, Freeman was nominated by then Taoiseach, Enda Kenny, as a member of Seanad Éireann. She helped form, and now chairs, Ireland's first Committee on the Future of Mental Healthcare. She is also a member of the Joint Committee on Children and Youth Affairs. She is a former member of the Council for Justice and Peace of the Irish Catholic Bishops' Conference, at one time speaking to raise awareness on suicide prevention training programmes provided by Pieta House.

Freeman received the nomination of four councils required to be a candidate in the 2018 presidential election. The incumbent President Michael D. Higgins was running for re-election and an election was held on 26 October 2018.

The Times described Freeman as having "strong family links with the anti-abortion movement". Her sister, Theresa Lowe, and her niece, Maria Steen, argued for a No vote in the referendum to repeal the Eighth Amendment on televised debates on RTÉ and TV3. Freeman had said that although she voted No in the referendum, she "would be happy to carry the voice of the people and sign resulting legislation into law as president" and noted her daughter's involvement in the Yes campaign. Independent TD Mattie McGrath will support Freeman if she runs, stating that "a good Catholic president would be refreshing". If elected, Freeman had said she would have set up a "National Assembly of Well-being".

During the campaign, the Irish Independent reported on a speech by Freeman in which she claimed that her eczema had been miraculously cured following a visit to Knock Shrine when she was a teenager.

== Presidential campaign financing ==
During her 2018 presidential bid, Freeman received a €120,000 loan from Des Walsh, a former boyfriend and then-president of Herbalife Nutrition. Her acceptance of this loan raised questions, particularly given Herbalife's past controversies, including allegations of operating as a pyramid scheme. Freeman defended her decision, stating she trusted Walsh's character and did not feel the need for a background check.

Freeman's 2018 presidential campaign incurred expenses exceeding €250,000. Finishing fifth in the election, she did not qualify for reimbursement of these expenses, leading to discussions about the financial prudence of her campaign. Despite the losses, Freeman maintained that running for president was a valuable experience.

== Personal life ==
Freeman is a native of Dublin. The sixth of the eight children of Marie and John Lowe, she lived in Warwickshire, England, where her parents moved when she was a baby. Her family returned to Dublin when she was 12, and her father took up a job managing his brother's pub, The Sword, on Camden Street.

She is married to Patrick Freeman and has four children. She holds a degree and MA in psychology. In June 2018, Freeman received the Trailblazer Award from the Women's Executive Network, Ireland. In 2019, Trinity College Dublin awarded her with an honorary doctorate.
