= David Hall (campaigner) =

Irish businessman and campaigner

- Born: 1970 or 1971 (age 54–55)
- Education: St. Patrick's College, Maynooth, Republic of Ireland
- Years active: 1992 - Present
- Political party: Fianna Fáil (until September 2008)
- Spouse: Susan Wiseman Hall
- Children: 3

David Hall is an Irish businessman and campaigner, best known as the owner of Lifeline Ambulance Services, chief executive officer of the Irish Mortgage Holders Organisation and cofounder of iCare Housing. Hall is also the former interim CEO of the former scandal hit charity Console.

== Biography ==
Hall grew up in Blanchardstown, County Dublin.

Hall studied at St. Patrick's College, Maynooth where he was elected as Vice-President and Welfare Officer of the Maynooth Students' Union in 1990. During Hall's tenure, the Student Union held a referendum in which they voted in favour of demanding access to condoms on campus. However, condoms could only be distributed from pharmacies until 1993 and no action could be taken. As welfare officer, Hall dealt with students asking for help with abortions, which was also illegal in Ireland at the time. Hall helped arrange for at least two women to receive abortions outside of Ireland with the help of a local doctor.

Hall founded the Make a Wish Foundation Ireland in 1992.

In 1999 Hall, a qualified paramedic, founded the Lifeline ambulance service. The company later grew to be Ireland’s largest private ambulance operator by 2013. Also in 1999 Hall joined the international Make-A-Wish board; in 2001 he was asked to become its international chair. After his term as chair at Make-A-Wish, Hall served as chairman of the Marie Keating Foundation for seven years.

In the 2000s Hall was involved in the gambling sector; Hall was a spokesperson for the Gaming and Leisure Association of Ireland until 2009 and was involved in Fitzwilliam Casino until 2014.

In 2009 Hall founded New Beginnings along with lawyers Ross Maguire and Vincent Martin, to campaign and fight for those in mortgage arrears. David Hall left the organisation in July 2012 over differences with the commercial route being taken. and in 2012, David founded the Irish Mortgage Holders Organisation (IMHO).

In 2013, he unsuccessfully took the government to court over the issuing and payment of promissory notes, which he appealed to the Supreme Court of Ireland.

After controversies over its founder and CEO Paul Kelly, in 2016 the board of Console appointed Hall as its Interim CEO.

In 2017, Hall was appointed to the Venerable Order of St. John by Queen Elizabeth II in recognition of his charitable works and contribution to society. Also in 2017 Hall co-founded an approved housing body iCare Housing who provide social housing for people who cannot afford to provide a home for themselves.

== Politics ==
Hall was a member of Fianna Fáil until the collapse of the Celtic Tiger and the subsequent Irish bank guarantee of September 2008. Before that, Hall had campaigned for Fianna Fáil minister Brian Lenihan Jnr.

In September 2013 Hall claimed that he had been approached separately by ordinary members of Fianna Fáil, Fine Gael and the Labour Party about standing as their candidate in the 2014 European Parliament election in Ireland in the Dublin constituency. However, Hall ultimately did not run in that election. Instead, Hall unsuccessfully ran as an Independent in the May 2014 by-election in Dublin West. During the campaign was involved in a blackmail scandal. Hall contacted the Gardai after a person contacted him and asked for €10,000 in exchange for not releasing a video clip of Hall speaking. The video clip, shot on a mobile phone in 2007, showed Hall saying ”everyone should have one”. Asked what he means, he says “blacks”. Hall stated that the clip was taken completely out of context and that the conversation was “banter between friends”.

In 2025, Hall expressed interest in running as a candidate in the 2025 Irish presidential election. He stated he had previously considered running in the 2018 Irish presidential election.

== Revenue tax default ==
In 2016 whistleblowers accused David Hall and Life Line Ambulance Services of 'serious wrongdoing' and claimed unfair dismissal and were the first employees to ever win court protection under the whistleblower protection legislation Mick Dougan and Sean Clarke claimed they were made redundant for making a protected disclosure to Revenue about the company in January 2015.

In a November 2017 interview, Hall stated he was pro-choice in terms of abortion. In the same interview, Hall expressed political admiration for Irish presidents Mary Robinson and Michael D. Higgins.

In March 2020 it was revealed that Life Line Ambulance Service was found after an audit to owe Revenue €416,965, including interest and penalties, for under-declaration of PAYE, PRSI, and USC.
