= Maria Steen =

Irish conservative campaigner

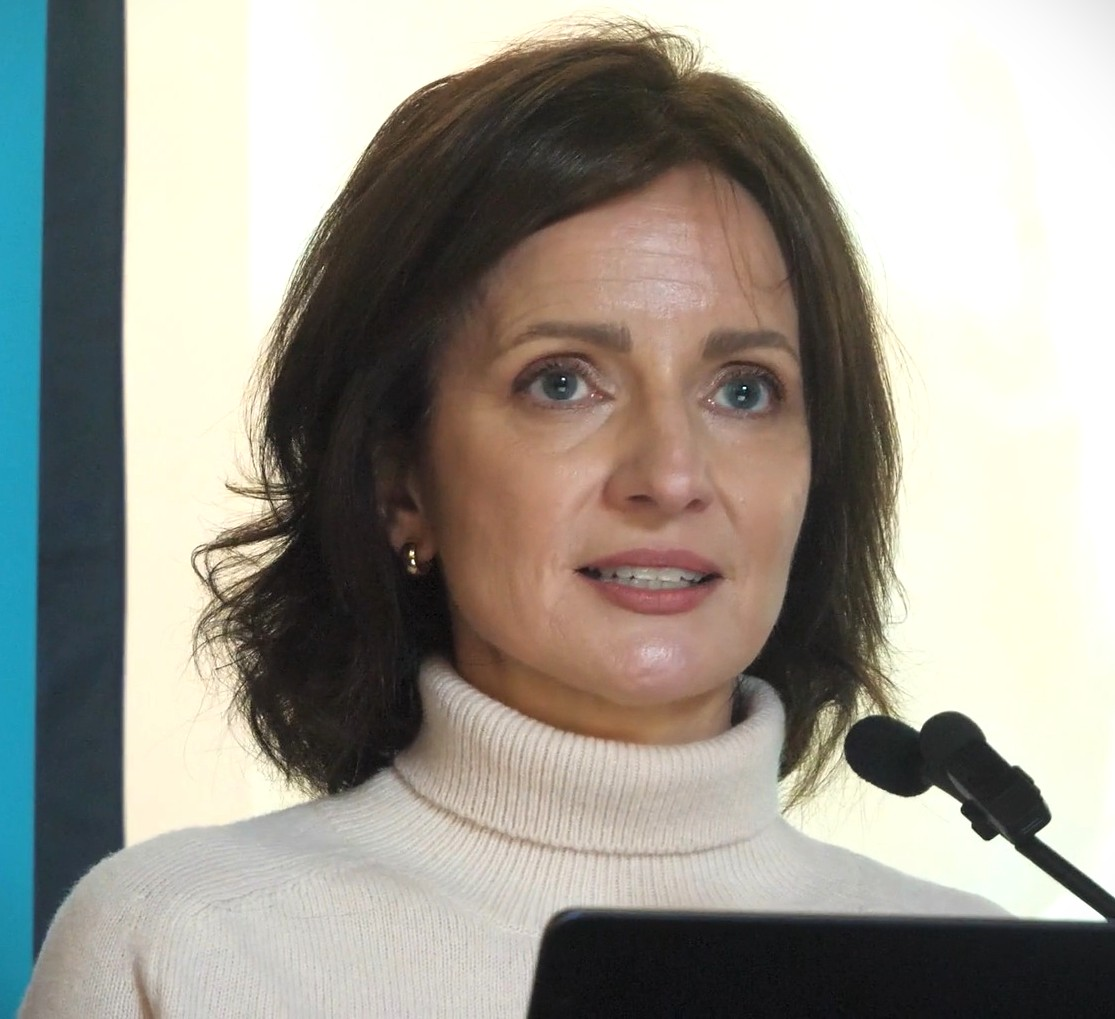
- Steen in 2025
- Born: Maria Davin; Ireland
- Education: University College Dublin; King's Inns
- Occupation: Homemaker
- Known for: Conservative campaigner
- Spouse: Neil Steen (m. 2006) (barrister)
- Children: 5
- Relatives: Joan Freeman (aunt); Theresa Lowe (aunt)
- Website: mariasteen.ie

Maria Steen (née Davin) is an Irish conservative campaigner and a member of the Iona Institute, a socially conservative and Catholic lobbyist organisation. She earned a degree in architecture from University College Dublin and later qualified as a barrister. She campaigned unsuccessfully against the 2015 referendum to legalise same-sex marriage in Ireland and the 2018 referendum to legalise abortion. She was part of the successful campaign against the 2024 referendums to expand the constitutional definition of family and to replace language relating to women's duties in the home with a gender-neutral article on care. In 2025, she failed in her bid to run in the 2025 Irish presidential election, falling two nominations short of the 20 required from members of the Oireachtas to qualify for the ballot. She is currently a homemaker and homeschools her five children.

== Early life ==
Steen grew up in Ballsbridge and is the daughter of property developer and auctioneer Seán Davin and Margaret Davin (née Lowe). Her aunts include former presidential candidate Joan Freeman and barrister, communications consultant and former RTÉ presenter Theresa Lowe. Her mother, Margaret Davin (née Lowe), taught her to read, write, and tell the time before she began school, something Steen has cited as shaping her later decision to homeschool her own children. Steen's sister, Ciara Davin, is a barrister known for agreeing to provide the mandatory pupillage to fellow barrister Simeon Burke resolving a dispute between Burke and the Bar Council.

Steen graduated from University College Dublin in 1999 with a degree in architecture and worked as an architectural assistant with the firm Scott Tallon Walker. She later studied at King's Inns and was called to the bar in 2003 before voluntarily disbarring after the birth of her children. She has stated she qualified as a primary school Montessori teacher to homeschool her children "to the best of [her] ability".

== Political campaigning ==
=== Anti-abortion campaigning ===
Steen has been involved with the Irish anti-abortion movement since the 1990s, and was a spokesperson for the Pro Life Campaign during the 2000s.

Steen opposed the Protection of Life During Pregnancy Act 2013, legislation proposed after the judgment of the ECHR in A, B and C v Ireland (2010). In line with the judgment of the Supreme Court of Ireland in the X Case (1992), this permitted abortion where there was a risk to a woman's life from suicide. Steen claimed this was "wrong and unnecessary".

She represented the Iona Institute at the Citizen's Assembly, which was discussing Irish abortion law. She campaigned for a No vote in the 2018 Irish abortion referendum, participating in TV debates in the lead-up to the vote. The proposal was approved by a 66% majority on a turnout of 64%.

=== Involvement in same-sex marriage referendum ===
In the run-up to the 2015 same-sex marriage referendum, she was among the Iona Institute members who threatened legal action against RTÉ over claims by drag-artist Panti that the Iona Institute was homophobic. She received part of the €85,000 settlement (a.k.a. "Pantigate"). Panti would later point out that the handbag carried by Steen at the press conference following her failure to secure a presidential nomination was a Hermès designer bag, costing in excess of €20,000.

She participated in TV debates in the run-up to the referendum. The amendment was approved in the referendum by 62% of voters on a turnout of 61%.

=== 2024 constitutional referendums on family and care ===
In 2024, Steen campaigned against two proposed amendments to the Constitution of Ireland: the Thirty-ninth Amendment on the Family, which proposed to extend the constitutional definition of family to "other durable relationships" in addition to marriage, and the Fortieth Amendment, on Care, which proposed to remove references to women's "life within the home" and mothers' "duties in the home", and to add a new gender-neutral article on care within the family. Steen joined a group of barristers, Lawyers for No, to voice concern about the potential unintended consequences of these proposed changes. The group also included Senator Michael McDowell, Michael McNamara TD and Brenda Power. Steen appeared in an RTÉ television debate with then-Tánaiste Micheál Martin. Both proposed amendments were rejected, by 67.7 and 73.9 percent of voters, respectively.

=== 2025 Irish presidential election ===
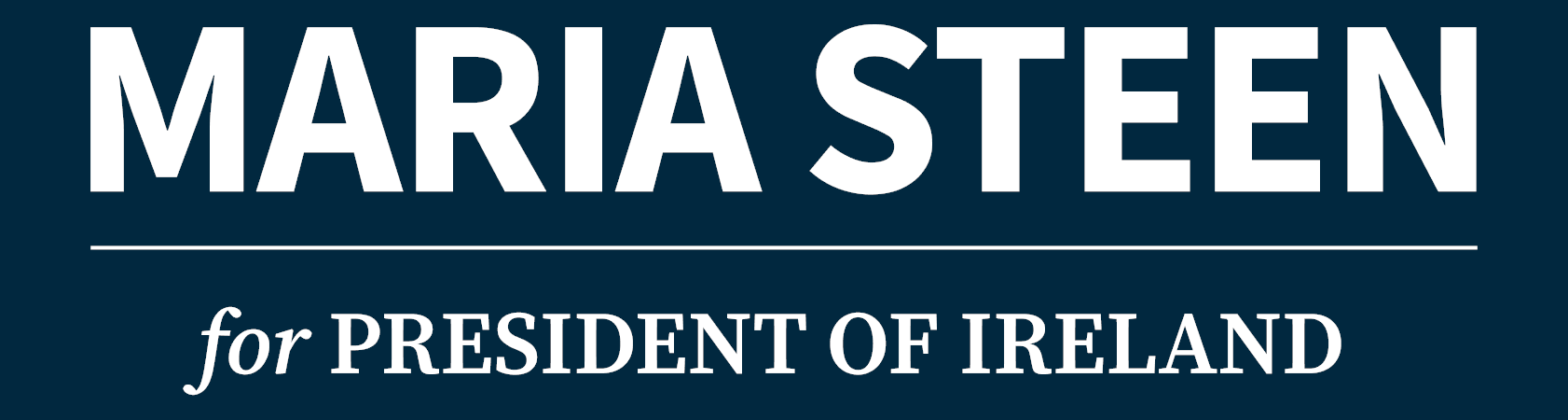
Logo used by Steen during her campaign for a nomination

In August 2025, Steen confirmed her intention to seek nominations to contest the 2025 Irish presidential election as an independent candidate. Irish Times columnist Fintan O'Toole stated that he would not personally vote for Steen, but argued that Irish democracy would benefit from having her on the ballot and in the presidential debates as an "able, articulate and patently sincere advocate for the conservative side". He encouraged independent members of the Oireachtas to nominate her. Aontú pledged to help her seek a nomination from county councils, but no candidate achieved the required support of four county councils for the first time since 1990. In attempting to gain the required 20 nominations from members of the Oireachtas, Steen secured support from seven independent TDs (Paul Gogarty, Marian Harkin, Danny Healy-Rae, Michael Healy-Rae, Mattie McGrath, Carol Nolan, and Gillian Toole), four Independent Ireland TDs (Michael Collins, Michael Fitzmaurice, Richard O'Donoghue, and Ken O'Flynn), and two Aontú TDs (Paul Lawless and Peadar Tóibín). She also secured nominations from Aontú senator Sarah O'Reilly and independent senators Joe Conway, Sharon Keogan, Aubrey McCarthy, and Rónán Mullen. She received 18 nominations by the deadline of noon on 24 September but conceded defeat after falling two short of qualifying for the ballot.

At a press briefing to make a statement about her failed presidential bid, Steen carried a luxury Hermès handbag which was estimated to cost between €10,000 and €40,000. This was met with negative commentary in the press and on social media, with Steen admitting that she did it deliberately "to expose the hypocrisy of the left who don’t love the poor; they just hate the rich.” Brendan O'Connor claimed that Steen "wants freedom of speech and democracy. But she’s not happy when the consequences of it go against her." Miriam Lord described her as "whingeing".

Steen became involved in a public row with Senator Michael McDowell, claiming that he had declined to nominate her due to a disagreement the previous year about which of them would appear on RTÉ Television to debate Micheál Martin over the 2024 constitutional referendums. McDowell denied Steen's claims and described her as a "divisive person". The pair accused each other of defamation. McDowell went on to write an opinion piece for The Irish Times where he explained that he "would not propose a candidate for the presidency to whose election I was opposed." Stating that he had always been "consistently liberal on social and economic matters", he noted his opposition to Steen's anti-abortion views and said that her election as president "would have been divisive and a step backwards for the kind of Ireland I believe in".

== Political views and profile ==
Steen frames her political and social positions through Catholic social teaching, opposing abortion, euthanasia, assisted suicide and the death penalty, and has cited papal encyclicals such as Evangelium Vitae to emphasise the sanctity of life from conception to natural death. She also opposed same-sex marriage and campaigned against its legalisation in Ireland. In July 2026, Steen stated "our children are now indoctrinated in school into belief that abortion is ok…that a child can have two mummies or two daddies".

Steen has argued that Christianity forms an integral part of Ireland's national identity and has opposed proposals to remove references to God from judicial declarations and other aspects of public life. She has argued that Ireland is experiencing a crisis of identity arising from a decline in its religious and cultural heritage, has criticised what she describes as secular and progressive trends in Irish public life, and has expressed concern about demographic decline, arguing that it poses a greater long-term challenge than climate change.

Steen has promoted her values of homeschooling and the primacy of parents in education, defended the role of stay-at-home mothers, and argued that constitutional protections for the family and home should be preserved. In 2022, she spoke out against what she called "gender-erasing mania", arguing that Article 41.2 of the Constitution should be retained as it acknowledges the contribution women make in the home. She said the provision does not confine women to the home but honours their role in family and society. Steen maintained that women are generally more invested in homemaking than men, and that this idea should not be dismissed as a stereotype. She accused feminists of inconsistency for seeking recognition of unpaid care work while pushing to remove constitutional acknowledgement of it.

During her pursuit of a presidential nomination, Steen was described by the Irish Examiner as a "strong debater" and by columnist Mick Clifford as "a highly able debater", and by The Irish Times as "an intelligent and compelling advocate for stay-at-home mothers" with "considerable political experience" campaigning in various referendums.

== Personal life ==
In May 2006, she married Neil Steen, a senior counsel. The couple have five children, whom Steen homeschools. The family has lived in south Dublin, and a 2016 renovation of their multimillion-euro home in Blackrock was featured in the property section of The Irish Times. She has also qualified as a barrister, but has not practised since the birth of her children. She trained as a Montessori teacher. She writes for The Irish Catholic.
