= Pieta House =

Irish mental health charity

Pieta
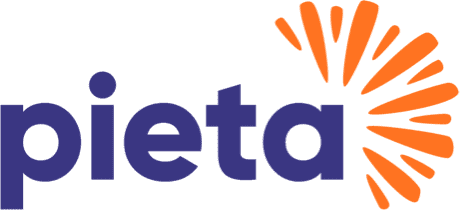
- Named after: Michelangelo's Pietà
- Formation: 2006
- Founder: Joan Freeman
- Founded at: Lucan, Dublin, Ireland
- Type: Charity
- Registration no.: 20062026
- Purpose: "Promotion of health, including the prevention or relief of sickness, disease or human suffering"
- Headquarters: Tallaght, Dublin
- Region served: Ireland
- CEO: Stephanie Manahan
- Board of directors: Terry Wade (Chair), Anne Bradley, Angela Walsh, John Casey, Majella Gallagher, Mary Walshe
- Revenue: €14million in 2024
- Website: https://pieta.ie
- Formerly called: Pieta House

Pieta (formerly Pieta House) is an Irish suicide and self-harm prevention charity established in 2006 by former Irish politician Joan Freeman. The organisation provides support for individuals experiencing suicidal ideation, self-harm, or bereavement following suicide. Services are delivered from several locations in Ireland, as well as online, through phone and video support. Pieta's flagship fundraising is Darkness Into Light. Like a number of other charities, it has also been subject to public scrutiny regarding its governance and operations.

== History ==
=== Formation and growth ===
Pieta House was founded in 2006 by Joan Freeman in Lucan, County Dublin. The inception of the mental health organisation stemmed from a recognition of the need for specialised services addressing suicide and self-harm. The goal of the organisation was to create a non-clinical, community-based approach to crisis intervention, offering free, professional support to individuals in distress. The organisation's focus on accessibility meant no referrals were required, and all services were provided at no cost.

In 2016, following the closure of the suicide-prevention charity Console due to governance issues, the Health Service Executive (HSE) arranged for Pieta to take over Console's counselling services and clients. This transition involved Pieta assuming responsibility for a number of centres previously operated by Console, as well their staff.

The organisation, which was originally branded as "Pieta House", was rebranded simply as "Pieta" in 2018.

Over time, the organisation expanded its services and invested in digital outreach and support systems, including online counselling and enhanced helpline services. As of 2025, it was operating in 28 service locations around Ireland.

=== COVID impacts ===
In 2020, the postponement of several fundraising events during the COVID-19 pandemic led to a reported shortfall of about €6.5 million. To manage this, Pieta implemented temporary salary reductions of up to 30% and announced redundancies across its workforce.

=== Centre closures and restructuring (2020–2026) ===
Services at Pieta House North West in Letterkenny, which opened in 2017, have been significantly cut back. In 2020, a local petition gathered opposing the cuts had gathered 6,200 signatures .

In 2024, the independent TD Sean Canney expressed concern after the CEO of Pieta confirmed they intended to close the therapy centre in Tuam, which had been serving the community for eleven years and was funded through local fundraising efforts.

In August 2025, Pieta announced a major restructuring programme aimed at saving approximately €3 million, citing an unsustainable financial position due to a significant decline in fundraising, rising operational costs, and broader economic pressures. The charity reported that fundraising had fallen by nearly 25% in recent years, and that the organisation had been drawing €2.5–€3 million annually from its reserves.

In March 2026, Pieta confirmed that three centres — in Waterford, Athlone, and Tralee — would close their existing premises and move to a "co-located outreach model" within HSE Integrated Healthcare Areas, as part of cost-cutting measures. The Athlone centre on Sean Costello Street was given a three-month notice period with the landlord. Pieta described the move as delivering care in "more integrated, accessible and cost-effective" settings. Midlands MEP Ciaran Mullooly sought an urgent meeting with Pieta CEO Stephanie Manahan over the Athlone closure. The planned closure of Pieta's Waterford service centre prompted the local Darkness Into Light organising committee to cancel the 2026 walk in Waterford city.

== Services ==
Pieta provides educational programmes aimed at "promoting positive mental health and building resilience". Through programmes such as the Resilience Academy and Amber Flag, Pieta reached 193,373 students and community members in 2024. A total of 532 schools and organisations earned Amber Flags, and 98 schools participated in the Resilience Academy.

Pieta operates a 24/7 crisis helpline and text service, staffed by qualified counsellors and psychotherapists. In 2024, this service received 99,946 calls and texts.

Pieta also provides counselling and psychotherapy services. The charity's counselling staff are required to be fully qualified and accredited with a professional counselling body in Ireland. Up to 12 free sessions are available to individuals affected by suicidal ideation or self-harm and up to 30 free sessions are available to individuals bereaved by suicide. These services are available in-person, in any of the locations across Ireland, as well as virtually, by phone or by video.

According to the organisation, in 2022, it "delivered over 51,000 hours of intervention and bereavement counselling and received almost 100,000 crisis support calls and texts".

Pieta took over a Suicide Bereavement Liaison Service, following dissolution of the charity Console. This service provides specialist in-person supports to people bereaved by suicide. Its Suicide Bereavement Liaison Service supported 526 households bereaved by suicide in 2024.

== Fundraising and awareness ==
The Darkness Into Light (DIL) walk is Pieta's largest fundraising and awareness event. In 2024, 98,443 participants joined events across 212 Irish communities and 12 countries worldwide, raising €4.52 million.

In March 2026, the Waterford city DIL organising committee unanimously voted to cancel the 2026 walk. Representatives of the committee stated that the decision was made in response to Pieta closing its Waterford centre, stating the committee could not justify asking the public for money while the local centre was closing. Committee member and local councillor Jim Griffin noted that while counsellors would transfer to the new co-located service, front-of-house and administrative staff would lose their jobs. The cancellation applied only to the Waterford city walk; other Darkness Into Light events in County Waterford (Dungarvan, Tramore, Dunhill and Portlaw) were unaffected. Pieta ultimately moved it's services in Waterford into a co-located facility with the HSE.

== Governance and financial management ==
Pieta is a registered charity in Ireland (CHY 16913) overseen by a voluntary board of trustees. It attests to compliance with the Charities Governance Code and publishes audited annual accounts with the Charities Regulator.

In 2024, Pieta reported income of €13.68 million, of which €12.6 million (73%) was spent on charitable activities and €4.7 million on fundraising. Statutory funding amounted to €2.79 million, with more than 80% of income generated through donations and fundraising events such as Darkness Into Light. Expenditure totalled €17.29 million, leading to a €3.6 million deficit, which was met by reserves. Year-end reserves stood at €10.7 million, in line with the charity's policy of holding nine months' operating costs.

== Controversies and criticism ==
=== 2012 Pobal audit ===
In 2012, an audit by Pobal, a government agency, noted governance deficiencies at Pieta House. Issues included the use of pre-signed blank cheques, reportedly inadequate control measures for electronic banking, and failure to adhere to public sector procurement rules. These findings led to the repayment of €31,000 in ineligible expenditure.

=== 2018 HSE audit ===
A 2018 Health Service Executive (HSE) audit identified a number of governance deficiencies at Pieta. One major issue identified was the absence of a documented remuneration policy, which raised questions about the transparency and accountability of salary allocations. The audit also revealed that salary increases awarded to the then-CEO and senior staff in 2017 were not formally discussed or approved, as evidenced by the absence of these decisions in board meeting minutes. Furthermore, Pieta failed to provide the HSE with a required complaints report, a critical oversight that left the HSE uninformed about any complaints lodged against the charity. In addition, the audit noted inadequate performance monitoring, including failures to centralise essential documents such as tax clearance certifications and insurance policies. The audit said the charity had 15 bank accounts with a total balance of €4.6m at December 31, 2017.

The HSE audit found the charity recorded 38 foreign trips between 2014 and 2017 but had no policy governing foreign travel. Twenty-two of the overseas trips were connected to Darkness Into Light. The charity did not provide auditors with evidence of prior approval of foreign travel or full financial and travel records.

The report also noted concerns that the charity had not renewed Garda vetting for several staff members over a number of years. In one case, a counsellor was appointed before Garda clearance was obtained. When the vetting was eventually completed, there was a record which warranted the employee being interviewed by the HR manager.

The audit also highlighted issues with invoices submitted by therapists contracted to provide counselling sessions for Pieta. A review of invoices from 22 therapists revealed that some payments had been processed without proper approval. And, in four cases, there were discrepancies between appointment records and the corresponding invoices. The audit also noted that one staff member was responsible for collecting donations, drawing up receipts, and depositing funds in the charity's bank account, which could lead to irregularities going unnoticed.

There were also no signatures on the CEO's or any other credit card statements evidencing that expenditure was authorised, and no evidence of a board decision to increase credit card limits from €5,000 to €15,000.

=== Leadership and pay ===
The 2018 HSE audit found that the CEO received a 12% pay increase, significantly higher than the 5% rise given to other staff, and raised concerns about how this was handled. While the organisation stated that the increase had been approved by its board, the auditors found no record of this approval in the board minutes. More broadly, the audit criticised the lack of proper documentation and formal governance around salary decisions, noting that there was no clear remuneration policy in place for senior management. The audit recommended that future pay decisions be formally approved and clearly recorded. While Pieta disputed the audit's findings on the lack of documentation surrounding the CEO's pay increase, describing them as "incorrect, unfair, and should be removed", the HSE audit team maintained its position, stating that the charity had not supplied evidence to refute the conclusions.

In 2015, the charity's founder and former senator, Joan Freeman, was appointed to an ambassadorial role, reporting directly to Pieta's board. However, the 2018 HSE audit noted governance lapses surrounding this position. The report found that Pieta management were not fully informed about the ambassador's activities, and her contract and job description were not included in her staff personnel file.

In 2021, questions were also raised about senior salary levels at the charity. Following staff layoffs during the Covid pandemic, the top six earners' combined salaries exceeded €500,000 per annum, with the CEO paid €120,000, rising to nearly €150,000 with benefits. Sinn Féin's Mark Ward TD said the salaries were in striking contrast with front-line therapists only receiving €25,000 per year. He also noted the charity would pay €420,000 in redundancies that year while already running at a loss pre-Covid.

=== HSE recommendations (2020) ===
The HSE's National Office for Suicide Prevention recommended that the board of Pieta put in place a comprehensive review of its structure and operations to develop a sustainable model, after analysis of its financial standing revealed a significant financial gap. The charity had recorded losses of over €710,000 in 2019 even before Covid hit.
