= Darkness into Light =

Annual fundraiser for Pieta House

Darkness into Light is an annual walking event and fundraiser held, primarily, across the island of Ireland. Founded in 2009 by psychologist Joan Freeman as a fundraiser in the Phoenix Park for Pieta House suicide prevention and counselling, 400 attended the first event while the 2017 event was attended by an estimated 150,000 participants at more than 150 locations. Similar events occur in Australia and New Zealand, Asia and North America.

== Goal and operation ==
The Darkness into Light event is a fundraiser for Pieta House, a charity which provides counselling to anyone struggling with suicide or for anyone impacted by suicide.

The event involves participants, who typically seek sponsorship to fundraise for the charity, to meet before dawn (4:15am) on a particular Saturday in May and walk or run for 5 km to meet the sunrise. From its inauguration in Dublin in 2009, which involved 400 participants, by 2018 the fundraising event had grown to include over 200,000 participants at 150 locations in 19 countries.

Electric Ireland has sponsored Darkness into Light since 2013. The utility company has also helped promote and raise awareness for Pieta House.

== Other events ==
A similar event held in the United States, known as the "Out of the Darkness Walk", is run by the American Foundation for Suicide Prevention. Beginning in 2004, the US event is a community walk that takes place in towns across the country. Similar to the Darkness into Light Walk, it is a walking fundraiser where participants walk-side-by-side in support of one another. The goal of this event is to bring more awareness to mental health, fight suicide and also remember loved ones lost to suicide.
