= Console (charity) =

Irish charity

Console was a charity that offered suicide support services in Ireland and the UK. The charity was wound down in 2016 due to financial irregularities. The Irish Charities Regulator was given additional powers in the same year. In 2020, the charity's founder, Paul Kelly, took his own life as he was reportedly facing impending criminal charges relating to theft from the charity.

== Formation and operation ==
In 2002, Paul Kelly founded Console, saying it was in response to the suicide of his sister Sharon. While he stated that she had died in 2001, she had actually died by suicide in 1995. Former president Mary McAleese became a patron of the charity.

The charity, which offered a suicide helpline, suicide bereavement liaison service and suicide bereavement counselling service, opened facilities in Galway and Limerick during 2007.

In 2009, Console and the suicide prevention charity 3Ts, set up by Noel Smyth, established the 1Life 24 hour helpline. Smyth provided over €500,000 worth of infrastructure and Console provided the staff. Shortly afterwards, Console set up its own helpline, funded by the Health Service Executive. This put the two helplines in competition, leading to the closure of the 1Life line after Console withdrew staff.

Paul Kelly received a Princess Grace Humanitarian Award in Monaco in 2008 and a People of the Year Award in 2014. He also received an award from the Labour Party in the House of Commons of the United Kingdom.

Console expanded into the United Kingdom, providing counselling in London from rooms donated by family of Gary Speed. Michael Owen, Alan Shearer and Gordon Strachan among others, helped finance the rooms through charity golf days. The rooms were launched by Rachael Heyhoe Flint.

== HSE internal audit ==
In an audit undertaken by the HSE in 2015, all findings were ranked as "high", indicating there was "a significant risk of substantial financial loss, and/or of accounting error, and/or of major non-compliance with policies or regulations and requires immediate action". The HSE also noted the auditors had difficulties in getting access to records held by Console and had a lack of cooperation from the charity.

== Liquidation ==
In June 2016, the RTÉ current affairs program Prime Time ran an exposé on the issues with the charity. Three weeks later, in July 2016, the Irish High Court appointed a liquidator for Console, after it heard that the charity was €294,000 in debt and could no longer provide services to people affected by suicide. Campaigner David Hall was appointed interim CEO during the winding-down process, and the services provided by Console were taken over by Pieta House. Following the events at Console, the Charities Regulator in Ireland "gained extra powers under the Charities Act".

== Reporting ==
At the time of the Console's closure, it was reported that the charity's chief executive, Paul Kelly (together with his wife Patricia and son Tim), had "run up credit card bills of almost €500,000 on items such as groceries, designer clothes and foreign trips".

It was also reported that Paul Kelly had a history of fraud and had impersonated a doctor at Baggot Street Hospital for three weeks until the Garda Síochána were informed. He pleaded guilty in the Dublin District Court in June 1983.

In 1986, Kelly set up Christian Development Services, an organisation that advertised itself as counselling people with issues ranging from marital problems to sexual abuse. He did not have counselling qualifications, nor did many of those doing counselling work for the organisation. In fundraising for the organisation, Kelly reportedly claimed to be a priest (when he was not one) and falsely stated that prominent figures such as Valerie Goulding and Bertie Ahern were trustees of the organisation. Suspicions arose that he was defrauding the organisation and in December 1989 the board of directors forced him to resign as director and employee, alleging he had "misappropriated funds". Kelly later established a short-lived charity called Community Care and continued to falsely claim to be a priest while raising funds for them.

It was reported that, in documents sent to the Companies Registration Office, his wife was listed on Console's board as Patricia Kelly, but in accounts sent to state agencies seeking grants she was listed under her maiden name, Patricia Dowling. A board consisting of relatives is considered a red flag. His sister Joan McKenna was also listed as on the board, reportedly without her knowledge.

== Investigation and outcomes ==
As of 2020, while the Office of the Director of Corporate Enforcement had opened an investigation into the issues with the charity and its operation, no charges had been brought against any individuals at that time.

The charity's founder, Paul Kelly, died in 2020. According to reporting by RTÉ, he "took his own life as he was facing imminent criminal charges relating to his theft from the charity".

In 2024, Patricia Kelly pleaded guilty to "failing to keep the books of account as a director of the company" for which she was fined €1,500.
