= Marie Keating Foundation =

Irish cancer charity

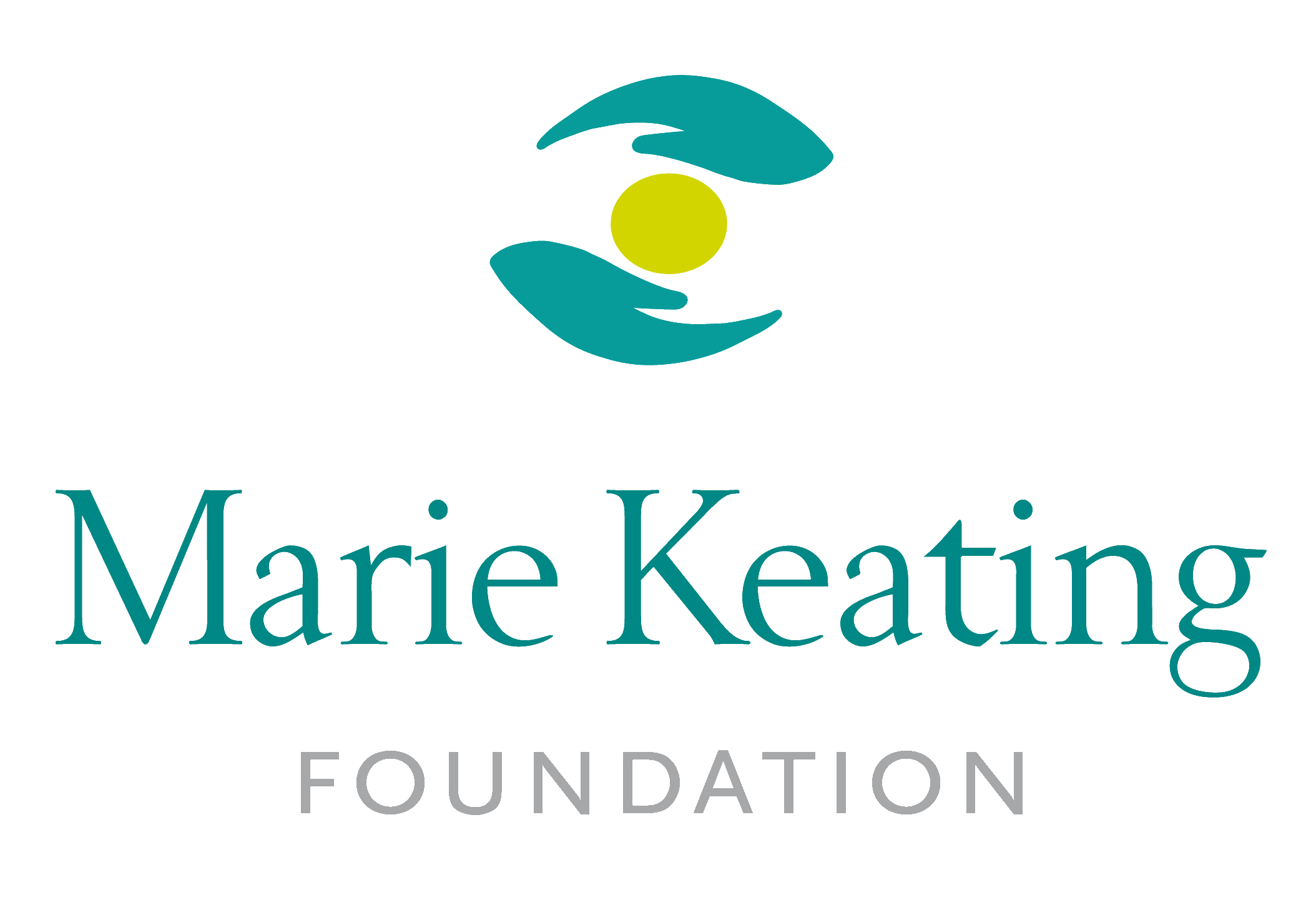
- The current logo, in use since 2001
- Named after: Marie Keating, a woman who died of breast cancer in 1998
- Formation: May 4, 2001; 24 years ago
- Founder: Keating family
- Registration no.: 342695
- Purpose: To make cancer less frightening by enlightening
- Headquarters: Millbank Business Park
- Location: Lucan, Dublin, Ireland
- Coordinates: 53°21′42.502″N 6°26′35.952″W
- Board of directors: Michael O’Reilly; Patricia Lawlor; Mark Culleton; Mark Grehan; Marie Claire Scullion; Marie McGinley; Laura Larkin; Kathy O'Donnell; Barbara O'Reilly; Prof. Ron Grainger
- Key people: Liz Yeates (CEO); Linda Keating (Fundraising)
- Website: mariekeating.ie

The Marie Keating Foundation is an Irish foundation focused on raising the awareness of cancer, and the importance of early detection and providing a range of support services for patients at every step of a cancer journey. The charity was founded in 2001 by the Keating family including Marie's son Ronan Keating, and is one of the largest national cancer charities in Ireland.

The charity receives very little Government funding and relies mainly on fundraising and donations to continue to provide its free cancer support and education services. Initially focussing on breast cancer, the charity organisation has expanded in recent years to cancer information, awareness and support for all forms of cancer for both men and women.

== History and present day ==
=== Marie's cancer diagnosis and death ===
In 1994 Keating experienced breast pain and her doctor diagnosed her with mastitis, providing her with a prescription for antibiotics and telling her to come back if the pain persisted. As she was afraid of hospitals, she did not return for follow-up care even though she was in pain. She discovered a breast lump, and her doctor immediately sent her to Beaumont Hospital in the north of Dublin city for a biopsy where she was told that it was cancer even before tests were run. Over a year and a half later, on 25 September 1996, Marie was diagnosed with Paget's disease of the breast which developed into breast cancer as it was not detected early enough. Although this was a shock to both her and her family, she underwent a full mastectomy the following month and began chemotherapy treatment. A year later, in September 1997, she was told that the cancer had gone but, because she rarely did her exercises, she developed lymphedema in her legs, and in the following month, she began to experience back pain and returned to hospital. An MRI scan revealed that she had cancer along her spinal cord so she began radiotherapy which she had completed in January 1998. On 2 February 1998, Marie Keating died from breast cancer which had spread to various parts of her body, aged 51.

=== Marie Keating Foundation ===
After her death, the charity was founded in her memory by her family including daughter Linda, sons, Ronan, Gary, Gerard, Ciaran and her husband Gerry, in 1998 initially giving advice and support to those diagnosed with breast cancer. As it grew, it has expanded to cancer information, awareness and support services for all forms of cancer for both men and women. It was registered on 4 May 2001.
