= Miriam O'Regan =

Irish barrister, High Court judge since 2016

The Hon. Ms. Justice Miriam O'Regan

Judge of the High Court
- Incumbent
- Assumed office 26 January 2016
- Nominated by: Government of Ireland
- Appointed by: Michael D. Higgins

Personal details
- Education: University College Cork; King's Inns

Miriam O'Regan is an Irish judge who has served as a Judge of the High Court since January 2016.

== Early life and career ==
O'Regan was educated at University College Cork and the King's Inns. She was called to the Bar in 1983 and became a senior counsel in 2014.

Her practice was predominantly based in Cork. She had experience in the law of property and probate, and in family and commercial law. She has acted in several cases where other parties have engaged in contempt of court. She appeared for a complainant at the Commission to Inquire into Child Abuse.

From 1989, she was court counsel for the city and county of Cork.

== Judicial career ==
=== High Court ===
She became a High Court judge in January 2016. She has heard cases involving property law, personal injuries, judicial review, insolvency, extradition, injunctions, and defamation.

She has presided over a defamation dispute involving Declan Ganley, Denis O'Brien and Red Flag Consulting. Her experience of other high-profile actions includes the bankruptcy of Seán Dunne, contempt of court by the Irish Independent, and an action against Rihanna, who was accused of uttering malicious falsehoods.

She made a reference to the European Court of Justice in 2019 regarding an environmental law case.

In 2018, she was one of the judges present for the opening of redevelopment of the courthouse in Cork.
