= Old Man Belfield =

Irish homeless figure associated with University College Dublin (1949–2021)

- Born: Michael Byrne; 10 January 1949
- Died: 10 or 11 January 2021 (aged 72); University College Dublin campus, Belfield, Dublin 4, Ireland

Michael Byrne, affectionately known as Old Man Belfield (10 January 1949 – 10/11 January 2021), was a homeless man who lived for over 30 years on the campus of University College Dublin (UCD) in Dublin, Ireland leading a "fiercely private" hermitic existence, during which he rarely spoke to anyone. Despite his self-isolation, he came to be "loved and respected by generations of students and staff" alike, was accepted as "part of the UCD community", and "touched people in ways he may not have known". After his death, the 'Michael Byrne Community Fund' was established in his memory, which provides accommodation bursaries to students of the university who may not have been able to afford accommodation otherwise.

It is unknown at what point Byrne became homeless, but it is known that by the late 1970s/early 1980s he was already sleeping rough on a "vacant plot of land" on Merrion Road, and was forced to relocate when construction eventually began on the same plot. Since that point until his death, he habitually slept rough, and often on the UCD campus. In his latter years, he slept in a dwelling compared to a "bunker" in a quiet corner of the UCD grounds, where he died in January 2021 from a heart attack in the midst of the COVID-19 pandemic.

As a quiet individual who didn't drink, Byrne was not seen as an overt nuisance on campus, and even came to be regarded as somewhat of a "silent guardian" figure, who had, according to staff member Aoibhinn Ní Shúilleabháin, a "lovely quietness about him... (and a) kind of calm that just surrounded him". Ní Shúilleabháin had also attended UCD as a student, during which she became aware of Byrne. His guardianly presence was further bolstered by an incident one night in the early 1990s in which he saved a female student from assault (or worse) at the hands of an unknown male assailant.

During his lifetime, rumours circulated that perhaps Byrne "was a retired lecturer, (or) a student who had dropped out of college", but in reality neither were the case. Ní Shúilleabháin recalled that during her time on campus in the early 2000s, a story circulated that the reason "everyone was so nice to him" was because he had once "saved a girl from being raped". Ní Shúilleabháin understood this at the time to have been an urban myth, but noted that "whether or not that happened, everybody was just nice to him anyways".

Shortly after Byrne's death, UCD announced his passing via their official Twitter channel, which resulted in a response, the scale of which had not been seen before in the experience of Eilis O'Brien, a writer for the alumni magazine UCD Connections. Within 11 hours of the message being tweeted, it had been shared "with tens of thousands of students, graduates with messages of genuine sadness and personal tribute pouring in."

RTÉ (Ireland's public service broadcaster) noted that Byrne had had "an enormous impact" on the lives of "tens of thousands of people", and, according to The Irish Independent, was "held in high regard by students and staff" alike. A UCD law professor musing on Byrne's life opined that for an individual "who didn't really play a role in the academic part of the university, (he) left an abiding memory, I think, that will probably outlive the memory of most of us who actually do take part in the academic life of the university."

== Early life ==
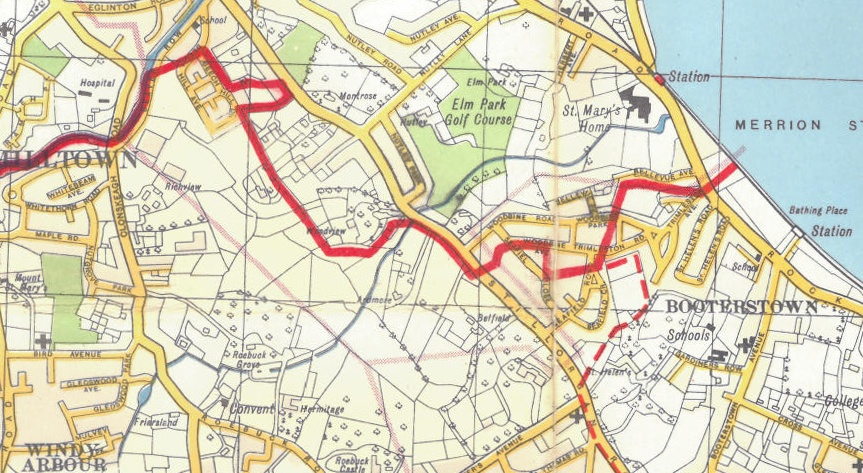
A map of the Belfield area of Dublin and surrounds, about which Byrne spent much of his adult life "quietly roaming"

Little is known of Byrne's early life. In 2022, documentary maker Donal O'Herlihy attempted to uncover this in an RTÉ Radio 1 documentary entitled "Old Man Belfield", in which he posthumously attempted to track down the details of his birth and the family he had come from.

By using Byrne's PPSN (the Irish government's unique identifier of individuals in the country), which Byrne had previously entrusted to long-standing acquaintance Stephen McCarthy in order for him to collect his pension on his behalf, O'Herlihy, with the help of genealogist Damien O'Sullivan, was able to confirm his birth name and date of birth.

Armed with these details, O'Herlihy and O'Sullivan visited Ireland's General Register Office in Dublin to retrieve Byrne's birth certificate on which it was hoped would be written his place of birth, and the names of one, if not both, parents. They viewed records for 16 separate "Michael Byrnes", all born in 1949 in Ireland, but none bore the exact same birth date as the Michael Byrne of Belfield. Records from the English, Welsh, Scottish and Northern Irish register offices were also consulted but also proved fruitless.

Miriam McCarthy, a volunteer worker with Dublin's Simon Community first encountered Byrne through her work in the 1970s. At that stage, Byrne was already homeless and living on "a bit of waste land" opposite St. Vincent's University Hospital, where the Merrion shopping centre was subsequently built. Miriam approached Byrne with offers of help, but her attempts at conversation were always met with silence. "As the weeks went on, she brought food and hot drinks to his makeshift hut, but quickly realised that he was deeply private and independent" and so kept watch from a distance, according to The Sunday Independent. As the developers moved in, Byrne moved up along Nutley Lane in the direction of UCD in search of a new dwelling place. Miriam McCarthy "was always involved" with Byrne, according to her son Stephen, "in getting him whatever facilities he needed, be it sleeping bags, food, making sure the soup run at night were in touch with him - she was his coordinator and would have collected his 'few bob' (pension) each week".

Eventually Byrne began trusting Miriam enough to visit the family home, where herself and her husband Seán "organised that he would sign on for his pension each week and have a fry up before leaving". Thenceforth, Byrne would visit the home every Thursday, the day the pensions were distributed. During his visits, Miriam would typically share a cup of tea with the man, and try to engage him in conversation, but according to Stephen:

"...he never, ever spoke... the man never, ever spoke. There are witnesses to this, out of the family, the McCarthy family. He never said a word to anybody [..] Michael was a man who didn't approach anybody, and very few people approached Michael, and if they did they got a wink and a nod, and a smile."

Delivering the eulogy at Byrne's funeral in 2021, Stephen McCarthy recounted that his mother had nicknamed Byrne "the Dreamer", as "she had assumed that all he did all day was dream, and that (it) got him through his day... and maybe that's the way it was". Stephen recalled that his parents "were of the opinion that he might have had some medical treatment that might have affected his speech or that something might have happened in his earlier life" which left him mute.

== UCD years ==
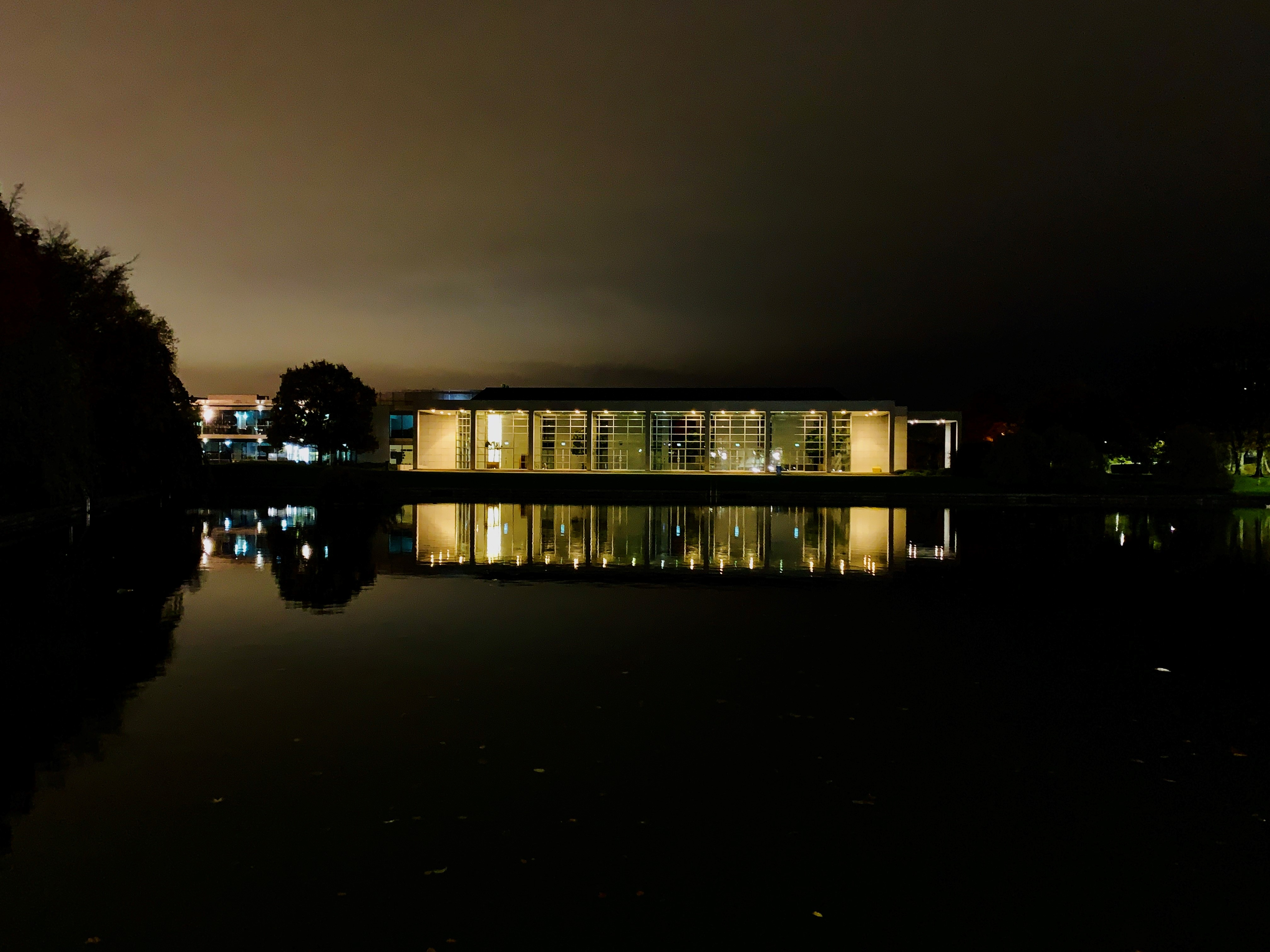
The O'Reilly Hall at night in UCD

Speaking to the College Tribune, UCD's student newspaper, in 2021, former Arts student Gisèle Scanlon recounted that on a "wet and windy" night in the early 1990s, she had been helped by Byrne in fending off a would-be attacker along an under-lit walkway on campus. As the College Tribune recounted:

"...(walking) through the dark and unpopulated area, Scanlon was attacked by a tall and dark-haired man. "This guy just came out of nowhere," she says. "He kind of wrapped his arms around my chest [and] just dragged me to the ground […] like a rugby tackle." She originally thought it was somebody she knew who was messing about, but soon realised her fears as this stranger tried to assault her". Byrne suddenly appeared and dragged the man off Scanlon, throwing him to the side, and helped her up...

Byrne did not speak at all during the encounter, after which the attacker fled. Many years later in 2018, Scanlon had the opportunity to personally thank Byrne for his help, when she bumped into him not far from Belfield, at a bus stop in Donnybrook. He reportedly smiled and said in a "very pronounced Dublin accent", "similar to Ronnie Drew of The Dubliners": "There's no need to be saying anything like that. These things happen." In the 2022 RTÉ documentary, Scanlon recounted that Byrne's words had been "Anyone would have done it, that's the way life is."

After Miriam McCarthy died in 1996, her husband Seán continued to assist Byrne, collecting his disability pension for him on his behalf. In 2014, Seán moved to a nursing home and from thenceforth their son Stephen (Steve) McCarthy took on the handling of Byrne's affairs, becoming his agent as well as his designated next-of-kin. Byrne remained homeless throughout, predominantly dwelling on the grounds of UCD.

Following the year 2014, Byrne was still in the habit of visiting the McCarthy family home on occasion, if only to collect his pension, as Stephen recounted to RTÉ:

"Basically, I would collect his pension and ensure Michael would get his few bob every week. My brother David continued to live in the family home for a period and Michael would call religiously every Thursday. Michael continued to live a very quiet life and was well known in the area. The restaurant on campus would look after Michael every other day and the local Spar shop also looked after Michael. But at night Michael bedded down in a very lonely spot in UCD".

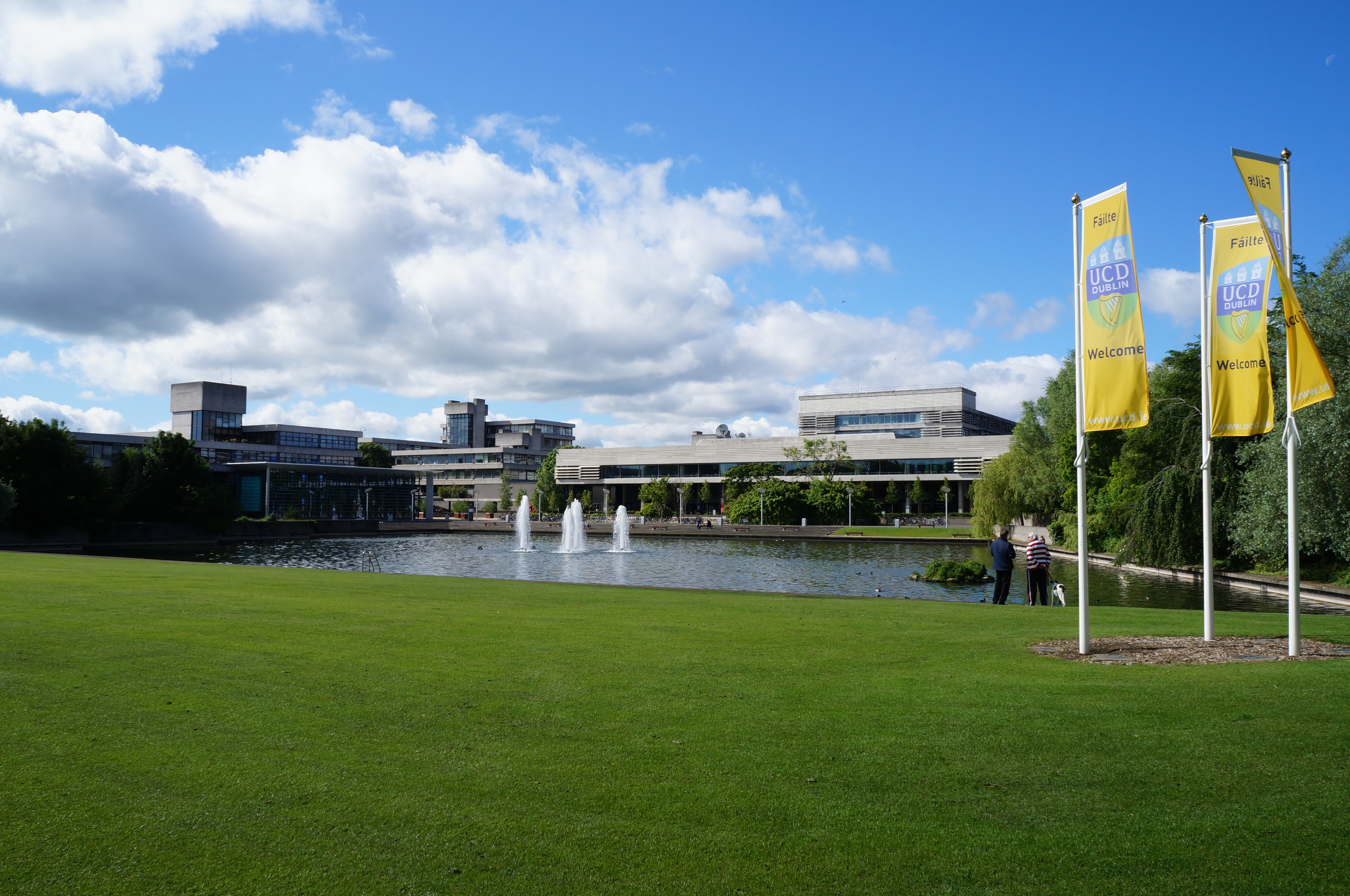
The lake at UCD

Byrne was cared for by a "huge cadre of people", according to RTÉ, consisting mainly of the students and staff at UCD. "He was fed and watered by the canteens on campus and when he wandered the streets of the neighbouring estates he was looked after, especially by the Spar in Woodbine just across the road from UCD". Byrne had a preference for breakfast rolls made using certain ingredients, "which the staff had learned by heart".

In 2014, the Instagram page Humans of Dublin featured Byrne on its page.

Eilis O'Brien, writing in UCD Connections, reminisced about Byrne's ubiquitous presence on campus:

"For over 30 years Michael lived in quiet corners of the UCD campus. His footsteps are ingrained in the paths of Woodbine, Nutley and Greenfield, across the N11 flyover into the campus, through the front gates, up the main avenue, by the side of the lake, and along the Oak Walk – settling behind Conway when the weather was poor and over by Rosemount when it was warm. He slipped into buildings, strolled through the science atrium – to the surprise of visiting academics attending conferences. He was a regular in the restaurant, the SU shop, and at other eateries and cafés where he was given his meals or cups of tea and sat amongst the students. His quiet calmness seemed to spread to the students – osmosis-like. Everyone knew Old Man Belfield – or felt that they did".

Ní Shúilleabháin, then a professor in the School of Maths at the university, recounted that Byrne was partial to sitting on the ground floor of the physics building, which was "home for him", and over the years if there had been a tea or coffee social event in the faculty, the lecturers would invite him to join them.

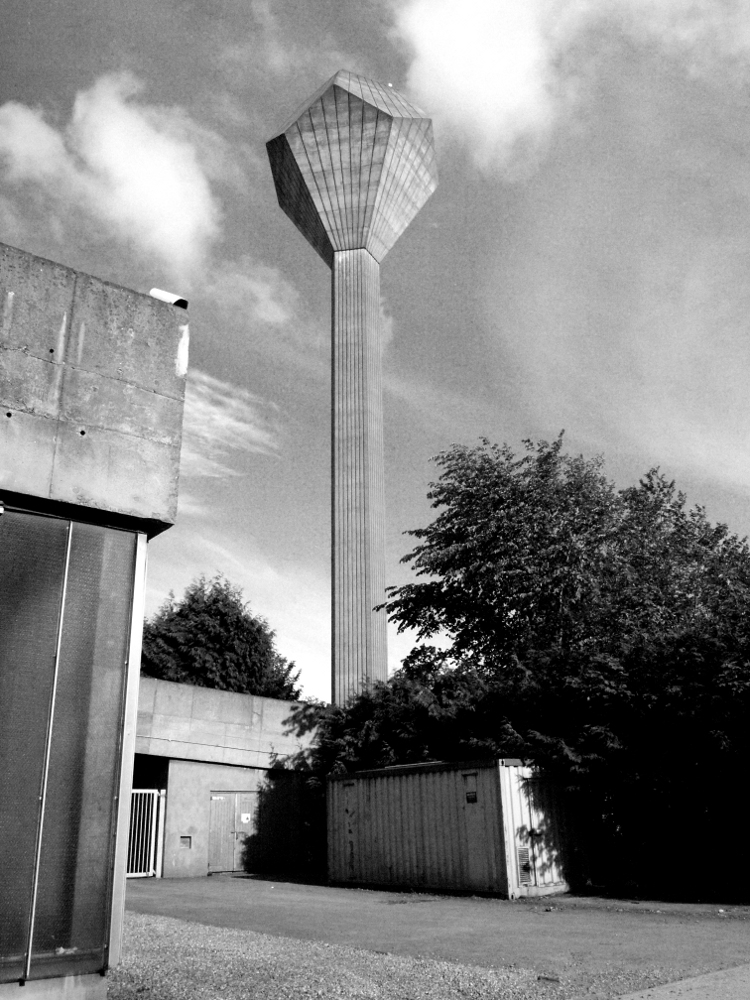
The water tower at UCD

Byrne's sleeping habits were described thus by Stephen McCarthy:

"Very few people knew where Michael slept as he was always very careful no-one spotted him going to his bunker. Occasionally I would drop up to Michael at night just to be sure everything was ok. On cold nights we would drop off sleeping bags, a sandwich and a cup of tea... Michael's only vice in life were the cigarettes. He never drank. But more importantly Michael never spoke. As they say he was a man of few words".

At one point, Byrne was offered a home by Dublin Corporation, behind the Tara Towers hotel in Booterstown, but turned it down, preferring to continue living the life he had by that point known for decades. In the snow of 2017, a doctor came to the door of the McCarthy household to enquire about Byrne's wellbeing, and the two went in search, and eventually found that "UCD had opened a room for him and left him out coffee and biscuits each day and that's how he got through that period".

The Irish Independent noted that for the 72 years that made up his life, he had lived outdoors for at least 50 of them. Despite his age, Byrne continued to sleep rough on campus into his 70s.

UCD administration, as well as security, "kept a watchful eye over Michael", making sure he was safe during inclement weather and protecting him "from being pushed out of the area", according to an article published in the College Tribune in November 2020, shortly before he died.

=== Personality ===
Steve McCarthy described Byrne's manner thus: "He was a man of dignity. A very quiet man. He lived his life very quietly, he never upset anybody. In his eulogy, McCarthy added that "Michael led a long and simple life - never complex, always with good and honest intentions".

The only time McCarthy ever saw Michael get agitated was when the social services arrived at the family home one day and "explained to him that they had social housing ready for him behind Tara Towers... he became very agitated and just mumbled his only two words - one began with 'F' and the other with 'O'".

Byrne almost never talked to anybody, and was largely regarded as non-verbal, although Gisèle Scanlon noted that he did speak to her briefly in 2018 after she thanked him at the bus stop for helping her in the 1990s.

Byrne was noted for the kindness of his eyes, with one student remarking to The Sunday Independent how his "warm blue eyes and his quiet look away were caught somewhere between respect and disinterest".

==== Monetary aid and assistance ====
RTÉ broadcaster Eoghan McDermott noted that "Michael used to hang out on the grounds of RTÉ a lot too, the canteen staff always looked after him". RTÉ noted that "money rarely changed hands with any of those who fed Michael but he did pay for his cigarettes. As a non-drinker, it was his only flaw". He smoked John Player Blue cigarettes.

As the COVID-19 pandemic began to affect vulnerable parts of Irish society from March 2020 onwards, the College Tribune reassured its readers in November 2020 that Byrne had "a sort of informal network" of support around him, with local shopkeepers and groups such as Focus Ireland checking in on him from time to time, and that he had declined help many times.

Rory Mulhall, a stone contractor who worked in UCD for 20 years, described regular encounters he had with Mr Byrne: "I used to be in there early in the morning. I would have given him sandwiches. More times than not he wouldn't take anything off you. He would take a cigarette off you though". He added "The very odd time he would take a sandwich. Of all the years I was around there, I never heard him utter a word. He always steered himself away from people. He is a fascinating man to have kept it all in for so long. I know loads of people in or around UCD and I don't know anyone who he ever spoke to."

== Death ==
Stephen McCarthy recounts that in the 6 months to a year prior to his death, Byrne had gotten "very, very slow", and when McCarthy was phoned with the news that Byrne had died, he "...wasn't expecting it, but in a funny sort of way (he) was expecting it".

The November 2020 article in the College Tribune noted that the Students' Union shop staff had indicated that Byrne hadn't "been around much lately", and since the beginning of the COVID-19 pandemic they had presumed he had "likely made shelter elsewhere". One experienced staff member voiced concerns that Byrne may not have been even aware of the ongoing pandemic. The article finished off with a notice informing readers that the campus caretakers had requested that they be notified if anyone had concerns for Byrne's wellbeing.

Michael Byrne, affectionately known as "Old Man Belfield" by students and staff, sadly passed away on Monday 11 January 2021.

A fiercely private person, we thank those of you who quietly looked out for Michael.

We will miss him around the campus.

Ar dheis Dé go raibh a anam.

— UCD's Twitter post of 12 January 2021 in recognition of Byrne's passing

On 11 January 2021, shortly after 12 noon, Byrne was found dead in his usual sleeping place, on the grounds of the UCD campus. He may have died earlier that same day, or possibly the day before, which had been his birthday. A spokesman confirmed that Gardaí had been called to the scene, where he was pronounced dead and the body removed to Dublin city morgue. A post-mortem examination was arranged for the next day, Tuesday 12 January, where it was confirmed he had died of a heart attack.

The Irish Times reported that Mr. Byrne had no known family members and his next of kin, a man who only wanted to be identified as "Sam" in the newspaper, had indicated that he hoped the publicity surrounding Byrne's death might "possibly result in a family member coming forward".

Byrne's death notice was published on RIP.ie on 16 January 2021, containing his funeral details:

"Affectionately known as "Old Man Belfield" by students and staff, Michael sadly passed away on Monday, 11 January 2021 on the campus that was his home for over thirty years. Loved and respected by generations of students and staff and neighbours in Woodbine, Nutley and Greenfield, he will be greatly missed. The (McCarthy) family who watched out for Michael for the past thirty years would like to thank all those who were kind to Michael and who respected his fierce privacy and independence. A private funeral service will take place on Wednesday, 20 January at 11am, streamed live on the UCD YouTube channel with burial immediately afterwards in Kilternan Cemetery Park."

=== Response ===
After the university shared the news of Byrne's death, "thousands of messages" poured in from students, alumni, staff, past and present, and the local community, with each one sharing their "deep affection for this kind and gentle soul who came to affect the lives of so many of us", according to the University College Dublin Foundation. Eilis O'Brien, a writer for UCD Connections, noted in September 2021 that she had "never witnessed a response to the scale of our posting of the sad passing of Michael Byrne" in her 17 years working at the publication. The flag at UCD was flown at half-mast in his honour.

A photograph of Byrne, as well as the title of an article which had been written about him entitled "Enigma of Old Man Belfield" were featured on the front page of The Sunday Independent dated 17 January 2021.

In February 2021, a man took a DNA test to confirm whether he was in fact the son of Byrne, thinking Byrne may have been his missing father.

After his death, Byrne was considered to have possibly been the same Michael Byrne who had disappeared in the late 1970s from Dublin. After DNA and other evidence was assessed, the Gardai reached the conclusion that it had not been the same man.

== Funeral ==
Upon identifying Byrne's body, Steve McCarthy, who had been his next-of-kin and helper for many years, presumed that he would probably be buried in a pauper's grave in Glasnevin cemetery, "and that would be the end of it". However, after seeing the considerable attention his death had attracted, and the "outpouring on social media", Kilternan Cemetery Park as well as Massey Bros funeral directors decided to donate a funeral, burial, plot and headstone free of charge.

Byrne's funeral service took place on 20 January 2021 at UCD's Our Lady Seat of Wisdom Church in Belfield, officiated by Fr Eamonn Bourke. Owing to the interest in the man, the service was live streamed on the official UCD YouTube channel, as COVID-19 restrictions at the time limited the attendance at funerals to just ten people. Fr Bourke stated at the beginning of the service that if restrictions had not been needed, he was sure the church would have been packed to capacity. However, a source indicated that the modest gathering was "what Michael would have wanted".

Steve McCarthy gave a eulogy at the funeral service, which was also attended by some staff from the university including "Gary Smith from UCD Estates, Jimmy Fitzsimons from the restaurant, Denise Byrne and Attracta Bell from the shop and Dolores O'Riordan, Vice-President for Global Engagement". More than 11,000 people reportedly watched the service online.

Byrne's remains were then taken to Kilternan for burial. Rory Mulhall, the manager of the cemetery, noted:

"It is a fitting place because for a guy who lived out in the wild, under the stars and under the trees around UCD, he is going to a place like where he lived, a natural place. Our cemetery is out in the country. It is the same type of landscape."

UCD later wrote that it had been "proud to host Michael's funeral service".

== Legacy ==
In January 2021, UCD was celebrating Belfield's 50th anniversary, and had already arranged with RTÉ to dedicate an episode of Sunday Miscellany, a variety radio programme, to the university. Owing to Byrne's longstanding association with the campus, and his recent death, an item about him was included in the programme. After the broadcast, UCD were "inundated with enquiries about a memorial in his honour".

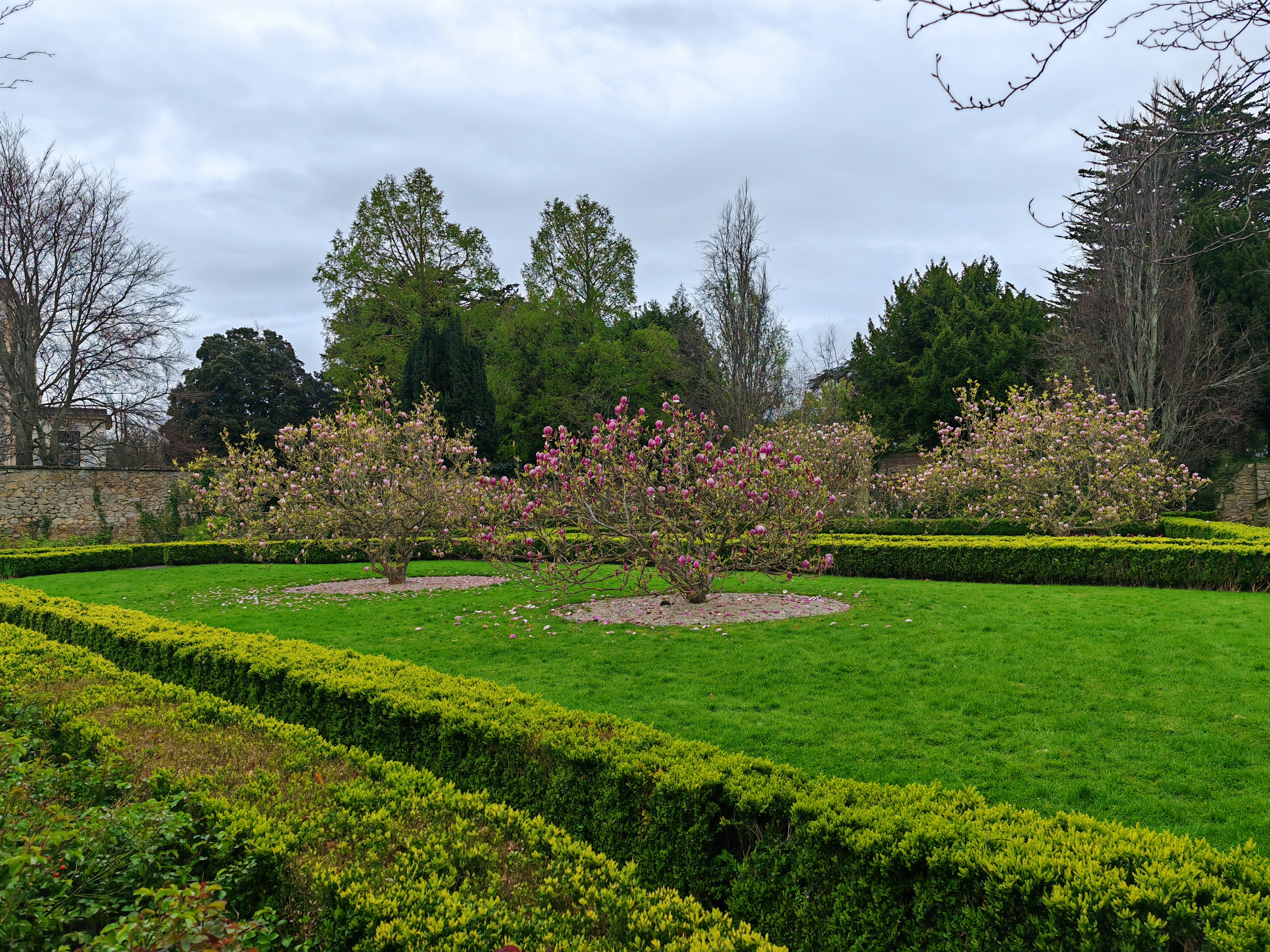
A view of the memorial rose garden at UCD in April 2024

The university eventually decided to commemorate Byrne with a bench in the memorial rose garden situated near Belfield House, which was installed by September 2021, and includes an engraving of his birth name and date of birth. The rose garden had been dedicated some years earlier as a 'memorial garden' in response to the 2015 Berkeley balcony collapse in Berkeley, California, in which three UCD students had died.

The 'Michael Byrne Community Fund' was founded in his memory, which provides accommodation bursaries for students who may not be able to afford accommodation otherwise, and to "foster and recognise community-building activities at the university. The fund also supports Cothrom Na Féinne undergraduate scholarships, as well as 'UCD in the Community' initiatives, and an annual student award".

An event named the 'UCD Michael Byrne Mile' was initiated in 2023, at which attendees can run (or walk) a mile on the UCD running track in memory of the man.

== See also ==
- Homelessness in Ireland
- Matteo (Masahiso) Matubara, colloquially known as "Matt the Jap", a Japanese academic who frequented the grounds of Trinity College Dublin from the 1980s until his death in 2007
- Peter Bergmann case, the mysterious death of an unidentified man in Sligo, Ireland in 2009, whose true identity remains unknown
