= Belfield FM =

Student radio station at University College Dublin

- Belfield, Dublin; Ireland
- Broadcast area: University College Dublin

Programming
- Format: Student Radio

Links
- Webcast: www.belfieldfm.com
- Website: www.belfieldfm.com

Belfield FM is University College Dublin's internet student radio station. The station began broadcasting in 1990. It was initially run as a part of the UCD Students' Union, under the remit of the entertainments office, before becoming an independent entity within the Students' Union (SU). Belfield FM disaffiliated with the SU at the end of the 2011/2012 college year, and is now run independently within the UCD Societies Council framework. The station forms part of UCD's "Student Media Network", along with The University Observer and The College Tribune. The station is run by volunteer staff and contributors, and broadcasts on weekdays.

== Awards ==
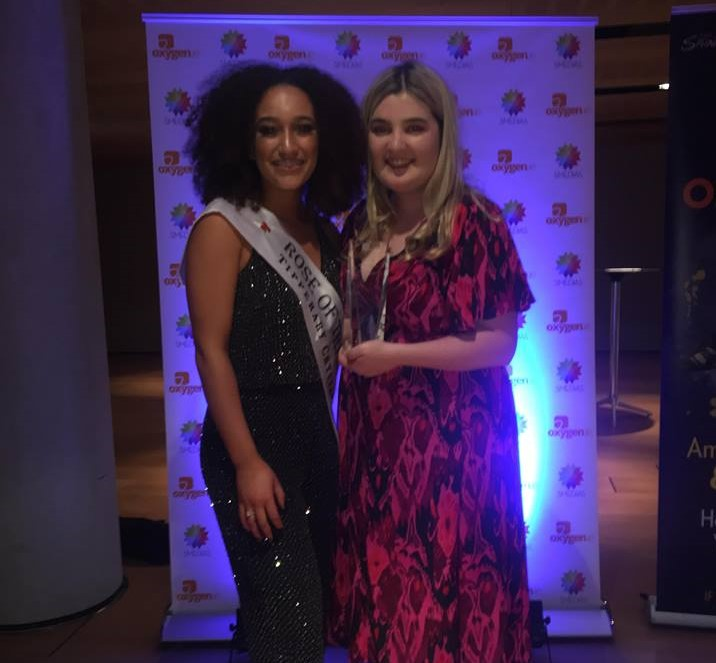
Aisling Grennan's 2019 People's Choice Award

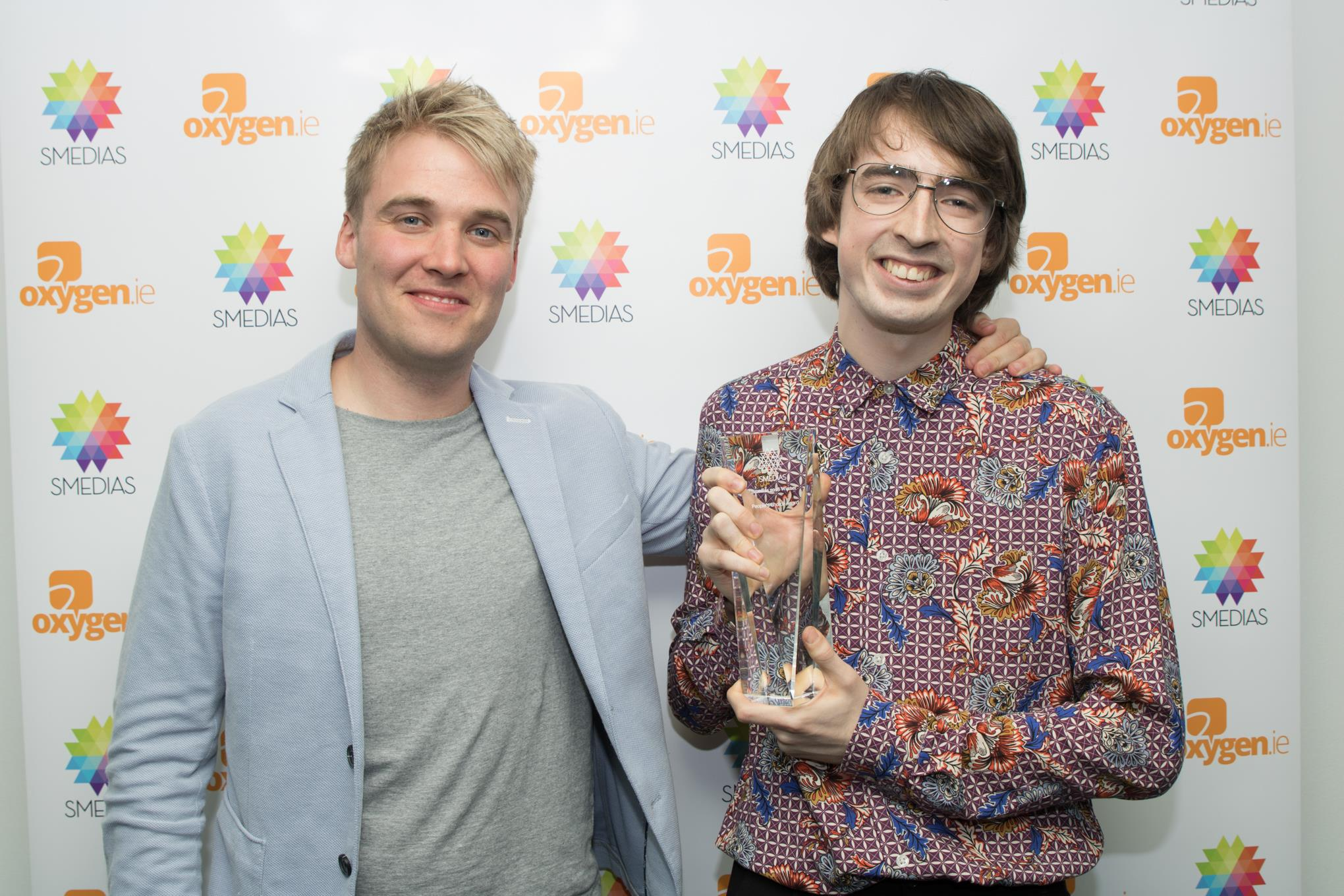
William (Willem) McCartney's 2018 People's Choice Award

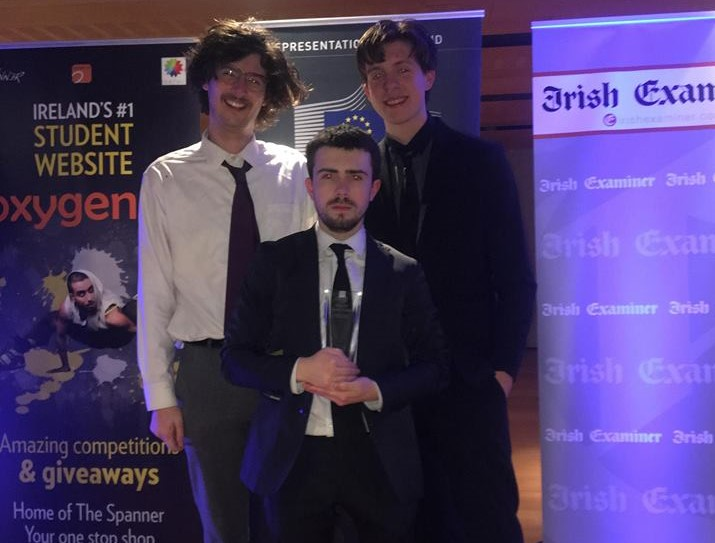
Patrick Power's 2019 Radio Journalist Award alongside documentary collaborators Cian Lyons and Matthew O'Leary

Belfield FM have participated in the National Student Media Awards and have won a number of awards. These included a People's Choice Award for William McCartney in 2018, a Radio Journalist award for Patrick Power in 2019, and a People's Choice Award for Aisling Grennan in 2019.

== Controversies ==
In 2015 the Societies Council temporarily closed the station due to it being unsupervised for lengths of time.

In late 2018, "Keepin' it Country" was criticised by the College Tribune for inappropriate comments regarding named students live on air, and the show's podcasts were subsequently removed. In the subsequent semester of broadcasting, the controversial show was absent from the schedule of programming.

In 2019, the show "Up Late with Dave" featured an interview with John Connors to discuss the travelling community in Ireland. During the interview, comments were made about the directors of Pavee Point which were reportedly described as "defamatory and slanderous". The station later published an apology on their website.
