= Gavan Reilly =

Irish journalist and broadcaster

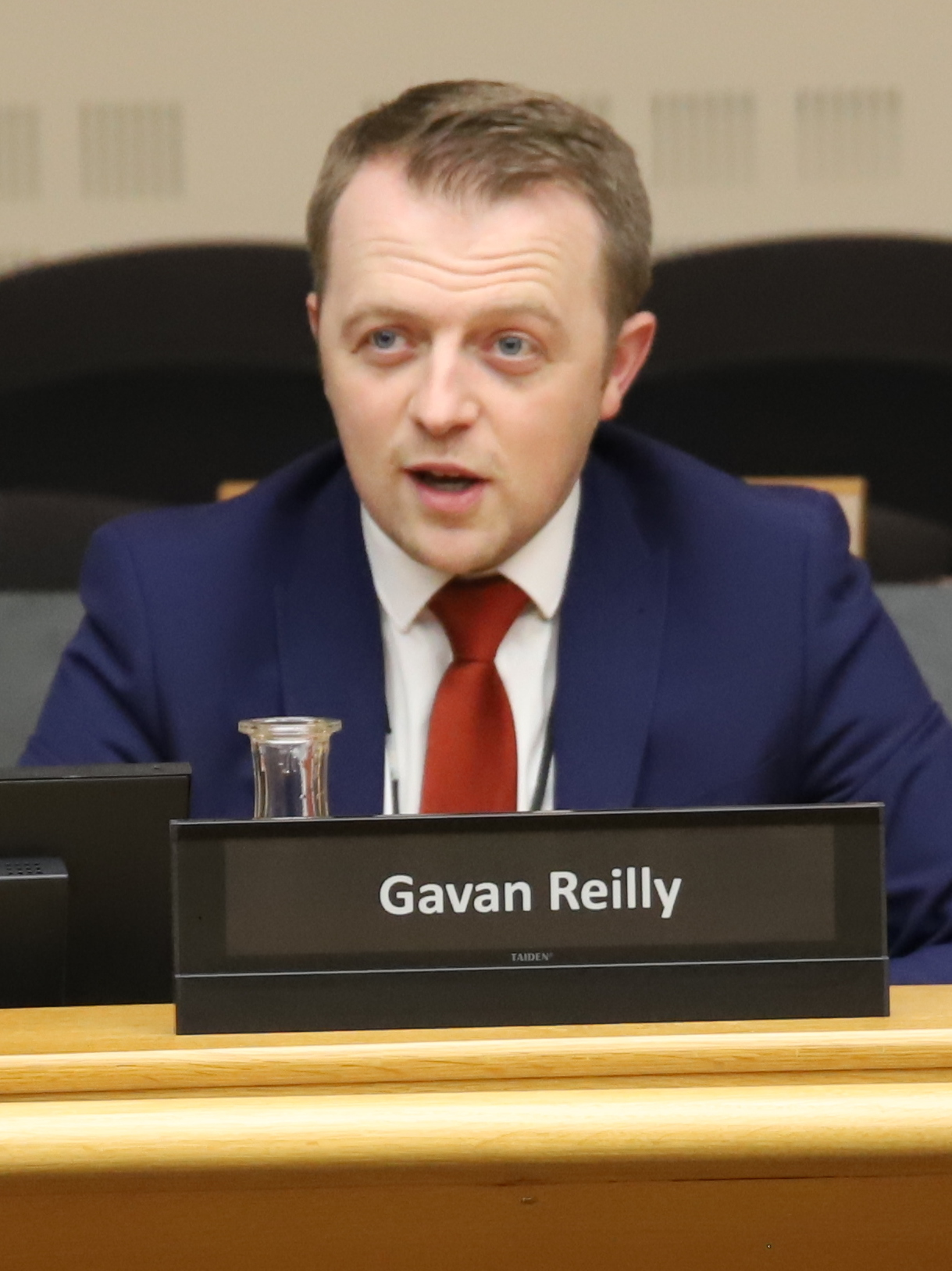
- Reilly in 2023
- Born: 1986 or 1987; Rathmolyon, County Meath, Ireland
- Education: University College Dublin
- Writing career
- Occupation: Journalist

Gavan Reilly (born 1986 or 1987) is an Irish journalist working for Newstalk and Virgin Media One. He previously worked at Today FM and TheJournal.ie.

== Early life ==
Reilly is from Rathmolyon in County Meath attending Kill national school. He is one of two siblings. He is life long fan of Premier League team Manchester United and the Meath GAA. From to 2004 until 2009, Reilly studied at University College Dublin. While there, he was a contributor to The University Observer, a student-run newspaper, as well as Belfield FM, a student-run radio station.

== Career ==
In 2010, Reilly became a staff writer at the news website TheJournal.ie. In 2011 Reilly created Agenda.ie, a website dedicated to covering the schedule and news of Dáil Éireann. In July 2013, Reilly became Today FM's political correspondent. In September 2017 Reilly became the political correspondent for TV3 (which became Virgin Media One in 2018). In 2018 he led UCD Students' Union's Constiutional Review Group, producing a new UCDSU Constitution. In March 2019, while retaining his role at VM1, Reilly began presenting a Sunday morning political news programme on Newstalk. In May 2019, Reilly published Enda the Road: Nine Days that Toppled a Taoiseach, a book on the end of Enda Kenny's time as Taoiseach.
