= Homelessness in Ireland =

Social issue in Ireland

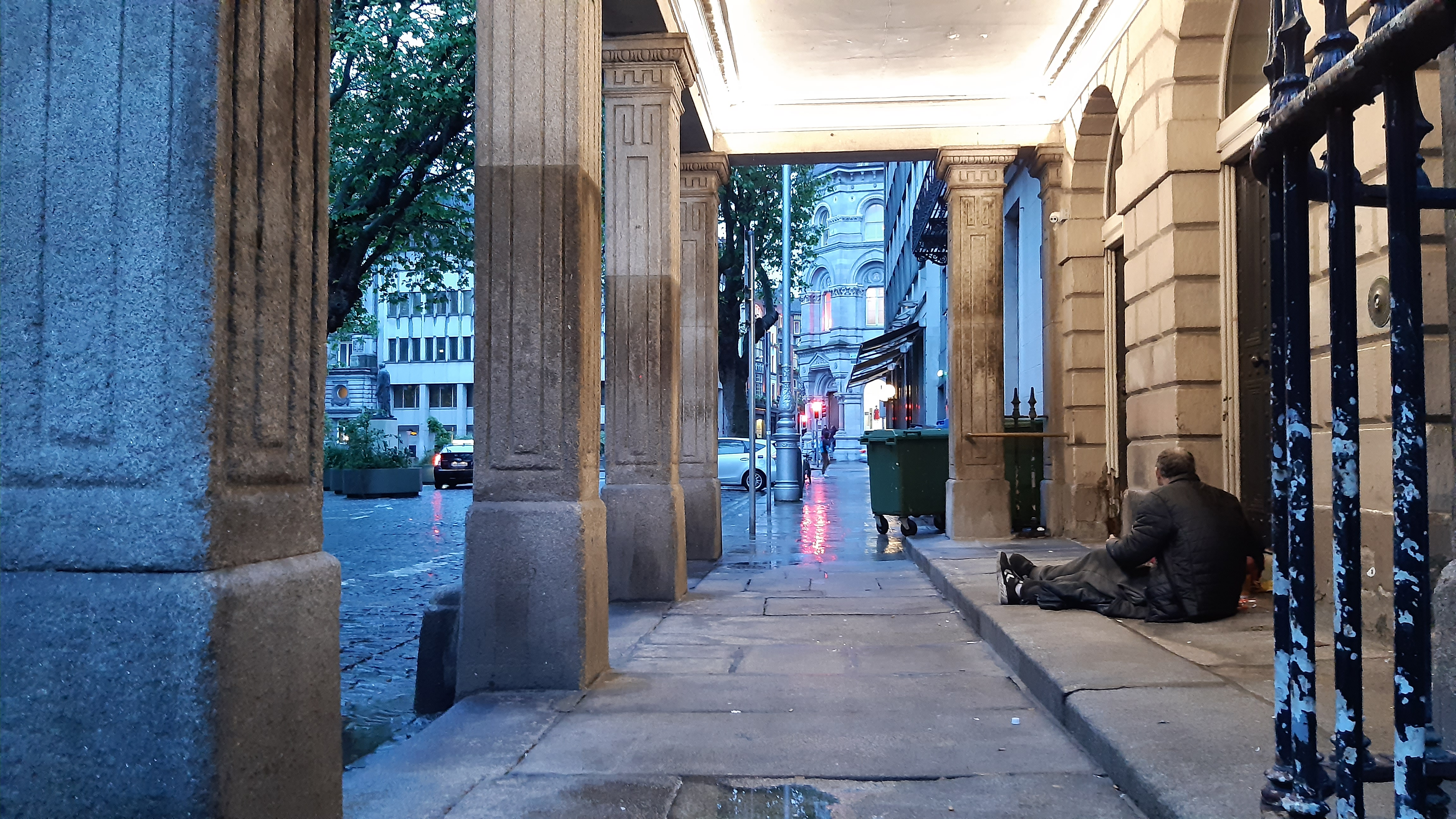
A homeless man sits in the portico of a building in Foster Place, Dublin in 2024

In Ireland, over 17,000 people are homeless as of April 2026, most of whom live in emergency accommodation, and hundreds sleep rough outside. It is an evolving social issue. In 2014, amid rising homelessness numbers, cabinet members began considering it as a national crisis. Despite plans by successive governments to tackle homelessness, numbers continue to rise. According to exit poll data, housing and homelessness was the single biggest issue for voters in the 2024 general election, with 28% considering it a key issue.

== History and background ==
During the 19th century, homelessness was a pervasive impact of the Great Famine (1845–1852). During the 20th century, homelessness in Ireland was associated with older males who may have had addiction or alcoholism issues. However, since the 1990s and into the 21st century, it has been recognised that the homeless population includes increasing numbers of women and children. Commentators have attributed the ongoing events (described in the news media as the 'homelessness crisis') to the post-2008 Irish economic downturn and 'subsequent fiscal adjustments', and the parallel impacts of reduced familial incomes, mortgage arrears and rental increases which followed impacts to housing supply.

== Statistics ==
=== Numbers of homeless people ===
In 2013, spokespersons of the Irish government stated that they would have "eradicated homelessness" in Ireland by 2016. However, this goal was not achieved. Rather, by 2017, the issue and prevalence of homelessness had increased, with the number of homeless people in Ireland rising by 25% between September 2016 and September 2017. Figures published during 2016 and early 2017 indicated that there were then 4,377 people living in emergency accommodation, the highest figure seen in Ireland to that date. By mid-2019 this had increased further, with figures indicating that more than 10,000 people were homeless in Ireland, with approximately one-third of these being children. As of February 2021, there were reportedly 8,313 homeless people in Ireland (of which 5,987 were adults and 2,326 children). In 2021, 115 homeless people died in Dublin.

=== Subcategories ===
A "Homelessness Report" by the Department of Housing, Planning, Community and Local Government in November 2016 indicated that while there were hundreds of homeless families and individuals in other regions, the issue was most prevalent in the Dublin area. As of February 2021, approximately 70% of homeless people were in Dublin.

Youth homelessness is often defined as a separate issue to homelessness. Though the issue was not recognized by government until the late 1980s, since the mid-1960s youth homelessness was gradually articulated as a form of homelessness different from that experienced by adults. More than 5,500 children live in emergency accommodation as of April 2026.

The housing ministry's figures do not include the "hidden homeless" such as people who are couch surfing or sleeping in their cars. While studies are experimental and limited, 1,249 people were identified under certain categories of hidden homelessness.

== In the arts ==
- Irish folk-punk singer Jinx Lennon included a song about homelessness on his 2020 album "Border Schizo FFFolk Songs For The Fuc**d" named "No Homeless People In Drogheda" addressing the "wilful blindness and denial of the homelessness crisis in Ireland from both the public and the government" alike.
- Homeless Jesus, a bronze sculpture by Canadian sculptor Timothy Schmalz, depicting Jesus as a homeless person sleeping on a park bench, which since 2013 has been installed in many places across the world, including Christ Church Cathedral, Dublin

== Homeless charities ==
- The Peter McVerry Trust
- Focus Ireland
- Simon Communities

== See also ==
- Michael Byrne, aka Old Man Belfield, a homeless man who lived for over 30 years on the grounds of University College Dublin
- Squatting in Ireland
