= Belfield, Dublin =

Locality and university campus in Ireland

Belfield Belfield (Irish)
- Enclave
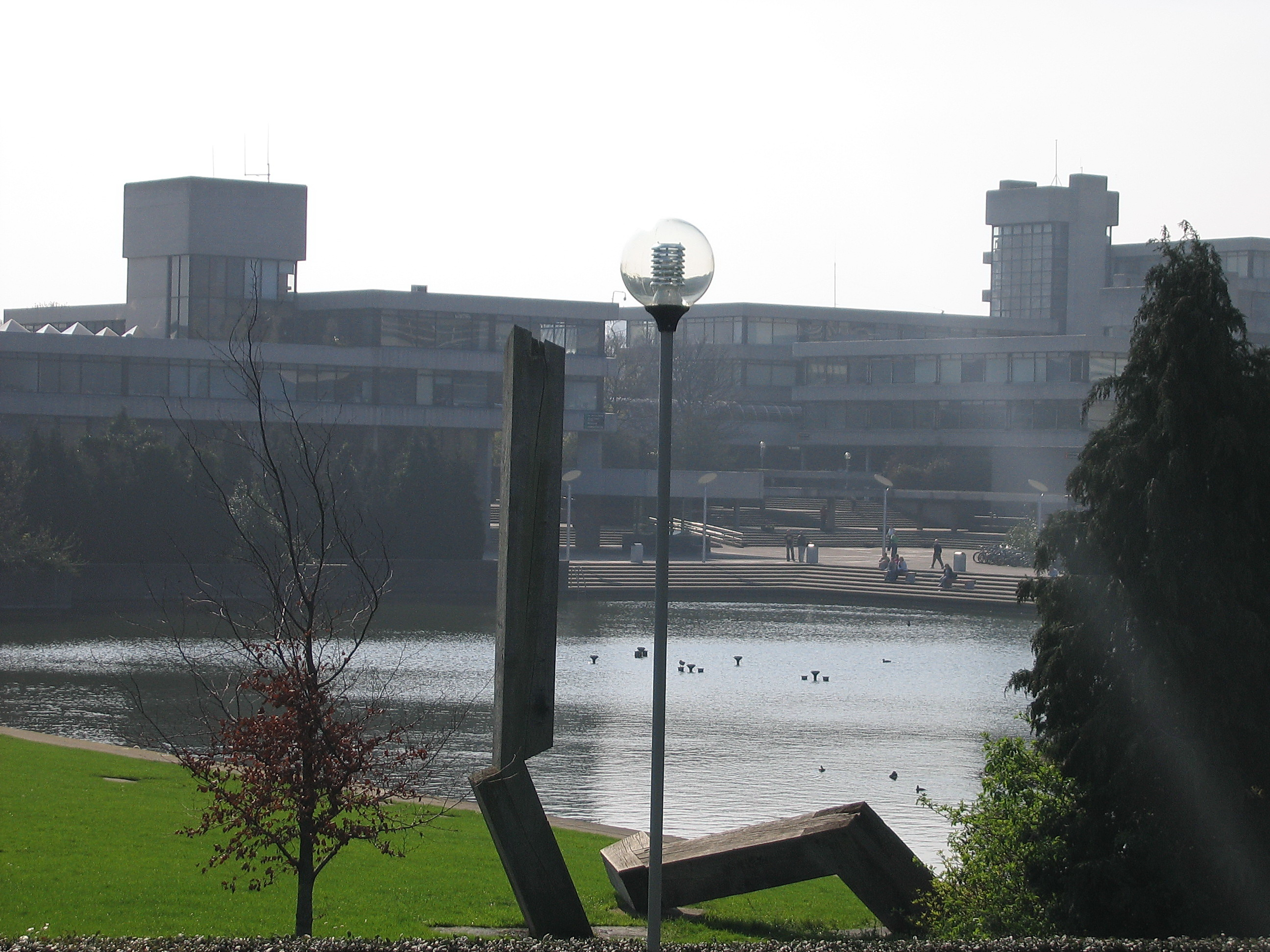
- Arts block and administrative office's at UCD's Belfield campus

- Location in Dublin
- Coordinates: 53°18′27″N 6°13′34″W
- Country: Ireland
- Province: Leinster
- County: County Dublin
- Local authority: Dún Laoghaire-Rathdown County Council

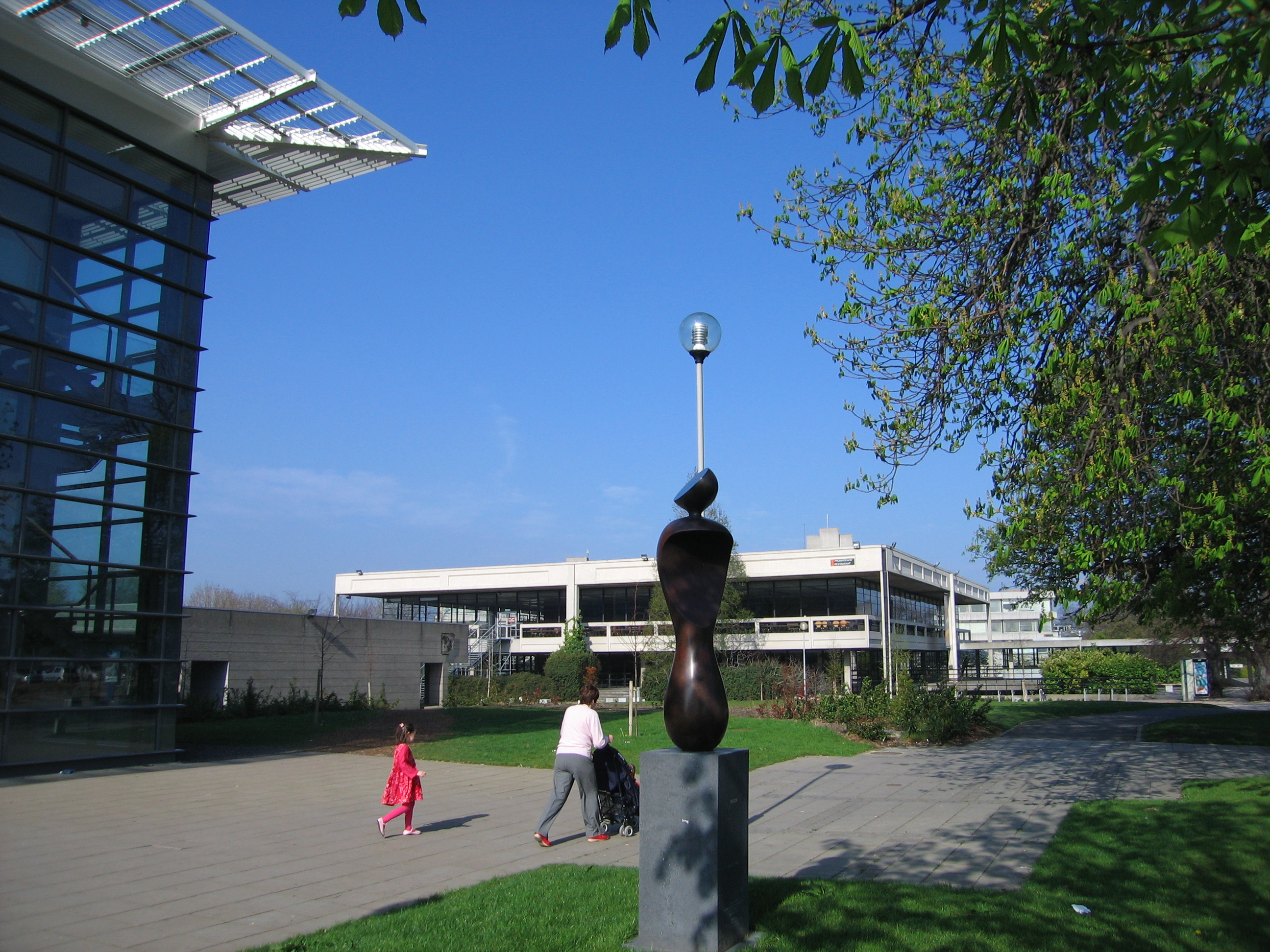
Restaurant at UCD in Belfield

Belfield (Irish: Belfield) is a small enclave, not quite a suburb, in Dún Laoghaire–Rathdown, Ireland. It is synonymous with the main campus of University College Dublin.

Belfield is close to Donnybrook, Ballsbridge, Clonskeagh, Goatstown, Stillorgan, Booterstown, Merrion and Mount Merrion and takes its name from Belfield House and Demesne, one of eight properties bought to form the main campus of University College Dublin. It is adjacent to the R138 road.

== History ==
Belfield was one of the original sites suggested as a possible location for Dublin Airport before Collinstown was chosen. Nowadays, Belfield is synonymous with University College Dublin, being the location of that institution's main 132-hectare campus. University College Dublin (UCD) dates back to its foundation at 86 St. Stephen's Green in 1851 as the Catholic University of Ireland founded by John Henry Newman who was its first rector.

In 1934, UCD bought Belfield House and from 1949 to 1958 purchased a group of adjoining properties to form a potential campus estate.

In 1960, the Government recommended that the college move from the city centre to Belfield. The first buildings to be completed on the new campus were those of the Faculty of Science in 1964. The other faculties moved to Belfield on a phased basis as their new buildings were completed, although as of 2007, parts of a few remain in Dublin city centre. Additionally, the Michael Smurfit Graduate School of Business is based on the remainder of the Carysfort (former School of Education) campus in Blackrock.

From the 1970s until his death in 2021, a homeless man, known affectionately as 'Old Man Belfield', lived rough on the campus of UCD and became well known in the area, despite rarely speaking to anyone.

== Amenities ==
The site also includes Belfield Office Park, formerly a major international call centre and technical support hub operated by Hewlett-Packard; plus a sports ground, The Belfield Bowl, at which the UCD soccer and rugby teams both play in the top divisions of their respective leagues. The area is served by the college's numerous media outlets including newspapers, the College Tribune and the University Observer, radio station Belfield FM and television station the College Television Network.

== Business ==
There are several 'office parks' located in and adjacent to Belfield, including Belfield Office Park, Clonskeagh Drive and Beech Hill Office Park, the latter with a gym adjacent. Some of the companies located here include Hewlett-Packard (until 2008 most call centre activities were based in HP's Belfield Office Park), Ericsson, Smurfit Kappa (head office), and the Department of Public Expenditure, Infrastructure, Public Service Reform and Digitalisation.

== See also ==
- List of towns and villages in Ireland
