= Stanislaus Kennedy =

Irish nun and activist (1939–2025)

Sister Stanislaus Kennedy
- Kennedy c. 1990

Personal life
- Born: Treasa Kennedy; 19 June 1939 Dingle, County Kerry, Ireland
- Died: 3 November 2025 (aged 86) Blanchardstown, Dublin, Ireland
- Education: University College Dublin; University of Manchester

Religious life
- Religion: Roman Catholic
- Order: Religious Sisters of Charity

Senior posting
- Organization: Focus Ireland; Immigrant Council of Ireland

Stanislaus Kennedy (born Treasa Kennedy; 19 June 1939 – 3 November 2025), popularly known as Sister Stan, was an Irish nun, social activist and member of the Irish Council of State. She authored several books including an autobiography. Her honours included multiple honorific doctorates.

Kennedy joined the Religious Sisters of Charity at age 18 and was mentored by Bishop Peter Birch who believed that the Catholic Church had to "identify more with the poor". She graduated in social science from University College Dublin. Kennedy was in 1974 the first chair of the National Committee to Combat Poverty. She became best known as the founder of the homelessness charity Focus Ireland in 1985, but also initiated The Sanctuary, a centre for meditation and spirituality in central Dublin, and the Immigrant Council of Ireland in 2001.

== Life and career ==
Treasa Kennedy was born on 19 June 1939 near Lispole on the Dingle Peninsula in County Kerry, the fourth of five siblings growing up on a small farm. Her parents spoke Irish when it was seen as a sign of being uneducated. She described her childhood as carefree and remembered that she felt early that she wanted to help people less advantaged. In 1958, she left home at age 18 to join the Religious Sisters of Charity and was given the religious name "Sister Stanislaus". (Note: It was tradition, that the name of a saint (a male) was given.) She made her profession in 1963 and was then sent to Kilkenny to help Bishop Peter Birch; they set up a network of social services including a meals on wheels programme believed to have been one of the first in Ireland. Birch was her mentor, passing his then controversial view that the Catholic Church had to "identify more with the poor".

Kennedy was a founding member of the Kilkenny Social Services in the 1960s. As a member of the National Federation of Youth Clubs, she was in 1969 the first woman to address the annual congress regarding provision for youth in Ireland. She was a founding member of the School of Social Education in Kilkenny in 1970 which provided the first professional courses for residential child care workers in Ireland. In 1972 she said: "I deal with all kinds of families, they may be materially in need or emotionally in need." She was a co-founder of the National Association of Child Care Workers, and of the Campaign for the Care of the Deprived Children. In 1974 she was appointed the first chair of the National Committee to Combat Poverty (later called Combat Poverty Agency). In the late 1970s, she was described by the Minister for Health, Charles Haughey, as "the most intransigent woman I've ever met". She attended University College Dublin, graduating with a social science degree in 1980. She later completed a master's degree at the University of Manchester.

In 1983, two years after the death of Birch, she worked in Dublin in research at the University College Dublin, and began to work with homeless women, living with them in a building in Eustace Street. As a result of that work, in 1985, she founded the charity Focus Ireland, dedicated to finding housing for homeless people, bringing them not only food, shelter and money, but also personal support. It became the largest voluntary organisation in Ireland, expanding beyond Dublin to Cork, Limerick, Sligo, and Waterford.

From 1995 to 2007, Kennedy was a member of the general leadership team of the Religious Sisters of Charity. In 1998 she founded The Sanctuary, a centre for meditation and spirituality in Dublin, as a place for people "to explore and develop their inner world and wisdom and find stillness". In 2001, she set up the Immigrant Council of Ireland (ICI) as a response to the social needs of new immigrants living in Ireland. In 2018, in response to protests against the congregation's involvement in healthcare, she said that "The negativity is directed at nuns. Everything is thrown together, the orphanages, the Magdalene homes, the Tuam babies, Vincent's hospital – it is all thrown together and mixed up, and it is all anti-nuns."

A 2009 report revealed that two lay workers at St Joseph's residential home in Kilkenny, where Kennedy lived and worked, had abused children in the 1970s. She said that she had not heard of sexual abuse there until an investigation in 1995. In 2020, she said in a documentary, Being Stan, a Life in Focus: "I was accused of being complicit with it, in the sense that it was alleged that I knew about the abuse and did nothing about it. ... I knew nothing about the abuse, absolutely I didn't know. But, nevertheless the allegation really upset me. It questioned everything I was about. ... I had to realise what I was suffering was nothing compared to what the boys had suffered."

Kennedy published several books, from empirical analysis to works with a spiritual focus such as Gardening The Soul. She authored six books published by Transworld Ireland, including her autobiography, The Road Home, which contains a foreword written by President Mary McAleese. Her 2023 book Finding Hope featured contributions from the Dalai Lama, Colum McCann and Orla Guerin and was dedicated to Charlie Bird. Some works became bestsellers.

== Death ==
Kennedy was ill from 2017, but did not use the word cancer to refer to her illness until 2020. She was in hospice care at St Francis Hospice in Blanchardstown where she died on 3 November 2025 at the age of 86.

Following her death, President Michael D. Higgins said she was a "fearless advocate for human rights and equality". Mary McAleese said: "All the things that she set up have a longevity because she forward planned. She's left a phenomenal engine behind her." The former Archbishop of Dublin, Diarmuid Martin, said he knew her as "a joyful, elderly nun, physically slowed down, intellectually, extraordinarily sharp".

== Honours ==
McAleese appointed Kennedy to the Council of State in 1997, and she served until 2004. In 2014, she was awarded the UCD Alumni Award for Social Sciences. Kennedy received honorary doctorates from the National University of Ireland (2003), Trinity College Dublin, University College Dublin, the Open University and the Dublin City University (2017).

== Writings ==
- Kennedy, Stanislaus (1997). Spiritual journeys: an anthology of writings by people living and working with those on the margins. Dublin: Veritas. ISBN 978-1-85390-302-1. OCLC 39796222.
- —— (1998). Reaching out to right relationships. Dublin: Veritas. ISBN 978-1-85390-333-5. OCLC 39075366.
- —— (1999). A bundle of blessings. London: St Pauls. ISBN 978-0-85439-540-8. OCLC 43032311.
- ——; Scally, John (2005). An Easter people: essays in honour of Sr Stanislaus Kennedy. Dublin, Ireland: Veritas. ISBN 978-1-85390-857-6. OCLC 58802549.
- —— (2011). Stillness: through my prayers. London: Transworld Digital. ISBN 978-1-4090-8227-9. OCLC 1005015565.
- —— (2012). The road home: my journey. Dublin: Transworld Ireland. ISBN 978-1-4464-6334-5. OCLC 931694988.
- —— (2012). Now is the Time: Spiritual Reflections. Dublin: Transworld Ireland. ISBN 978-1-4070-4104-9. OCLC 1100678271.
- —— (2012). Gardening the soul: mindful thoughts and meditations for every day of the year. Transworld Publishers Ltd. ISBN 978-1-84827-167-8. OCLC 1023332871. Reprints Gardening the Soul: A Spiritual Daybook Through the Seasons (2001; ISBN 978-1-903650-05-9; OCLC 49045671. Gardening the soul: soothing seasonal thoughts for jaded modern souls. Dublin: Transworld Ireland. 2017. ISBN 978-1-84827-234-7. OCLC 999630320.
- —— (2012). Seasons of the Day. Dublin: Transworld Ireland. ISBN 978-1-4070-4106-3. OCLC 1100662786.
- —— (2014). Seasons of hope. [Dublin]: Transworld Ireland. ISBN 978-1-84827-211-8. OCLC 909169059.
- —— (2015). To live from the heart: mindful paths to the sacred. Dublin: Transworld Ireland. ISBN 978-1-84827-227-9. OCLC 945570152.
- —— (2015). Sister Stan's Book of Inspirations. Blackrock, Co. Dublin: The Columba Press. ISBN 978-1-78218-220-7. OCLC 1429189674.
- —— (2016). Day by day. Dublin: Transworld Ireland. ISBN 978-1-84827-232-3. OCLC 936144885.
- —— (2016). Mindful meditations for every day. Columba Press. ISBN 978-1-78218-309-9. OCLC 989789997.
- —— (2018). Awakening inner peace: a little book of hours. Dublin: Columba Books. ISBN 978-1-78218-344-0. OCLC 1103949836.
- —— (2021). Finding peace. Dublin: Columba Books. ISBN 978-1-78218-381-5. OCLC 1263779201.
- —— (2023). Finding hope. Dublin: Columba Books. ISBN 978-1-78218-396-9. OCLC 1355078363.
