= Peter McVerry =

Irish priest and activist (born 1944)

Peter McVerry SJ
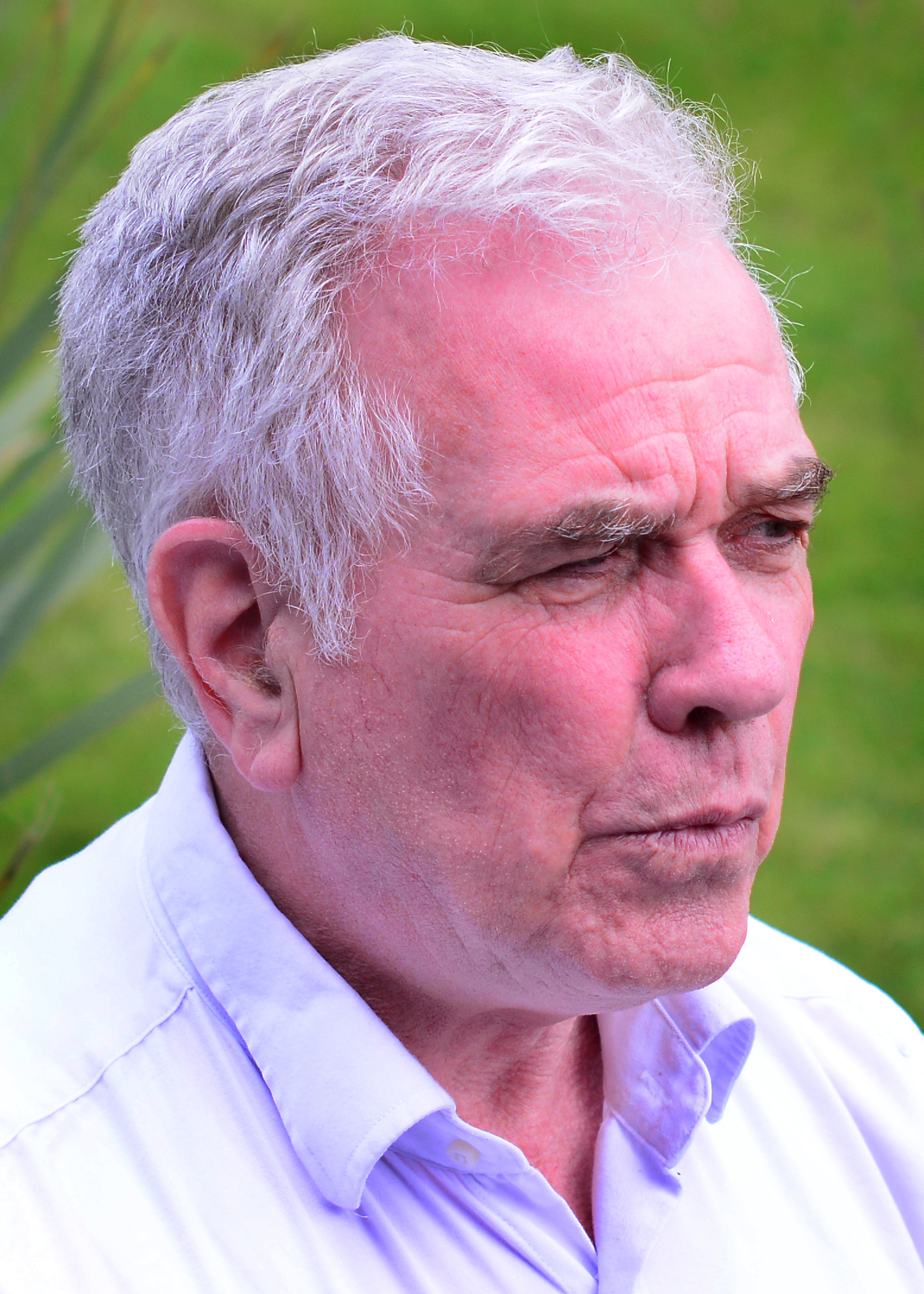
- McVerry in 2014

Orders
- Ordination: 1975

Personal details
- Born: 1944 (age 81–82) Belfast, Northern Ireland
- Denomination: Catholic Church
- Education: Milltown Institute of Theology and Philosophy

Peter McVerry SJ (born 1944) is an Irish Catholic priest and founder of the Peter McVerry Trust, which battles homelessness in Ireland. According to one report, the Peter McVerry Trust helped 3,600 homeless people in Dublin in 2013.

== Early years ==
Born in Belfast in 1944, McVerry grew up in Newry. He was educated by the Christian Brothers in Abbey Christian Brothers' Grammar School, and later attended Clongowes College. He entered the Society of Jesus in 1962.

He received a BSc in Chemistry (1968) and a Higher Diploma in Education (1996) from University College Dublin in 1963. He studied philosophy and theology in the Jesuit School of Theology in Milltown Park.

== Fighting homelessness ==
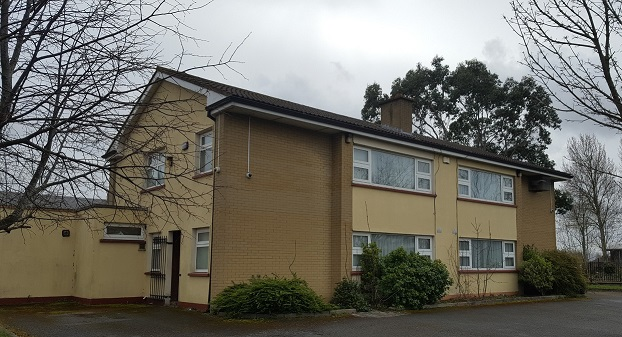
Jesuit community at Shangan, Ballymun

After his ordination as a priest in 1975, McVerry lived and worked in Summerhill, North Dublin. During these years he came face to face with the problem of homelessness and deprivation. He set up a trust to help struggling young people. He first worked in Ballymun and the North Inner City during the 1970s when he found young homeless people in the streets. In 1983, he founded a charity to tackle homelessness called The Arrupe Society after Jesuit leader Pedro Arrupe, but it was subsequently renamed the Peter McVerry Trust, which began as a three-bedroom flat in Ballymun.

We started working with young people and opened a youth club and a craft centre and then I came across a kid sleeping on the street aged nine-years-old ... We decided we better add a hostel to the services we were already running for young people so we opened a small hostel down in the inner city for six boys, as it was all boys then, there were no girls on the streets in the 1970s.

— Fr Peter McVerry

The trust grew from one flat over the years, to include eleven homeless hostels, over 100 apartments, a residential drug detox centre and two drug stabilisation services. In 1979, he opened a hostel for young homeless boys aged between twelve and sixteen. He focused on those deemed too difficult to deal with by other agencies. McVerry recently opened a residential drug detox centre in County Dublin for homeless drug users. McVerry has lived in Ballymun since 1980.

The homeless in Ireland are not a problem, they are simply people who have come upon difficult times and circumstances.

— Fr Peter McVerry

In 2013, the charity worked with almost 3,600 vulnerable youths. There was controversy in 2014 when a candidate for political office used images of McVerry in campaign leaflets, and McVerry denied that he was endorsing any particular candidate. He appealed to the government to buy more housing for the homeless. He advocated greater spending to help reduce inequality. In 2014, he stated that the crisis of homelessness was threatening middle-class and working-class families.

In 2015, Trinity College Dublin awarded him with an honorary doctorate. The same year, he was awarded the UCD Alumni Award in Science.

== Peter McVerry Trust ==
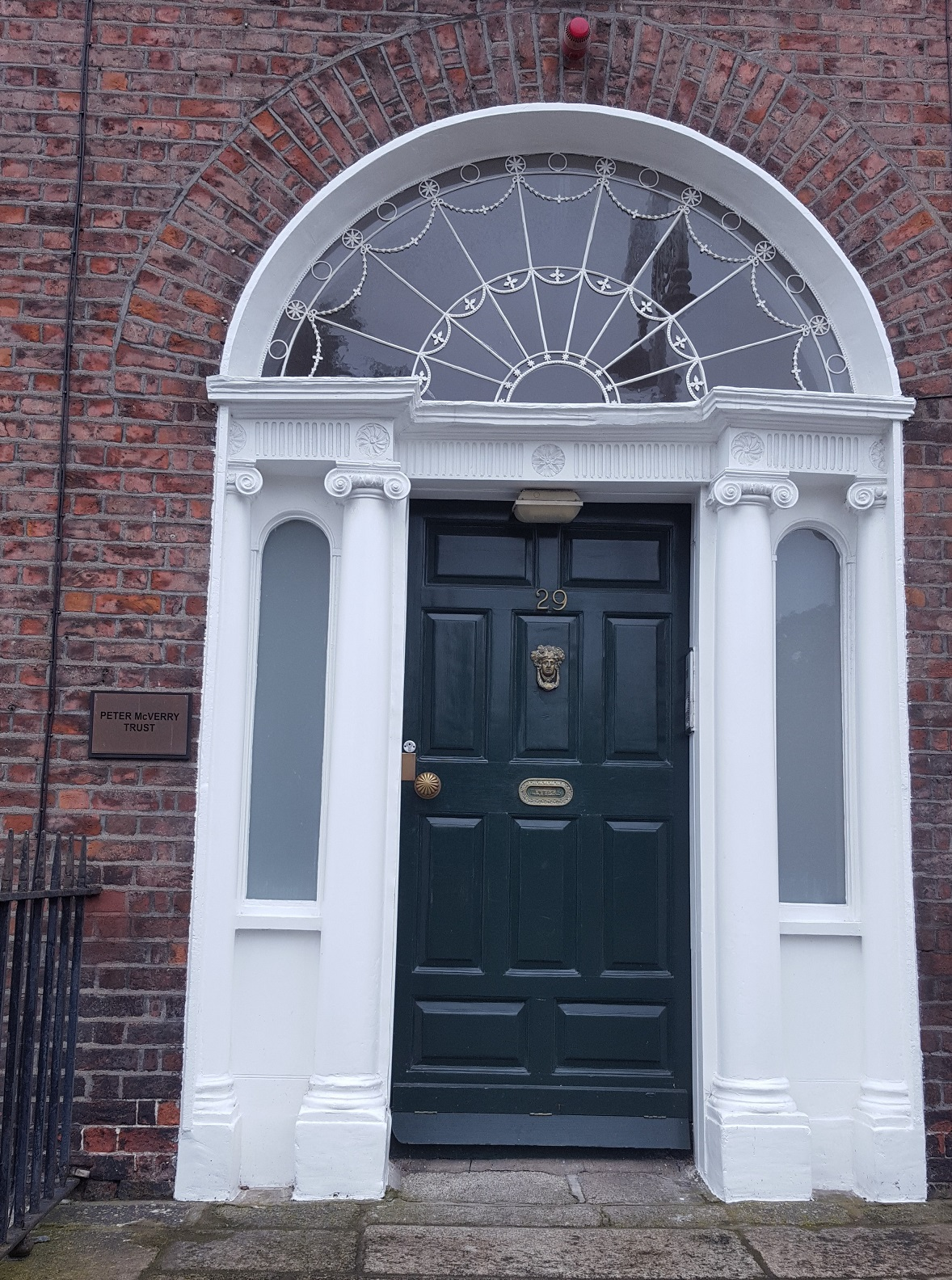
Head office of the McVerry Trust at Mountjoy Square

The Peter McVerry Trust (known previously as The Arrupe Society) was founded in 1983 as a charity to reduce homelessness in Ireland. The organisation was a continuation of work Fr. McVerry had been doing in Ballymun. The Arrupe Jesuit community in Ballymun involved itself directly with missionary work on the ground in one of Dublin’s poorest districts; working to scaffold community-building among socially disadvantaged people.

In 2023, the Approved Housing Bodies Regulatory Authority (AHBRA) appointed inspectors from Mazars to carry out a review of the financing and governance at the charity. Their findings indicated that the organisation was facing serious and immediate cash flow pressures.
