= The Journal (Ireland) =

Irish online news publication

- Type: Online newspaper
- Owner: Journal Media
- Editor: Sinead O'Carroll
- Deputy editor: Christine Bohan
- Managing editor: Susan Daly
- Staff writers: 20 news department staff
- Founded: 2010; 16 years ago
- Headquarters: 4th floor, Golden Lane, Latin Hall, Dublin 8
- Circulation: 750,000 monthly unique users (December 2011)
- Website: thejournal.ie

The Journal (formerly styled as TheJournal.ie) is an online newspaper in Ireland. It was a mixture of original and aggregated content, before moving to entirely original content. The website was founded in early 2010.

It was edited by Jennifer O'Connell from 2010 to 2011, and by Susan Daly between 2011 and August 2019, when Sinead O'Carroll stepped into the role with Daly's promotion to Managing Editor. The publication employs approximately 75 people.

== Content ==
The Journal produces 70 original pieces of content per day. The website was originally divided into four components: TheJournal.ie itself for Irish and international news and opinion; Fora for business news; The 42 (formerly TheScore) for sports news; and The Daily Edge for entertainment and gossip.

The Daily Edge ceased operations on 29 March 2019 and Fora on 9 April 2020. Fora was wound down due to a decline in advertising revenue prompting the parent to reduce its costs in the wake of the COVID-19 pandemic in Ireland.

=== Noteworthy ===
The investigative platform Noteworthy was launched in April 2019. It is an Irish investigative journalism platform, published by Journal Media. Readers are invited to submit ideas for investigations and these are then crowdfunded through the site. The site received backing from Google's Digital News Innovation fund in 2018 to create the platform.

Investigations by Noteworthy have won and been shortlisted for Irish and international awards, including a nomination for the Mary Raftery Prize for the series on planning in Kilkenny called "A bridge too far", and the Justice Media Awards. In 2021, Maria Delaney of Noteworthy and Michelle Hennessy of TheJournal, were awarded the Journalism Excellence Award at the Irish Red Cross Humanitarian Awards for their series "Tough Start" investigating the experiences of children from the Traveller community in the Irish education system. Investigations have also been cited in the Seanad and Dáil on a number of occasions.

=== The 42 ===
The 42 is an Irish app and sports news website, published by Journal Media. It covers association football, GAA sports, rugby, athletics, boxing, MMA and other sports. The website was formerly known as TheScore.ie before changing its name to The 42 in 2014. The name is a reference to the relaxation of Rule 42 in 2005 that allowed Croke Park to host soccer and rugby. The sports site is run by editor Adrian Russell, with Niall Kelly acting as deputy editor.

In April 2019, The 42 was named Sports Media Outlet of the Year at the Irish Sport Federation awards.

== Awards ==
=== 2011 ===
TheJournal.ie won three Eircom Spider Awards—Best News Site, the Digital Editor Award, and the Grand Prix Award for Best Overall Site. It also won two Irish Web Awards—Best Online Publication and Grand Prix for Best Website. In addition, it won the award for Best Media/Publishing App at the Appy Awards.

=== 2020 ===
In 2020, TheJournal.ie won the Mary Raftery Prize for its podcast series on the Stardust fire.

== Authors and contributors ==
Journalists and reporters with The Journal include Aoife Barry, Christine Bohan, Daragh Brophy, Orla Ryan, Emer Moreau, Carl Kinsella and Christina Finn. Other occasional contributors include Rory Hearne and Emma DeSouza. Writers who previously worked for TheJournal.ie include Gavan Reilly and Emer McLysaght.
