= College Tribune =

Student newspaper of University College Dublin

- Volume 29, Issue 2
- Type: Student newspaper
- Format: Tabloid
- School: University College Dublin
- Founder: Vincent Browne
- Staff writers: c. 150
- Founded: 1989
- Language: English, Irish
- Headquarters: John Henry Newman Building
- City: Dublin
- Country: Ireland
- Circulation: 6,000
- Readership: 28,000 print + 17,000 online
- Website: collegetribune.ie
- Free online archives: Publication

The College Tribune is a student newspaper which serves Ireland's largest third level institution, University College Dublin. It was established in 1989 with the assistance of journalist and broadcaster Vincent Browne who was attending the university as an evening student at the time. Browne noted the campus' lack of a news outlet which was independent of both the university and University College Dublin Students' Union and alongside founding editor Eamon Dillon set up the Tribune to correct this. Initially, a close working relationship was maintained between the Tribune and the Sunday Tribune which was at the time edited by Browne. This relationship afforded the paper the use of professional production facilities in its fledgling years. Ultimately however, the student newspaper would outlast its national weekly counterpart with the Sunday Tribune having ceased publication in 2011. The College Tribune is UCD's oldest surviving newspaper having been published continuously for over 30 years.

== Print edition ==
The print edition is circulated at the university's Belfield and Blackrock campuses fortnightly during semesters one and two each year. Throughout its history, the College Tribune has been printed in tabloid format. Issues are typically 32 pages in length with the paper proper occupying 20 pages with news, features, science and technology, business, politics and innovation, Irish and sport. The remaining 12 pages are a pull-out arts and culture supplement The Trib which covers music, film, fashion, arts, satire and entertainment. The Trib, previously The Siren, was introduced during Volume 20 and was later renamed for the paper's nickname. The Tribune also includes a satire section named 'The Turbine' which was previously named the 'Angry Gerald'.

== Online ==
Articles from the print edition and dedicated content are also published on the paper's website, collegetribune.ie. A standalone version of the website was launched in 2011, having previously been hosted with assistance from the university's computer science society on UCD's own website. Content is also shared through social media sites including Facebook and Twitter.

== Independence ==
The Tribune is the only student newspaper in Ireland which operates independently of the authorities of the university in which it is published. To achieve this, the paper is supported entirely through advertising revenue. Editors and section editors are unpaid volunteers with an interest in journalism who are drawn from the university community. While the Tribune engages with university and students' union authorities in order to represent students interests, they have no control over the content of the paper. Of the other three campus media outlets two, Belfield FM and UCDTV are student societies while the University Observer is published by the students' union.

== Notable alumni ==
Several journalists working both in Ireland and further afield can trace their roots back to the College Tribune. As UCD does not offer a dedicated journalism course at undergraduate or postgraduate level, many students cut their teeth by involving themselves in the campus' student newspapers. Previous editors who have gone on to make careers for themselves include Richard Oakley – editor of The Times Ireland, Conor Lally – crime correspondent for The Irish Times, Daniel McDonnell – soccer correspondent for the Irish Independent, Roddy O'Sullivan – deputy news editor of The Irish Times, Eamon Dillon – crime journalist with theSunday World, Jennifer Bray – political correspondent for the Irish Daily Mail, Sarah Binchy – radio producer at RTÉ Radio, Alan Caufield, editor of Metro, Colin Gleeson and Peter McGuire – freelance journalists, and brothers Gary and Fergus O'Shea, both now with The Sun.

Other past contributors include Kate Hayes – TV producer for the BBC, Dave Kelly – chief sports analyst for the Irish Independent, Ruaidhri O'Connor – Rugby correspondent with the Irish Independent, Paul Lynch – author of Red Sky in Morning, Katherine Smyth – associate producer with BBC Current Affairs, Blathnaid Healy - formerly UK editor at Mashable and now EMEA Director at CNN Digital International, and Donie O'Sullivan, CNN Reporter in New York.

== Awards ==
The Tribune has been recognised on a number of occasions at the national student media awards, including for sports writing. In addition to winning Student Newspaper of the Year at the 1996 USI & Irish Independent Media Awards, then editor Conor Lally was also awarded Student Journalist of the Year. 2003 saw Tribune stalwart Peter Lahiff win Diversity Writer of the Year at the Guardian Student Media Awards. In 2016/17 the paper won the Student Media "Newspaper of the Year" award, after breaking several investigative stories in the Tribune and the national media, including a front-page story in the Irish Times on the €3 million budget overrun of the Chinese Confucius Centre on campus. In 2019, the Turbine's then editor Shane Clune won the Student Media 'Colour Writer of the Year' award. In 2020, Conor Capplis, then Editor of The College Tribune won 'Editor of the Year' In 2021, The College Tribune took home a number of awards in the National Student Media Awards with Hugh Dooley, News Editor and former Turbine Editor, winning 'Colour Writer of the Year' and Eagarthóir Gaeilge of The College Tribune, Anna-Clare Nic Gairbheith won the 'Journalism through Irish' award.
