= The University Observer =

Irish newspaper

- Ne quid false dicere audeat, ne quid veri non-audeat ("To tell no untruth and leave no truth untold")
- University Observer, 29 September 2009
- Type: Fortnightly student newspaper
- Format: Broadsheet with accompanying arts and culture magazine
- School: University College Dublin
- Founded: 1994
- Language: English; Irish
- Headquarters: UCD Student Centre, University College Dublin, Belfield, Dublin, Ireland
- Sister newspapers: OTwo
- Website: universityobserver.ie

The University Observer is a broadsheet newspaper distributed throughout the campus of University College Dublin, Ireland, once four three weeks.

Launched in 1994 by University College Dublin Students' Union, the newspaper was an immediate successor to the publication Students' Union News. The University Observer was founded by dual editors Pat Leahy (who later joined The Irish Times) and Dara Ó Briain (later a broadcaster and comedian). Other former editors include a number of Irish journalists who went on to other publications, including Killian Woods (later of the Business Post), Samantha Libreri (of RTÉ News), and Gavan Reilly (of Virgin Media Television and Newstalk).

The University Observer has won a number of awards, including several "newspaper of the year" awards at Ireland's National Student Media Awards.
