= Focus Ireland =

Non-profit organisation in Dublin, Ireland

- Charity logo as of 2020
- Formation: 1985
- Founder: Stanislaus Kennedy
- Type: Charitable organisation
- Registration no.: CHY7220
- Legal status: Non-profit
- Purpose: Housing and homelessness
- Location: Dublin
- Region served: Ireland
- Website: focusireland.ie

Focus Ireland is an Irish nonprofit organisation based in Dublin that provides services for people who are homeless or at risk of homelessness in Ireland. It was founded by Sister Stanislaus Kennedy in 1985, and is one of the largest housing and homelessness organisations in Ireland. It provides services in Dublin, Cork, Limerick, Kilkenny, Sligo, Kildare, Carlow, Tipperary, Wexford and Waterford.

The charity's stated mission is "to advance the right of people-out-of-home to live in a place they call home through quality services, research, and advocacy". In 2017 it spent €26.3 million to that end. Focus Ireland receives approximately half of its budget each year through state funding and raises the other 50% through donations from the public, events and corporate support.

According to its 2018 annual report, Focus Ireland helped over 15,000 people in 2018 who were homeless or at risk of losing their home. According to the same report, the charity's housing association arm had provided over 1,100 homes to individuals and families in Ireland.

As of May 2020, there were nearly 10,000 people homeless, including over 3,000 children, and Focus Ireland called for a review of the supports offered by the state. The charity also called for an urgent increase in the provision of social and affordable rental housing, and for the state to move away from its reliance on providing housing in the private rented market.

Focus Ireland's work includes lobbying for changes in public policy and provision for those experiencing homelessness. As of the 21st century, Focus Ireland has started to focus on preventing homelessness and on a 'Housing Led' approach by providing a secure home first.

Under Focus Ireland's 2017–2020 Strategy Plan, the organisation's stated aims focus on preventing homelessness and supporting people who are homeless to move into secure accommodation.
