= University College Dublin Students' Union =

UCD Students' Union
- Institution: University College Dublin
- Location: Old Student Centre, Belfield, Dublin
- Established: 1975
- President: Michael Roche (as of 2025)
- Membership: c. 30,000 (as of 2015)
- Website: ucdsu.ie

University College Dublin Students' Union (UCDSU; Irish: Aontas na Mac Léinn COBÁC) is the students' union of University College Dublin. It is the largest students' union in Ireland.

The union was founded in 1975 as the successor of the Student Representative Council, with Enda Connolly acting as the organisation's first president. Its primary role is to represent its members views and defend their interests.

All students of UCD who are studying for a degree or postgraduate diploma of the National University of Ireland are, on registration at the university, members. In addition to its campaign work, the union also provides a number of welfare and education services and operates three shops.

== History ==
The union has been involved in several social changes in Ireland – including selling condoms from 1979, when the sale of contraceptives without a prescription was still illegal. The Director of Public Prosecutions considered legal action against the union but ultimately demurred, believing the union was deliberately attempting to provoke a case and that the "clearly unconstitutional" 1935 law prohibiting their sale had "little or no chance of being upheld". The sale of contraceptives without a prescription was finally legalised in 1985.

The union has also been involved in campaigns for the right to publish information about abortion. In 1988, the Society for the Protection of Unborn Children (Spuc) threatened the union with legal action if information on abortion was published in its welfare guide. The union went ahead and published information on abortion clinics in Britain, and a case was taken against it, Spuc v. Coogan, that was later joined by the Trinity College Student Union and Union of Students in Ireland in Spuc v. Grogan. The case was initially dismissed in the High Court, on the basis that Spuc lacked standing, but Spuc ultimately prevailed in the Supreme Court leaving the unions involved with large legal fees. The case ultimately reached the European Court of Justice, which established that under the Treaty of Rome abortion was a service and a Member State could not prohibit the distribution of information about a service legally provided in another Member State. While establishing the principle that Ireland could not block the publication of abortion information from foreign clinics or their agents, the court found that it was legal for Ireland to block information from third parties. The court, however, found against the students due to their status as unconnected third parties and leaving them with their costs. The provision of information on abortion services was ultimately legalised in the 1995 Abortion Information Act.

As of the early 21st century, the union had some financial problems. A 2012 audit found shoddy financial practices devoid of checks and balances since 2007, racking up €1.4m in debt including nearly €400,000 in liability to the tax authorities, ultimately requiring a bailout from UCD. Following this, the union incorporated as a limited liability company in 2012.

The union has had a "rocky relationship" with the national student union of Ireland, Aontas na Mac Léinn in Éirinn (then known as the Union of Students in Ireland, or USI) disaffiliating and reaffiliating several times over the years. The union decided to leave in a referendum in February 2013; 67% of students voted to leave the national union, reaffirming this in a 2016 with 74% of students voting for the union to remain outside of USI. Issues for disaffiliating cited by members of UCDSU included the ineffectual leadership of USI, transparency in its operations and the cost of affiliation of over €100,000. UCDSU ceased being a member organisation on 1 July 2013, and remained as such until April 2025, following an affiliation referendum with 63.7% of voting students choosing to rejoin USI.

== Structure ==
The main governing body of UCDSU is the union's council, which meets every second week of term. The council is composed chiefly of class representatives elected in their respective constituencies. The council's power is conferred in a de facto manner on the Union Executive outside of term.

The Union Executive is composed of elected sabbatical and non-sabbatical officers as well as the union secretary. There are several sabbatical officers, who are involved in the day-to-day running of the union. The president and two nominated vice-presidents, as agreed by the executive, are student representatives on the UCD Governing Authority. A sabbatical term of office is twelve months in duration and commences on 1 July each year. Sabbatical elections take place in late February–early March of each year. Sabbatical officers take a year out from academic studies and work full-time for the union.

The composition of the union's council includes a number of full-time elected sabbatical executive officers, elected non-sabbatical executive officers, class representatives, campaign coordinators and an entertainments forum.
