= Donation =

Gift for a cause

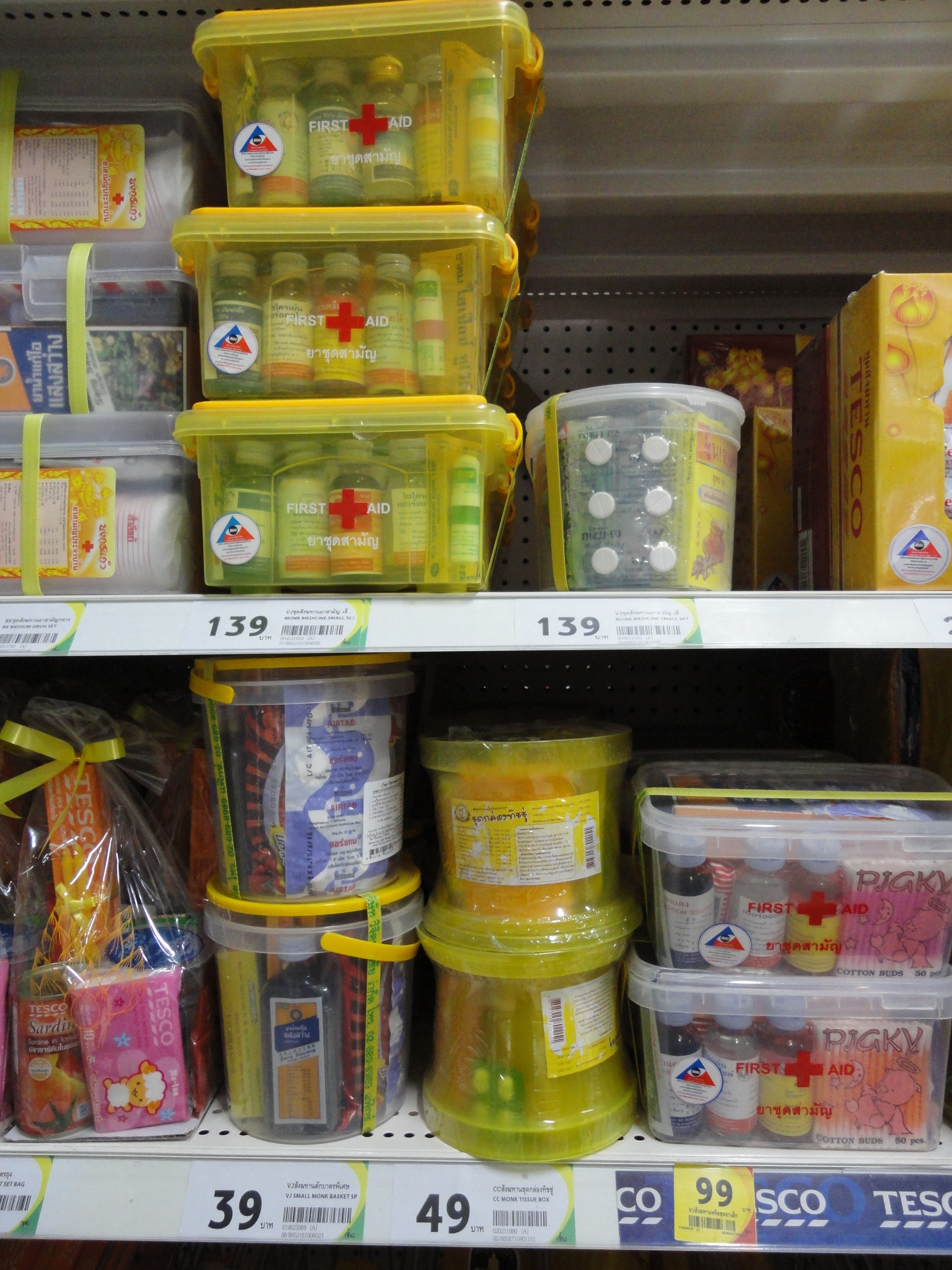
Pre-packaged donations for monks in Thailand

A donation is a gift for charity, humanitarian aid, or to benefit a cause. A donation may take various forms, including money, alms, services, or goods such as clothing, toys, food, or vehicles. A donation may satisfy medical needs such as blood or organs for transplant.

Charitable donations of goods or services are also called gifts in kind.

== Donating statistics ==
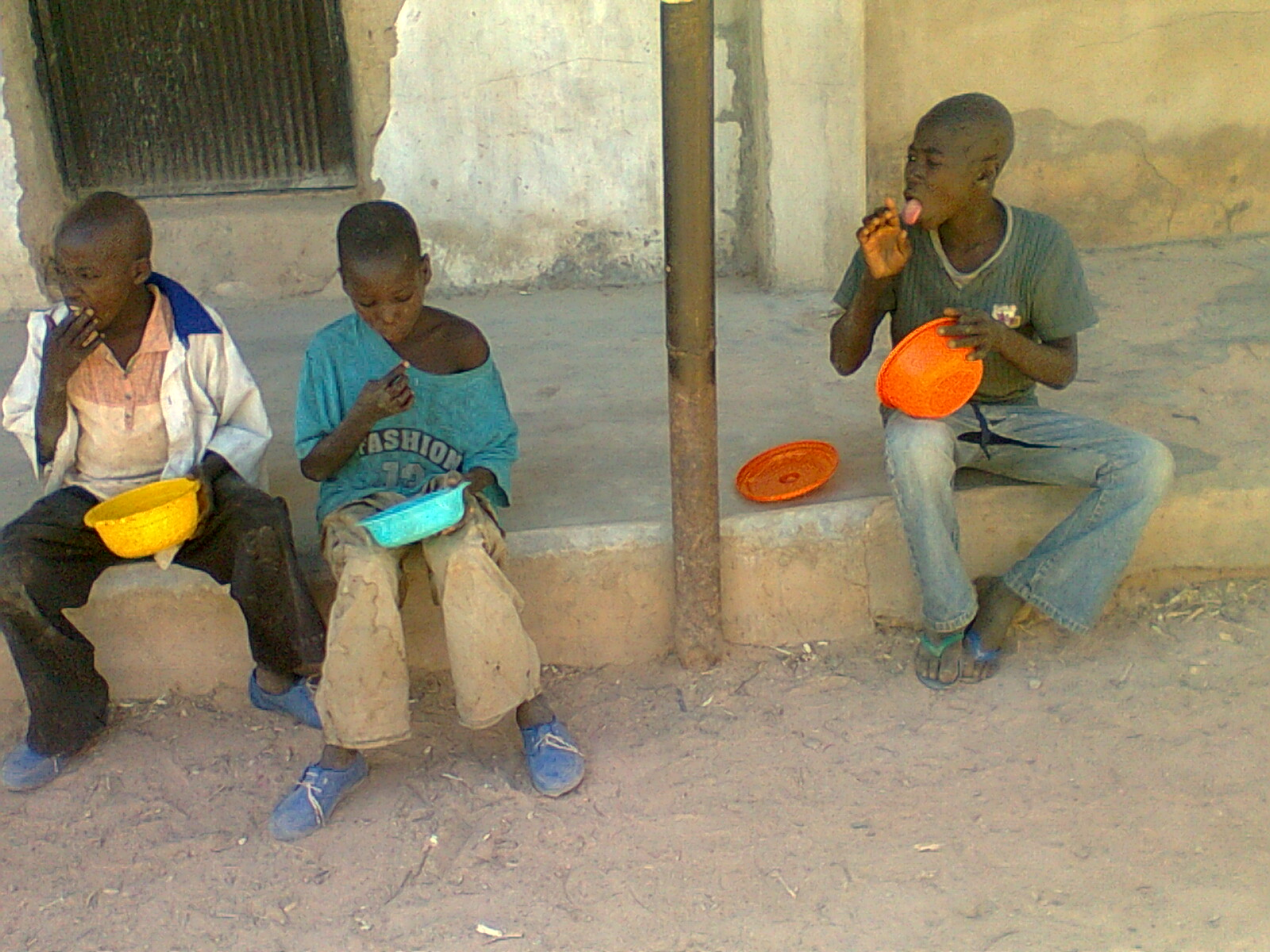
Almajri (Nigerian street children) eating donated food

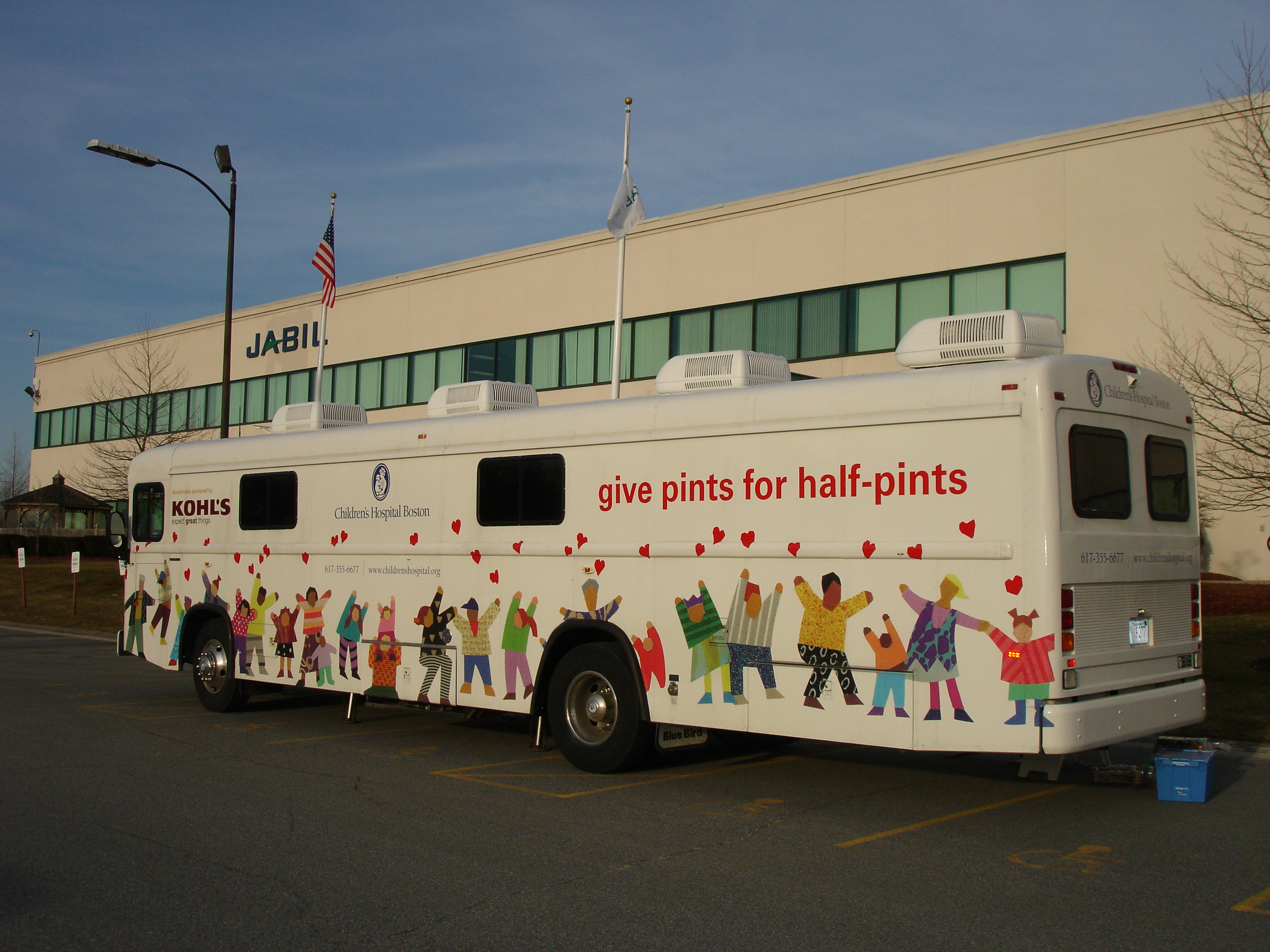
A blood collection bus (bloodmobile) from the Boston Children's Hospital

In the United States, in 2007, the Bureau of Labor Statistics found that American households in the lowest fifth in terms of wealth, gave on average a higher percentage of their incomes to charitable organizations than those households in the highest fifth. Charity Navigator writes that, according to Giving USA, Americans gave $298 billion in 2011 (about 2% of GDP). The majority of donations were from individuals (73%), then from bequests (about 12%), foundations (2%) and less than 1% from corporations. The largest sector to receive donations was religious organizations (32%), then education (13%). Giving has increased in 3 out of 4 years since 1971 (with the occasional declines occurring around recession years).

Blackbaud reports that, in the US, online giving in 2012 grew by 11% on a year-over-year basis. The percentage of total fundraising that comes from online giving was about 7% in 2012. This was an increase from 6% in 2011 and is nearing the record level of 8% from 2010 when online giving spiked in response to Haitian earthquake relief efforts. Steve MacLaughlin notes in the report that "the Internet has now become the first-response channel of choice for donors during disasters and other emergency events."

Blackbaud's 2015 Charitable Giving report revealed a 9% increase in online donations compared to 2014. In addition, online giving represented 7% of overall fundraising, with 14% of all online donations made on mobile devices. Donations made on the international online giving day #GivingTuesday were up 52% from the previous year.

Funraise's 2020 Global Trends in Giving report shows that baby boomers give more than all other generations combined (51%), and that 40% of all donors have given through Facebook, 68% of donors also volunteer as a way to further support charities, and 57% are enrolled in a recurring donation program.

In Australia, donation statistics are made available annually by the Australian Taxation Office (ATO), in the form of detailed tables breaking down the items in the individual tax return by gender, age, income, and state/territory. In Australia, individuals submit an income tax return based on their personal income levels and source(s). Unlike in other Western jurisdictions, income tax returns cannot be submitted as a couple or household, and standard deductions are not available for donations.

The most recent year of available data is 2022–2023. Analysis of the ATO data showed that the total amount donated and claimed as tax-deductible donations in 2022–23 was $9.1 billion (compared to $4.55 billion for the previous income year). This constitutes an increase of 99.96 per cent or an additional $4.5 billion in donations. The average tax-deductible donation made to DGRs and claimed by Australian taxpayers in 2022–23 was $2,031.60 (compared to $1,067.17 in the previous income year).

The ATO data in no way represents all gifts, being limited to giving by individual taxpayers to DGRs. Furthermore, not all gifts will be claimed, either due to forgetfulness or a conscious decision not to claim. Broadly speaking, those whose income is derived from their superannuation (personal retirement savings) are not required to pay tax or submit a return, so their gifts are not included. Additionally, the data does not include giving from trusts or companies or giving by persons overseas who are not Australian taxpayers. The ATO dataset also does not examine other forms of giving such as time (volunteering) or goods under $5,000 in value.

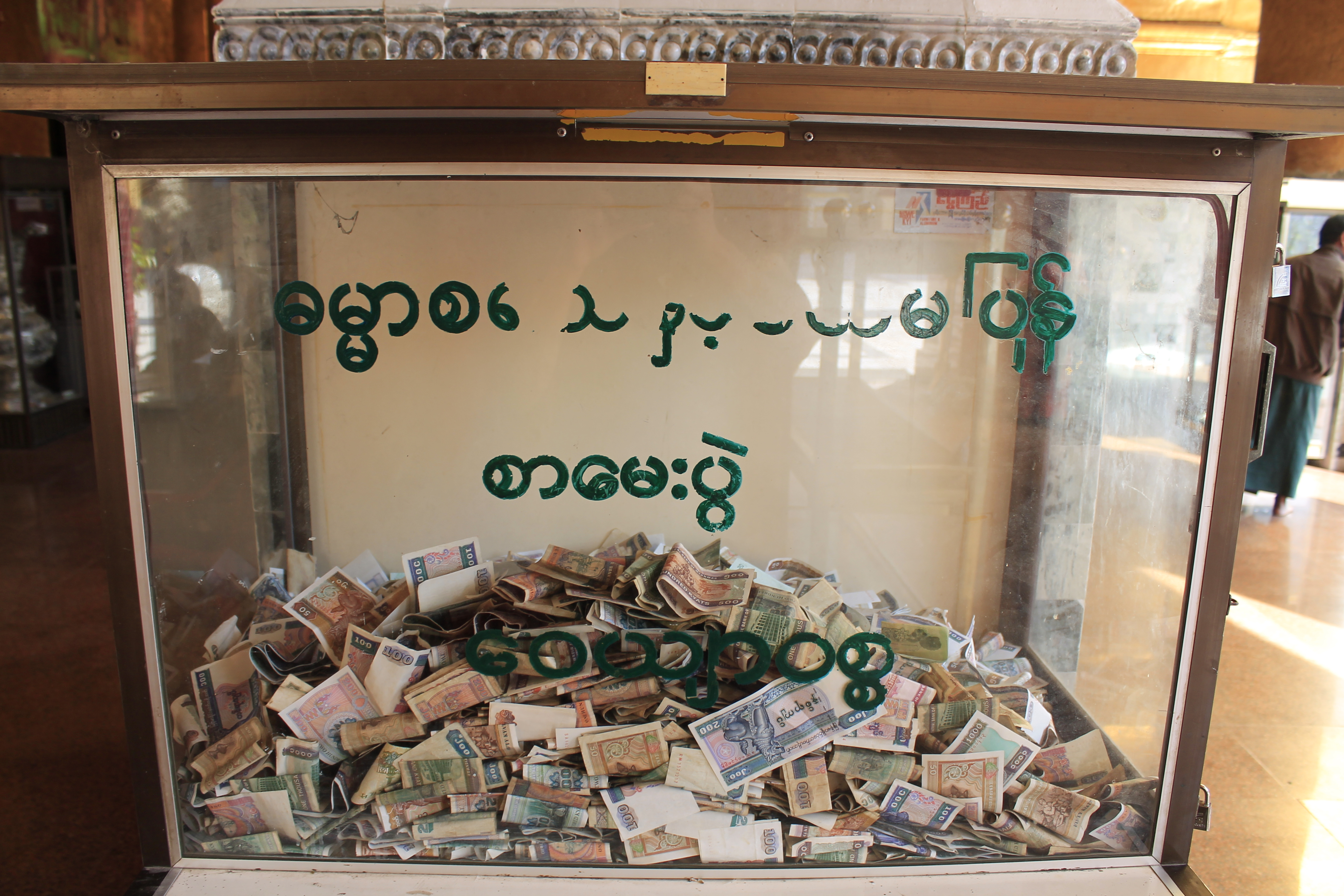
A donation box at the Mahamuni Buddha Temple in Mandalay, Myanmar

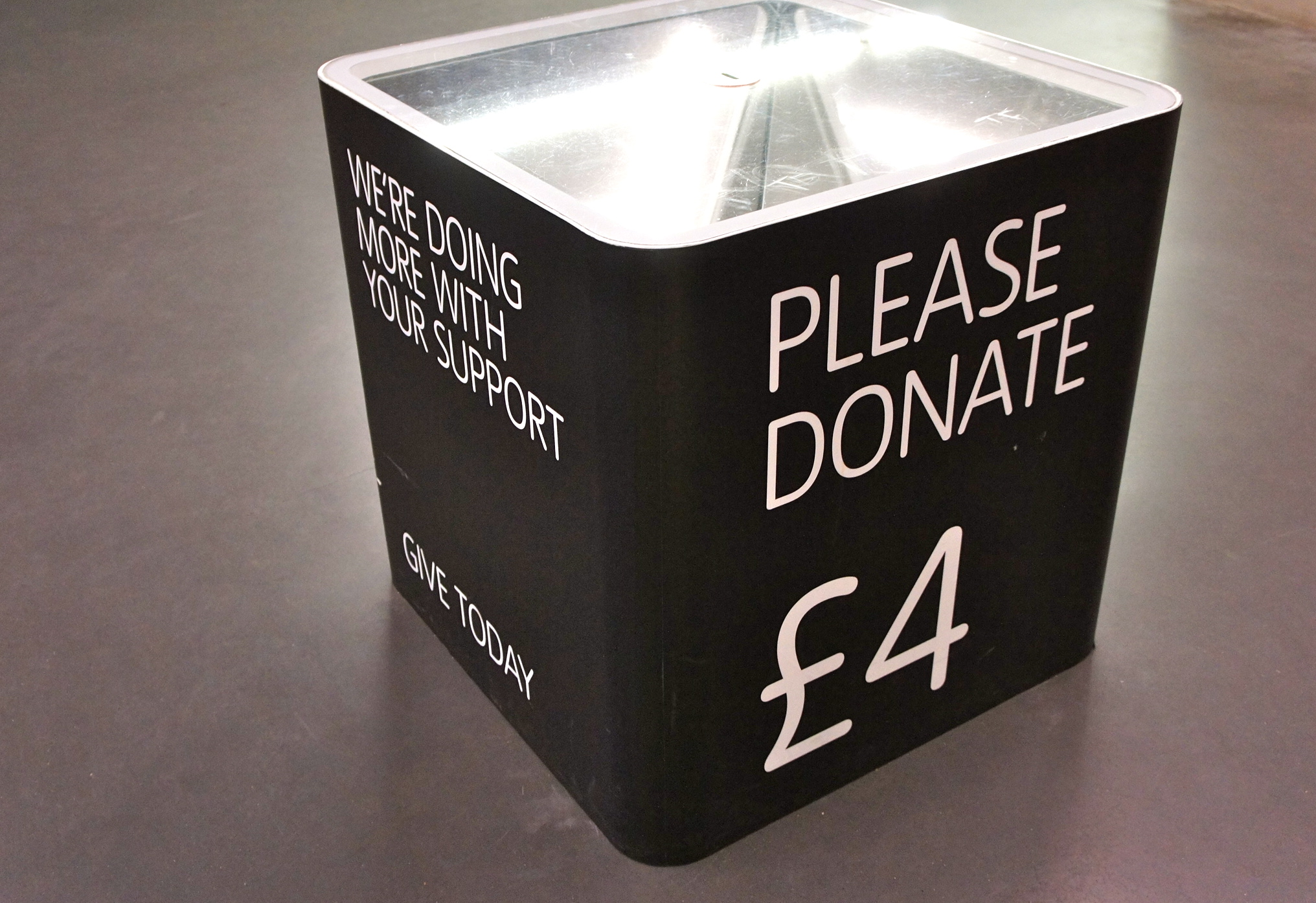
This is another box asking for donations. It even mentions “we are doing more with your support.”

== Legal aspects ==
Donations are given without return consideration. This lack of return consideration means that, in common law, an agreement to make a donation is an "imperfect contract void for want of consideration." Only when the donation is made does it acquire legal status as a transfer or property.

In politics, the law of some countries may prohibit or restrict the extent to which politicians may accept gifts or donations of large sums of money, especially from business or lobby groups (see campaign finance). Donations of money or property to qualifying charitable organizations are also usually tax deductible. Because this reduces the state's tax income, calls have been raised that the state (and the public in general) should pay more attention towards ensuring that charities use this 'tax money' in suitable ways.

There have been discussions on whether also a donation of time should be tax deductible.

The person or institution giving a gift is called the donor, and the person or institution getting the gift is called the donee.

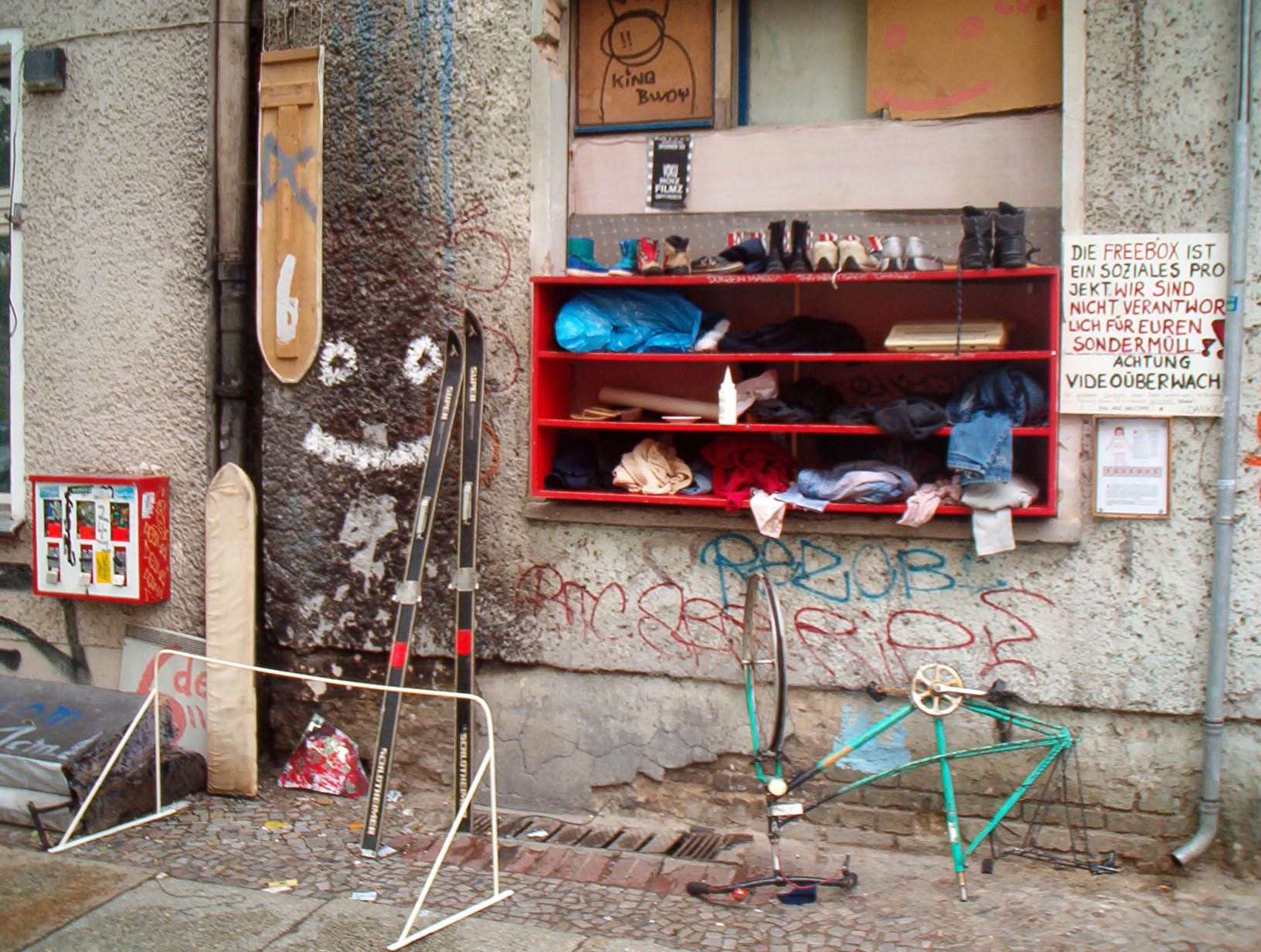
A free box in Berlin, Germany, serving as a distribution center for free donated materials

== Donating in the name of others ==
It is possible to donate in the name of a third party, making a gift in honor or memory of someone or something. Gifts in honor or memory of a third party are made for various reasons, such as holiday gifts, wedding gifts, in memory of somebody who has died, in memory of pets or in the name of groups or associations that no longer exist. Memorial gifts are sometimes requested by their survivors (e.g. "in lieu of flowers, contributions may be made to ABC Charity"), usually directing donations to a charitable organization for which the deceased was a donor or volunteer, or for a cause befitting the deceased's priorities in life or manner of death. Memorial donations are also sometimes given by people unable to attend the ceremony.

== Donating anonymously ==
There are also circumstances when people like to donate funds to their preferred causes by not revealing their names. Many donors such as public figures or philanthropists like to stay anonymous while making generous donations for various reasons such as to not be asked for money from other organisations or their religious beliefs. Many donors like to stay anonymous because of their religious beliefs or simply don't want any notoriety from giving.

== See also ==
- Crowdfunding and humanitarian crowdfunding
- Charitable organization
- Charity (Christian virtue)
- Charity (practice)
- Donation box
- Donation (Catholic canon law)
- Effective altruism
- Generosity
- Gift
- Gifts in kind
- Micro-donation
- Philanthropy
