= Charity regulators =

State organization that regulates charities and not-for-profit organizations

A charity regulator is a regulatory agency that regulates the charitable or wider nonprofit sectors in it respective jurisdiction. They can also be referred to as commissions, although that term can also refer specifically to the non-tax policy regulation of charitable organizations.

Charity regulators take various forms, from small teams within taxation departments to standalone bodies.

== Examples ==
- Charity Commission for England and Wales
- Charity Commission for Northern Ireland
- Office of the Scottish Charity Regulator
- Charities Regulator or An Rialálaí Carthanas (Ireland)
- Gibraltar Charity Commissioners
- Federal Republic of Germany Transparency Register
- Public benefit organizations and NGOs at the Department of Social and Solidarity Economy (Poland)
- The Foundation Authority (Norway)
- Associations and foundations at the Finnish Patent and Registration Office
- Registrars of Associations, Charitable Trusts, Endowments, Pledges, Companies (including public benefit companies), and more at the Corporations Authority (Israel)
- Punjab Charity Commission (Pakistan)
- Chinese Ministry of Civil Affairs online database of social organizations
- Inland Revenue Department (Hong Kong)
- Commissioner of Charities (Singapore)
- Charities Services (Ngā Ratonga Kaupapa Atawhai) (New Zealand)
- Australian Charities and Not-For-Profits Commission
- Charities Directorate of Canada (La Direction des Organismes de Bienfaisance)
- Charities and Nonprofits at the United States Internal Revenue Service
- New York State Attorney General's Charities Bureau
- California Attorney General's Registry of Charitable Trusts

== See also ==
- Charitable trust
- Charity assessment
