= Small Charity Governance =

Small Charity Governance is concerned with the control and direction of charitable organisations established for the public benefit in the United Kingdom. The majority of charities in England and Wales (totaling about 190,000) have an income under £10,000, and only about 22% of charities have any staff at all. Many community groups and small voluntary organisations are not registered charities, because either their turnover is below the threshold for registration or their purpose does not fall within the definition of charitable activity. Much literature about governance is written from the perspective of the minority of larger charities; this article attempts to address the topic by focusing on the experience and concerns of the majority. Governance is the process through which a group of people make decisions which direct their collective efforts. This typically features delegation to a smaller group, which is in turn accountable to the stakeholders or owners of the organisation.

== Role ==
In small voluntary organisations, those entrusted with the governance function (the governing body or board of trustees) are expected to carry out both governance functions and to also perform other roles within the organisation. Core functions are:

- To ensure that the charity remains true to its mission and values
- To determine its strategy
- To act as the point of final accountability for its actions and those of its representatives and staff
- To safeguard its assets

When the organisation employs staff, the governing body undertakes the management role of hiring, firing and holding the head of staff accountable. Another role is as liaison between the organisation and the outside world: providing a conduit for information and ideas, representing it and acting as an ambassador for it.

In addition to these governance functions, trustees of small charities may also be expected to:

- Act as a pool of expertise and advice, making this available to staff and volunteers
- Manage one (or more) staff, volunteers or projects (for instance, managing the work of the coordinator or production of the newsletter)
- Carrying out the work of the organisation: staffing a helpline, answering correspondence and so on

The literature typically restricts its coverage to “pure” governance functions; it does not pay attention to these other functions which are carried out by the trustees of small charities, seen by staff, volunteers and committee members as the contribution made by them to the organisation.

== Governors ==
There is sometimes a lack of clarity concerning who the governing group is, what they are called and how many of them there are. The Charity Commission's preferred term is "trustee, but a more-common term is "management committee member". Other terms include:

- Executive Committee member
- Board member
- Director
- Governor
- Council Member

The Charity Commission has details of about 890,000 charity trustees. Since community groups and small voluntary organisations do not have to register, the precise number of those involved in governing them is unknown but is estimated to be about one million. This gives a grand total of almost two million people in governance positions in community groups, voluntary organisations and charities in England and Wales.

== Concerns ==
At the turn of the 21st century, a number of overlapping areas of concern arose and reshaped the environment for governance. These included:

- International debate about the role of civil society
- Concern about scandals in the private, public and voluntary sectors concerning those in governing positions
- Gap in understanding between funders and regulators on the one hand and small charities and voluntary organisations on the other

Competing governance requirements have arisen, and each stakeholder in small organisations has concerns about governance:

- Regulators are concerned with declining public confidence in charities.
- Funders are concerned with reputation and financial risk.
- Trustees/management committee members feel that the duties expected of them are unclear.
- Members find themselves competing with funders, as accountability to funders usurps their role in controlling the organisation.

== Conflicts ==
Small voluntary organisations find themselves faced with four competing governance requirements:

- Whilst countering social exclusion and strengthening civil society, they must be accountable to members and have a strong voice.
- Whilst delivering services to users, they must be accountable to funders/purchasers.
- Whilst promoting social entrepreneurship, they must balance accountability to a wide group of stakeholders with individual action.
- Whilst engaging in consultation and lobbying, they must demonstrate responsiveness and accountability to the community.

== Definitions ==
Governance is defined in a variety of ways:

- Structurally (for example, having a constitution)
- Processes (for example, having sub-committees in positions of responsibility)
- Roles and functions
- Group dynamics (teamwork)
- Individual competence (for example, chairing skills)

A more comprehensive way of looking at governance is to view it as the sum of these perspectives. One way of connecting all of these aspects of governance is to visualize a governance system (see below). The individual competencies and resulting group dynamics between the individuals can be seen as the inputs into the system. Those skills and group processes are then applied through the structures and processes that are in place, resulting in governance (the outputs).

For example, a governance "output" (or function) is to be accountable for the organisation. This is achieved by the individual trustees using their skills in evaluation and analysis, applying them in the group setting through the committee using committee structures (such as a meeting) and processes (an agenda).

== Assessment ==
Once governance has been defined, it should be possible to assess it. However, because of the complexity involved it is tempting to choose one or two aspects of governance and assess them by taking a small number of features as a proxy for good governance. For practical reasons, it is common to look at just two aspects of governance (individual skills and structures); these are tangible, visible features of an organisation’s governance. Thus, it is possible to assess whether the trustees possess a particular range of skills and certain structures (such as a constitution) are in place.

== Balance ==
Governance can be considered as keeping a balance between competing and conflicting demands:

- "Watchdog" or "cheerleader"
- More involvement or less
- Management versus planning
- Short or long term
- "Big picture" versus details

The balance depends on circumstances: the organisation's life cycle, its current health and demands on the committee. It is a judgement for the committee to make.

== Organizational life cycle ==
There are two views of an organisation's life cycle. The first, linear view is that (like organic life) organisations progress through stages from birth, infancy, adolescence, maturity, senescence and death. The second view is that within this continuum organisations can start at different points and skip (or repeat) stages in cycles. For instance, with appropriate support and backing an organisation can begin its life in a fully formed, "mature" state. Mature organisations may collapse and begin anew in infancy or adolescence before developing into a mature organisation, sometimes repeating this process. The governing body's role changes, according to the stage of the organisation’s life cycle. The transition from one stage to another may be particularly challenging for governance.

== See also ==
- Charitable Incorporated Organisation
