= Charities Regulator =

Regulator of charities in Ireland

- An Rialálaí Carthanas

Charity regulator overview
- Formed: 16 October 2014
- Jurisdiction: Ireland
- Headquarters: 3 George's Dock, Dublin 1; 53.3497°N 6.2479°W
- Employees: 38 (as of 2019)
- Annual budget: €3.7m (as of 2019)
- Website: Official website

The Charities Regulator (Irish: An Rialálaí Carthanas) is the operational name of the Charities Regulatory Authority, the statutory authority responsible for the regulation of charities in Ireland. The organisation is made up of a board, with four sub-committees, and as of 2019, a staff of 38, including a chief executive.

The Charities Act 2009 provided for the establishment of the regulator and the dissolution of a predecessor body, among other matters, but the authority was not actually established until October 2014. The 2009 act was a major reform of the legal framework for the registration and regulation of charities in Ireland, superseding a range of earlier acts back to the 17th century, and various common and case law provisions. The act made major changes to the registration of charities; it also empowered the regulator to investigate the affairs of any charitable organisation, although some of these powers were only commenced later. Several high-profile investigations have followed.

== History ==
=== Previous regulatory regime ===
Two statutory bodies were previously the principal overseers of charitable activity in Ireland, but with limited roles. One, the Commissioners of Charitable Donations and Bequests (Ireland) or Commissioners of Charitable Donations and Bequests for Ireland, was established in the 19th century, with thirteen commissioners, two senior officials and eleven appointed figures, and had a role in advising charitable trustees, appointment of new trustees, alienation and investment of certain assets, and dealing with aspects of bequests to charities. The other, the Revenue Commissioners, the Irish government agency principally responsible for taxation, was given responsibility for granting charitable tax exemptions (in the form of "CHY numbers") to organisations fulfilling certain "public benefit" criteria. Approximately 8,000 organisations with CHY numbers were registered with the Revenue Commissioners by the time of the formation of the Charities Regulator.

=== New regime ===
The Charities Act 2009 (formerly the Charities Bill 2007) provided for the creation of the Charities Regulatory Authority, known for operational purposes as the Charities Regulator, and an appeals tribunal, the transfer of powers from the Commissioners of Donations and Bequests and the dissolution of that body, the establishment of a public register of charities, and other matters. However, it was not commenced for some years, for what the relevant minister, Alan Shatter, described as "financial reasons".

There were "high-profile scandals" in several charities in 2013 and early 2014. These controversies included the alleged use of donations and state funding (intended to provide services at charities like the Rehab Group and Central Remedial Clinic) to pay high salaries, lease cars and contribute to the pension funds of charity management. On foot of these, the regulator commenced operations on a "shadow basis" in early 2014, with a board appointed on a non-statutory basis. The first chairperson was the chair of the Charity Committee of Chartered Accountants Ireland, Conor Woods, and the first chief executive was Úna Ní Dhubhghaill. The board included at least two charity sector figures, Fergus Finlay of Barnardos and Ann Fitzgerald of Cork's Simon Community.

The authority was established on 16 October 2014, when the Minister for Justice and Equality issued a ministerial commencement order. The regulator was initially empowered to undertake reactive investigations (in the event of a complaint or whistleblowing allegation) and, from 2016, "in the wake of the Console charity scandal" these enforcement powers were expanded to include proactive investigations.

== Scope ==
The regulator oversees registered charities, and can pursue bodies falsely claiming to be charities. Ireland's non-governmental organisation sector comprises over 32,000 bodies, but only 10,470 of these were registered charities at the end of 2019. The basic requirement for charitable status and registration with the regulator is public benefit, which excludes bodies primarily established for the benefit of those who become members, such as most sports clubs, credit unions, and trade unions and professional associations. Three specific charitable purposes are defined – relief of poverty, education and the advancement of religion, and the Charities Act (2009) details a dozen further examples under an "other community benefit" heading. These include community welfare and development, integration of the disadvantaged, promotion of health and conflict resolution, protection of the environment and animals, and advancement of the arts and culture, heritage or science. The advancement of human rights was effectively excluded, though in 2015 an Oireachtas committee recommended that this be added as a charitable cause. Political parties are also excluded. Almost all schools are required to register with the regulator.

The regulator deals with entities registered as companies (generally of the company limited by guarantee form), with charitable trusts, and with unincorporated bodies, including most schools, parishes and local youth groups. For those registered as companies, the regulator exchanges data with the Companies Registration Office, and can refer concerns to the Director of Corporate Enforcement.

== Functions ==
The Charities Regulator was established to "increase public trust" in the charitable sector and is responsible for maintaining the Register of Charities. All organisations authorised as tax-exempt charities by the Revenue Commissioners at the time of the regulator's establishment were deemed authorised for the purposes of the new regulatory regime, and more than 2,500 further charities have registered since commencement. It is an offence for an organisation to describe itself as a charity if it is not registered with the regulator. Elements of the register are available to the public through the regulator's website.

The regulator is also responsible for "ensuring accountability", and as part of this, for receiving and reviewing the annual financial returns of charities, pursuing complaints made against charities (of which there were 531 in 2017), appointing investigators into the operation of charities, and taking specific actions (including the replacement of trustees or involvement of law enforcement) depending on the outcome of investigations. Bodies to which the regulator can refer findings include the Garda Síochána, the Revenue Commissioners, the Director of Corporate Enforcement and the Competition Authority.

Aside from registration, the regulator works to educate trustees and the public, to support charity development, and to share information on the charity sector. It provides guidelines and model constitutional documents, but does not have authority to control one of the main sources of controversy in the charity scandals of 2013–2014, terms and conditions of charity staff, including salaries.

== Structure and funding ==
The functions of the Charities Regulator are overseen by its 12-person board, and conducted (as of 2019) by a staff of 38, including a chief executive, a director of regulation and five business unit heads.

The regulator is funded by the Oireachtas through the exchequer. It is also authorised to levy fees on charities (and in 2018 a 100 euro registration fee was proposed). The regulator is entitled to recover the costs of investigative or enforcement actions from the person or persons involved, in the event of a conviction.

== Charity Appeals Tribunal ==
An appellate body was provided for in the Charities Act 2009, and established in 2016. It sat for the first time in 2019, dismissing a case.

== See also ==
- Charity Commission for Northern Ireland
- Charity Commission for England and Wales
- Scottish Charity Regulator
