= Independent Monitoring Authority for the Citizens' Rights Agreements =

- Welsh: Awdurdod Monitro Annibynnol ar gyfer y Cytundebau Hawliau Dinasyddion
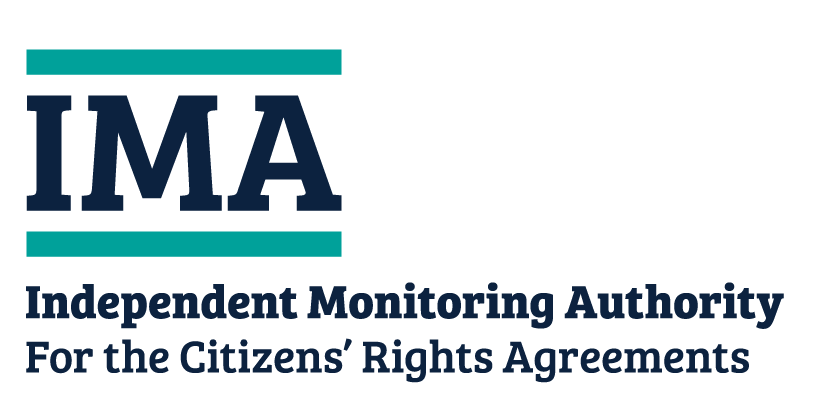

Non-departmental public body overview
- Formed: 2020
- Jurisdiction: United Kingdom; Gibraltar
- Headquarters: Swansea, Wales
- Employees: 60-70
- Minister responsible: Shabana Mahmood, Secretary of State for Justice and Lord Chancellor
- Non-departmental public body executives: Nicole Lappin, Chair; Miranda Biddle, Chief Executive
- Website: Official website

The Independent Monitoring Authority for the Citizens' Rights Agreements (IMA; Welsh: Awdurdod Monitro Annibynnol ar gyfer y Cytundebau Hawliau Dinasyddion) is a body corporate set up in the United Kingdom by the European Union (Withdrawal Agreement) Act 2020 to monitor the functioning of the provisions of the Brexit withdrawal agreement relating to citizens' rights, and to protect the rights of European Union citizens in the UK.

Based at the Swansea Civic Centre in Swansea, Wales, it is an executive non-departmental public body, sponsored by the Ministry of Justice.

== Role of the IMA ==
The IMA was established to make sure the agreement is being properly upheld. In specific terms, the Independent Monitoring Authority for the Citizens’ Rights Agreements (IMA) protects the rights of EU and EEA EFTA citizens, and their family members, in the UK and Gibraltar. Essentially, the IMA helps people from EU and EEA EFTA countries get the same rights as they did before the UK left the EU. The IMA are responsible for making sure that UK public bodies and public bodies in Gibraltar are respecting the rights of EU and EEA EFTA citizens and their family members. Public bodies can include:

- government departments (such as the Home Office or HM Revenue and Customs)
- devolved governments in Scotland, Wales and Northern Ireland
- government agencies (such as the Driver and Vehicle Licensing Agency)
- local councils
- non-departmental public bodies (such as NHS England or the Health and Safety Executive)
- public corporations (such as the BBC or the Pension Protection Fund)

== Enforcement and investigations ==
In October 2022, IMA took the Home Office to court, arguing that it is against the withdrawal agreement for the government to require EU citizens to apply for settled status upon the expiry of their pre-settled status.

== Structure ==
The Independent Monitoring Authority costs of a non-executive board of six directors representing each governed area represented in the Withdrawal Agreement.

Portrait	Name	Post held	Appointed Until
	Nicole Lappin	Chair	31 December 2028
	Leo O'Reilly	Non-executive Director	December 2026
	Punam Birly	Non-executive Director	7 December 2025
	Ronnie Alexander	Non-executive Director	16 March 2024
	Marcus Killick	Non-executive Director	December 2026
	Joyce Cullen	Non-executive Director	9 February 2024

All non-executive directors are appointed by the Lord Chancellor and Secretary of State for Justice.

Day-to-day management is delegated to the Chief Executive of the IMA who has overall responsibility for the three directorates.

Portrait	Name	Post held	Post Held Since	Tenure
	Miranda Biddle	Chief Executive Officer	July 2023	3 years, 101 days
	Andrew Bagley	Director of Governance and Corporate Services	September 2020	6 years, 69 days
	Rhys Davies	General Counsel	November 2020	6 years, 21 days
	Pam Everett	Director of Operational Delivery	November 2020	6 years, 39 days

=== Former executive and non-executive directors ===
Portrait	Name	Post held	Start	End	Tenure
	Dr Kathryn Chamberlain	Chief Executive Officer	2020	2023	3 years, 180 days
	Sir Ashley Fox	Chairman	2020	2023	2 years, 281 days
