= Humanitarian crowdfunding =

Humanitarian crowdfunding is an emerging, donation-based crowdfunding vertical recognized by the humanitarian community. It is classified as child category, nested under the generic term "charitable giving".

== Defining characteristics ==
Humanitarian stakeholders are working together to define humanitarian crowdfunding and establish reporting guidelines for humanitarian crowdfunding campaigns, bringing professional standards, proper aid activity reporting, transparency and accountability down to the crowdfunding level.

Presently, humanitarian crowdfunding campaigns are expected to be initiated by aid agencies and raise support for activities falling within the scope of humanitarian and development activities classified by OECD DAC-CRS purpose codes and supplementary activity codes established by AidData. Campaigns and activities are also expected to adhere to common principles and universal minimum standards for humanitarian response outlined by the Sphere Project.

== Challenges ==
In practice, crowdfunding platforms like Crowdrise, Fundly, Generosity, GoFundMe, GlobalGiving, Indiegogo, Mightycause, Kickstarter, Whydonate, StartSomeGood and YouCaring treat humanitarian activities differently. They use inconsistent terms to refer to humanitarian activities and aggregate humanitarian and non-humanitarian activities together, based on how Humanitarian Aid is defined. YouCaring for example loosely lists 21 subcategories under the term "humanitarian causes", including categories like Pets, Tuition, Neighbors and Sports. GIVEasia claims to be "Asia's Leading Humanitarian Crowdfunding Platform" while hosting a similar broad range of appeals.

Different terms used to classify humanitarian crowdfunding campaigns:
Crowdfunder	Category
Crowdrise	Disaster Relief, Refugee Relief
Fundly	Nonprofits and Charity
Generosity	Emergencies
Global Giving	Humanitarian Aid, (multiple categories)
GoFundme	Emergencies
Indiegogo	Community, Health
Rally	Emergencies and Relief
Razoo	Humanitarian Aid, Emergencies
StartSomeGood	Disaster Response
YouCaring	Emergencies
www.PrajaArogya.org	Public Healthcare

== Future ==
Humanitarian crowdfunding is seen as an evolving vertical, adapting to humanitarian needs and input provided by humanitarian organizations. The United Nations Office for the Coordination of Humanitarian Affairs and Beehive, a nonprofit, open source initiative improving humanitarian crowdfunding, see humanitarian crowdfunding heading toward a distributed-goal framework allowing data sourced from the humanitarian community to inform giving in real-time supporting humanitarian and development aid activities.

=== Innovation ===
Linking IATI (International Aid Transparency Initiative) and crowdfunding is seen as a way of innovating humanitarian crowdfunding and making data on aid activities, transactions and results visible across different crowdfunding platforms.

== Classification systems and crowdfunding ==
NTEE is a classification system used principally to classify non-humanitarian activities whereas DAC-CRS is a classification system maintained by the OECD DAC Secretariat used to classify humanitarian and development activities. OECD DAC-CRS codes are incorporated into International Aid Transparency Initiative's (IATI) open data sharing standard and framework for aid activity reporting, used by hundreds of humanitarian and development organizations, to classify aid activities by sector. Beehive is the first and only humanitarian crowdfunding initiative enabling humanitarian and development organizations to launch crowdfunding campaigns with their IATI activity files, linking aid activity reporting, DAC-CRS codes and crowd-fundraising.

== See also ==
- Crowdfunding
