= Charity Commission for Northern Ireland =

Independent regulator of Northern Ireland charities

Non-departmental public body overview
- Formed: 2009
- Jurisdiction: Northern Ireland
- Annual budget: £1.9 million (2024–25)
- Non-departmental public body executives: Gerard McCurdy, Chief Commissioner; Frances McCandless, Chief Executive
- Website: www.charitycommissionni.org.uk

The Charity Commission for Northern Ireland (CCNI) is the independent regulator of Northern Ireland charities. It was established in 2009 under the Charities Act (Northern Ireland) 2008.

== Aims ==
The stated vision of the commission is for "a dynamic and well governed charities sector in which the public has confidence. This is underpinned by effective delivery of its regulatory role".

== Register of charities ==
The commission received the names and details of over 7,000 organisations in Northern Ireland that had previously been granted charitable status for tax purposes (the "deemed list") from HM Revenue & Customs. Compulsory registration of organisations from the deemed list began in December 2013, and it is expected to take three to four years to complete.

The register is publicly available on the CCNI website, and contains the details of those organisations who have so far been confirmed by the Commission to exist for charitable purposes and the public benefit. Members of the public can search the register using a charity's NIC (Northern Ireland charity) number or use the advanced search option to search for charities by name, objects, activities or area of operation.

The commission estimates that there are between 7,000 and 11,500 charitable organisations to be formally registered in total.

== Status ==
The Commission is a non-departmental public body, supported by the Department for Communities. Its main role is to register and regulate the estimated 7,000–10,000 charities working within Northern Ireland. The Charities Act (Northern Ireland) 2008 created the Charity Commission and the same Act sets out its powers.

The regulation and registration of charities in Northern Ireland will bring the region into line with other parts of the United Kingdom. The Office of the Scottish Charity Regulator and the Charity Commission for England and Wales operate similarly in their respective jurisdictions.

The registration process for charities was suspended in 2010, as the 2008 Act needed to be amended to clarify the "public benefit" test. This was resolved in January 2013, following which a consultation was announced prior to commencing registration on 16 December 2013.

In the meantime, the Commission was already able to exercise its power to investigate the affairs of charities when abuse or harm is suspected.

== Investigations ==
The Charity Commission has looked into numerous charities since the commencement of investigatory powers in February 2011. The investigations have concerned a wide spectrum of charities; many of these investigations have been closed with recommendations being made on simple good governance issues, while other cases are more serious and investigations remain live.

== Chief executive and board ==
The first chief executive of the commission is Frances McCandless who was appointed to the post in April 2010. McCandless had experience in the voluntary and community sector, particularly as director of policy with the Northern Ireland Council for Voluntary Action.

Tom McGrath was Chief Charity Commissioner from 2014 to 2019. McGrath previously worked as regional director for Marsh Limited for 34 years. He was also previously chair of the NI Tourist Board, the NI Business Education Trust and the George Best Memorial Trust.

Nicole Lappin was appointed Chief Charity Commissioner in 2019. She vacated the post in 2022 when appointed Chair of the Northern Ireland Housing Executive. Nicole, a Barrister, practised in both Dublin and Belfast in the late 1990's and early 2000's. She has also held several governance positions including Chair of the Northern Ireland Ambulance Service and Chair of the Independent Monitoring Authority for the Citizens' Rights Agreements.

Gerard McCurdy was appointed as the Chief Commissioner in 2022 and is due to be in post until 2028.
